= Marvin Trilogy =

Musicals by William Finn, 1978, 1981, 1990

- Music: William Finn
- Lyrics: William Finn
- Book: In Trousers; William Finn; March of the Falsettos and Falsettoland; William Finn; James Lapine
- Premiere: February 21, 1978: Playwrights Horizons
- Productions: In Trousers; 1979 Off-Broadway; 1981 Off-Broadway revival; 1985 Off-Broadway revival; March of the Falsettos; 1981 Off-Broadway; 1987 West End; Falsettoland; 1990 Off-Broadway
- Awards: March of the Falsettos; Outer Critics Circle Award for Best Off-Broadway Play; Falsettoland; Drama Desk Award for Outstanding Lyrics; Outer Critics Circle Award for Best Off-Broadway Musical; Lucille Lortel Award for Outstanding Musical

The Marvin Trilogy is a trilogy of one-act musicals created by William Finn. It consists of In Trousers (1978), March of the Falsettos (1981), and Falsettoland (1990). The musicals center on Marvin, who has left his wife to be with a male lover, Whizzer, and struggles to keep his family together. The first act of the trilogy (In Trousers) focuses on Marvin's life as an adolescent, the influential women of his life, and his struggle to accept his sexual identity. Much of the second act (March of the Falsettos) explores the impact his relationship with Whizzer has had on his family. The third act (Falsettoland) focuses on how family dynamics evolve as Marvin and Trina plan for their son's Bar Mitzvah. Central to the musical are the themes of Jewish identity, gender roles, and gay life in the late 1970s and early 1980s.

March of the Falsettos and Falsettoland were later combined into one musical titled Falsettos with music and lyrics by Finn and a book by Lapine. When referring to Falsettos, March of the Falsettos is thought of as the first act, as opposed to In Trousers, which is act one in the Marvin Trilogy. The 2016 Broadway revival of Falsettos is the most widely well-known rendition of any play in the Marvin Trilogy. As for the first musical in the Marvin Trilogy, In Trousers is the most obscure musical of the three.

== Musicals ==
Composer William Finn began his theater career with the one-act musical In Trousers (1978). It was produced twice at Playwrights Horizons off-Broadway, opening in February 1978 and again in December 1979. It was also produced off-Broadway at Second Stage Theater in March 1981. Finn struggled in his science classes and discarded his medical school plans, turning back to writing about the character of Marvin. Finn soon wrote the songs for another one-act musical, March of the Falsettos (1981), collaborating with director James Lapine on the book. This show premiered at Playwrights Horizons in April 1981 and ran through September before moving to the Westside Theatre in October 1981. Almost a decade after March of the Falsettos, in the wake of the ravages of the 1980s AIDS epidemic, Finn followed with Falsettoland. The musical concluded Finn's "Marvin Trilogy" of one-act pieces about Marvin and his circle, beginning with In Trousers and March of the Falsettos. Falsettoland opened at Playwrights Horizons on June 28, 1990, then moved to the Lucille Lortel Theatre on September 16, 1990, where it closed on January 27, 1991. Finn and Lapine then combined March of the Falsettos and Falsettoland to form a full-length show, titled Falsettos, slightly altering them to form a "more unified, more thematically consistent" musical.

Musical	Music	Lyrics	Book	Premiere date	Premiere Location	Closing Date
In Trousers	William Finn		William Finn	February 21, 1979	Playwrights Horizon	March 18, 1979
March of the Falsettos	William Finn		William Finn and James Lapine	May 20, 1981	Playwrights Horizon	September 26, 1981
Falsettoland	William Finn		William Finn and James Lapine	June 28, 1990	Playwrights Horizon	August 12, 1990
Falsettos	William Finn		William Finn and James Lapine	April 29, 1992	John Golden Theatre	June 27, 1993

=== In Trousers ===
The one-act musical centers on Marvin, who has a wife and child. He recalls the past relationships he shared with, among others, his high school sweetheart and Miss Goldberg, his English teacher who let him play Christopher Columbus in the school play, and then reveals he prefers to be with men. Torn between his natural inclination and his desire not to upset his family life as he knows it, Marvin ultimately makes the decision he feels is best for him.

=== March Of The Falsettos ===
In 1979 New York City, Marvin tells the audience that he has left his family, his wife Trina and son Jason, for a male lover named Whizzer. Marvin recommends that Trina get help with his psychiatrist, Mendel. The two end up getting engaged, much to Marvin's dismay. Meanwhile, he and Whizzer have several relationship problems and have an on-again, off-again bond. When Whizzer wins a game of chess, Marvin promptly breaks up with him for the final time. At the same time, Jason battles his questions about his parents' divorce and individual relationships. As a result, Trina sends him to therapy with Mendel which seems to help the child. In the final scene of the show, Marvin gets an invitation to Trina and Mendel's wedding, which makes him mad enough to hit Trina. He apologizes to Jason for his behavior and promises to stay calm.

=== Falsettoland ===
Two years later, Trina and Mendel are married, Marvin and Whizzer are still separated, and Jason is about to turn thirteen. Also in the group of friends are two lesbians who live next door to Marvin, medical doctor Charlotte and aspiring chef Cordelia. Trina and Marvin are forced to spend time together as they have to plan for Jason's bar mitzvah, which he is not too excited about. Marvin and Whizzer rekindle their relationship. Through the show, Dr Charlotte grows concerned about an unknown virus that it is later heavily implied, and clear through context to be HIV/AIDS. Whizzer soon after becomes sick with the illness. Jason decides to hold his bar mitzvah at the hospital with all his friends. Unfortunately, after the party, Whizzer dies and the final scene shows his funeral. At the end of the show, Mendel sings "Welcome to Falsettoland", revealing the darker sides of the characters' lives.

== Original casts and characters ==
Character	In Trousers	March of the Falsettos	Falsettoland	Falsettos	Falsettos (2016 Revival)
Marvin	Chip Zien	Michael Rupert	Michael Rupert	Michael Rupert	Christian Borle
Whizzer		Stephen Bogardus	Stephen Bogardus	Stephen Bogardus	Andrew Rannells
Trina	Alison Fraser	Alison Fraser	Faith Prince	Barbara Walsh	Stephanie J. Block
Mendel		Chip Zien	Chip Zien	Chip Zien	Brandon Uranowitz
Jason		James Kushner	James Kushner	Jonathan Kaplan	Anthony Rosenthal
Charlotte			Heather MacRae	Heather MacRae	Tracie Thoms
Cordelia			Janet Metz	Carolee Carmello	Betsy Wolfe
Marvin's Sweetheart	Joanna Green				
Miss Goldberg	Mary Testa				

=== Characters ===
- Marvin, Whizzer's lover, Trina's former husband, and Jason's father.
- Whizzer, Marvin's lover and a close friend of Jason.
- Trina, Marvin's ex-wife, Jason's mother, and Mendel's wife.
- Mendel, Trina's husband, Jason's step-father, and therapist to Marvin, Trina and Jason.
- Jason, Marvin and Trina's son and Mendel's step-son.
- Charlotte, A doctor and Cordelia's girlfriend.
- Cordelia, An aspiring chef and Charlotte's girlfriend.

==== Characters only in "In Trousers" ====
- Marvin's Sweetheart, Marvin's high school girlfriend. Who is a person too.
- Miss Goldberg, Marvin's high school English teacher and director of the school's play.

== Themes ==
=== Judaism ===
Finn's Jewish upbringing inspired themes in Falsettos.

Jewish culture and identity play a significant role in Falsettos. It takes place in the "often humorous environment of Jewish neuroses and self-deprecation." Finn gave Judaism a central role in the musical, emphasized by beginning the show with the song "Four Jews in a Room Bitching". The stage version begins with all four male characters dressed in clothing from Biblical times before they remove these robes to reveal modern clothing. In the song, three characters state that they are Jewish, while Whizzer specifies that he is "half-Jewish". The first act, "March of the Falsettos", was originally intended to be titled Four Jews in a Room Bitching until Lapine insisted that Finn change the title. Writers Raymond and Zelda Knapp compared the implications of the AIDS epidemic in Falsettos to the foreshadowing of the Holocaust in the 1964 Jewish musical Fiddler on the Roof, noting that both works suggest the "comparatively innocent" atmosphere before tragedy and the "grim" environment afterward.

Jason's bar mitzvah is a major plot point and accentuates the theme of the male characters maturing and becoming men. Jesse Oxfeld of The Forward wrote that the musical is a "story about love and family – about making your own chosen family, which is of course a classic gay trope, but also, in its message of accommodation and dedication and, well, l'dor v'dor, very Jewish." He also noted that due to the musical's casual, matter-of-fact depiction of homosexuality, "The lesbians are most interesting for being goyim". The song "The Baseball Game" pokes fun at a stereotypical lack of athletic prowess among American Jews, but Mendel then points out the success of Jewish baseball players Sandy Koufax and Hank Greenberg. Finn, who played Little League baseball as a child, invited Koufax to a performance of Falsettos in Los Angeles, and the baseball player was "offended – not at all pleased" by the joke.

=== AIDS epidemic ===
While Falsettos never explicitly mentions the words HIV or AIDS, the disease plays a major role in the second half of the musical. Examples of implicit references to the virus include "Something that kills/Something infectious/Something that spreads from one man to another" and "something so bad that words have lost their meaning". The first half of the musical takes place in 1979, before the start of the epidemic, and the second half takes place in 1981, the year the epidemic began. This historical development results in the first act being primarily a comedy, but the second being mostly a tragedy, so that an audience member is likely to "enter laughing and exit crying". In 1981, the disease was not understood by the medical community and was eventually called GRID (Gay-related immune deficiency) by The New York Times in May 1982. Lapine has described the AIDS epidemic as "a time frame in our past that has somewhat been forgotten ... we had lost a lot of people to HIV. ... We really need to keep that history alive.'" Of his musical Falsettos, Finn has stated, "It's been so hard to get this produced, only because it's been called an 'AIDS play' so often."

Finn wanted to convey the tragedy of AIDS accurately in Falsettoland and thought, "I can't have AIDS be peripheral in the show, and I don't know that I could write about AIDS head-on because the horror is too real and I don’t want to trivialize it." Finn later described Falsettos as a "catharsis for people who've been going through the AIDS epidemic as well as for people not going through it", hoping that the show would allow people who had only read about the epidemic to empathize with people who had lived through it first-hand. The inclusion of lesbian characters Charlotte and Cordelia is a tribute to the lesbians who assisted gay men during the epidemic. Finn expressed that the inclusion of women in the story was paramount to the message of the show, explaining, "Gay men's lives have a lot of women in them. This is important to come into the conversation. They should not be ignored." The show also explores heterosexual Trina's perspective on Whizzer's illness in "Holding to the Ground", where she shows solidarity with him despite previously struggling to accept his relationship with Marvin.

The revival of the show in 2016 was partly intended to educate young LGBT youth about gay life in the 1980s and to instill a sense of gratitude at how both societal views of gay people and HIV/AIDS treatments have vastly improved since that period. Lapine was inspired to revisit the show when attending a performance of The Normal Heart with a recent college graduate. He recalled: "At intermission, she just looked at me and she said, 'Well, I kind of know about AIDS, but was it really like this?'" AIDS activist and playwright of The Normal Heart, Larry Kramer, attended a performance of the 2016 Falsettos revival. Andrew Rannells, who portrayed Whizzer, noted that seeing Kramer in the audience while singing "You Gotta Die Sometime" left him "completely wrecked" due to his admiration for Kramer's activism in support of the LGBT community and HIV-positive people.

=== Masculinity ===
Charles Isherwood of The New York Times asserts that definitions of masculinity form "a sharp undercurrent in the show". In the first act, Marvin attempts to force Whizzer into the role of "pretty boy homemaker", which causes Whizzer to step away from the relationship. Though Marvin is now in a same-sex relationship, he still tries to assume the more traditionally masculine role of the provider. Daily Herald writer Jennifer Farrar characterized the arguments between Marvin and Whizzer as "testosterone-laden". The song "March of the Falsettos" is an ode to the immaturity of the male characters, and features the three adult male characters singing in falsetto to match Jason's pre-pubescent voice. In "Trina's Song", Trina complains that "I'm tired of all the happy men who rule the world", and "her fondness for the man-babies in her life battling with exasperation and needy resentment at every turn."

Trina's struggles with the men in her life are also symbolized in "I'm Breaking Down", where she manically chops bananas and carrots for her "banana-carrot surprise", "an unusual combination but an appropriately phallic one". By including Jason's bar mitzvah as a key component of the second act, Finn represents the evolution of the male characters in the show. Finn explains, "There’s so much about what it means to be a man in the show. It’s not only the kid becoming a man – it’s kind of all the men becoming men. It’s a metaphor that resonates." Critics interpreted the set design of the 2016 revival to reflect immaturity by representing the New York City skyline in the form of children's building blocks. The musical additionally explores the link between masculinity and sexuality. Marvin's preteen son Jason questions his sexuality and worries that his father's homosexuality could be genetically passed down to him "My Father's a Homo".

== Critical reception ==
=== In Trousers ===
After In Trousers received sharply unfavorable reviews, Finn considered abandoning musical theater and attending medical school. He felt that "if the critic for the Times at that time had been more responsible, it would have been a considerable debut. But as it was, he just said it was junk."

=== March of the Falsettos ===
March of the Falsettos received more positive critical reception than In Trousers: Ellen Pall of The New York Times noted that Finn's "brilliant form combined with the absolute topicality of his social themes first bowled critics over".

== Awards ==
=== March of the Falsettos ===
Year	Award Ceremony	Award	Nominee	Result
1981	Outer Critics Circle Award	Best Off-Broadway Musical		Won

=== Falsettoland ===
Year	Award Ceremony	Award	Nominee	Result
1991	Lucille Lortel Award	Outstanding Musical		Won
1991	Drama Desk Award	Outstanding Lyrics	William Finn	Won
1991	Outer Critics Circle Award	Best Off-Broadway Musical		Won
