= In Trousers =

Musical

- Original Cast Recording
- Music: William Finn
- Lyrics: William Finn
- Book: William Finn
- Productions: 1978 Off-Broadway; 1979 Off-Broadway; 1981 Off-Broadway revival 1985 Off-Broadway revival

In Trousers is a one-act musical that began off-Broadway in 1978 with book, music and lyrics by William Finn. It is the first in a trilogy of musicals, followed by March of the Falsettos and then Falsettoland.

== Plot ==
The one-act musical In Trousers centers around a character named Marvin. In the production, he recalls his school years and the events that shaped him. He reminisces on his past and past relationships with, among others, his high school sweetheart and his English teacher Miss Goldberg. A pivotal point to the plot, however, is his realization of his homosexuality. Torn between his natural inclinations and his desire not to upset his family life, Marvin begins a struggle with his identity that continues to be a theme in the rest of the trilogy.

== Productions ==
In Trousers began as a collection of songs Finn performed with Mary Testa, Kay Passick, and Alison Fraser in his New York apartment in the late 1970s; the three women would arrive, cook dinner together, and rehearse songs Finn had just written, with Finn himself singing Marvin. This is why the finished piece has one man and three women as its only characters: Marvin, his wife, his high-school sweetheart, and his former teacher Miss Goldberg, with Testa as Miss Goldberg and Passick as the sweetheart. Playwrights Horizons artistic director André Bishop and the theatre's musical theater director, Ira Weitzman, each attended a performance and offered to workshop the piece in the company's new musical theater lab.

Passick left the project when it moved to Playwrights Horizons and was replaced by Joanna Green. The production opened as a workshop on December 8, 1978, in the theatre's 74-seat upstairs space, playing eight performances, with Finn himself still playing Marvin. It was remounted the following year in the company's larger, downstairs Mainstage space, running from February 21 to March 18, 1979; Finn stepped back to direct, and Chip Zien took over as Marvin, joining Fraser, Green, and Testa.

The show received sharply unfavorable reviews, including a dismissive notice from Richard Eder of The New York Times, who found little of substance in it, and Finn, discouraged, considered abandoning musical theatre for medical school before returning to write about Marvin again. Finn also lost his singing voice permanently during a scene in the show. Finn felt that the negative reception to In Trousers was undeserved: "[I]f the critic for the Times at that time had been more responsible, it would have been a considerable debut. But as it was, he just said it was junk. So I just started writing 'March of the Falsettos'."

The play was next produced off-Broadway at the Second Stage Theater in March 1981, with Jay O. Sanders (Marvin), Kate Dezina (His Wife), Alaina Reed (Miss Goldberg) and Karen Jablons (His High School Sweetheart). Direction was by Judith Swift with choreography by Marta Renzi and Sharon Kinney. The play was generally panned.

In 1985, a significantly rewritten version, with additional songs, a more cohesive storyline, and more defined characters (with Marvin's wife now named Trina), opened on March 26 at the off-Broadway Promenade Theatre, where it ran for 16 performances. Directed by Matt Casella, it starred Tony Cummings, Catherine Cox, Sherry Hursey and Kathy Garrick. (Cummings was replaced by Stephen Bogardus shortly after the show opened). In an author's note (dated April 1986) to this version, Finn wrote: "[A] lot of the material was about my learning to write the kind of show songs I want to write. So the show is about Marvin's education, and mine." In his review of this production, Frank Rich wrote: "As lovingly orchestrated by Mr. Finn's long-time collaborator Michael Starobin, the melodies linger well after the final curtain; so do running lyrical conceits built around phrases like breaking down and giddy seizures. Isn't it typical of this luckless season that the musical with the best score would be more enjoyably heard on a cast album than seen on stage?"

Finn eventually collaborated with James Lapine on two additional one-act musicals, March of the Falsettos and Falsettoland, which further explored the lives of Marvin and his family and friends. These two later were combined for a two-act Broadway production entitled Falsettos.

== Casts ==
	Apartment performances (late 1970s)	Playwrights Horizons Workshop (December 1978)	Playwrights Horizons Mainstage (February–March 1979)	Off-Broadway Cast at the Second Stage Theatre (1981)	Off-Broadway Revival Cast at the Promenade Theatre (1985)	Broadway Cares/Equity Fights Aids Staged Concert (1993)
Marvin	William Finn		Chip Zien	Jay O. Sanders	Tony Cummings/Stephen Bogardus	Chip Zien
His Wife/Trina	Alison Fraser			Kate Dezina	Catherine Cox	Alison Fraser
His High School Sweetheart	Kay Passick	Joanna Green		Karen Jablons	Sherry Hursey	Victoria Clark
Miss Goldberg	Mary Testa			Alaina Reed	Kathy Garrick	Mary Testa

== Song list ==
1979

- "Very Opening" – Marvin and Company
- "Marvin's Giddy Seizures" – Marvin and Company
- "How the Body Falls Apart" – His Wife, His Sweetheart, and Miss Goldberg
- "Your Lips and Me" – His Wife
- "My High School Sweetheart" – Company
- "Set Those Sails" – Miss Goldberg and Company
- "My Chance to Survive the Night" – Marvin
- "I Am Wearing a Hat" – Miss Goldberg and Company
- "How Marvin Eats His Breakfast" – Marvin and Company
- "A Breakfast Over Sugar" – Marvin and His Wife
- "Whizzer Going Down" – Marvin and Company
- "High School Ladies at Five O'Clock" – Company
- "The Rape of Miss Goldberg" – Marvin, Miss Goldberg, and His Sweetheart
- "The Nausea Before the Game" – Marvin and Company
- "Love Me for What I Am" – His Wife and Company
- "How America Got Its Name" – Marvin
- "Your Lips and Me (Reprise)" – His Wife
- "Marvin Takes a Victory Shower" – Company
- "Another Sleepless Night" – Company
- "In Trousers (The Dream)" – Marvin and Company

1985

- "In Trousers" – Company
- "I Can't Sleep" – Marvin and Company
- "A Helluva Day" – Trina and Company
- "I Have a Family" – Marvin
- "How Marvin Eats His Breakfast" – Marvin and Company
- "Marvin's Giddy Seizures" – Sweetheart and Company
- "My High School Sweetheart" – Sweetheart and Company
- "Set Those Sails" – Miss Goldberg and Company
- "I Swear I Won't Ever Again (Part 1)" – Marvin
- "High School Ladies at Five O'Clock" – Sweetheart and Company
- "I Swear I Won't Ever Again (Part 2)" – Marvin
- "The Rape of Miss Goldberg" – Marvin, Miss Goldberg, and Sweetheart
- "I Swear I Won't Ever Again (Part 3)" – Marvin and Company
- "Love Me for What I Am" – Trina and Company
- "I Am Wearing a Hat" – Sweetheart and Miss Goldberg
- "Wedding Song" – Company
- "3 Seconds" – Marvin, Sweetheart, and Miss Goldberg
- "Wedding Song (Part 2)" – Marvin, Trina, and Miss Goldberg
- "How the Body Falls Apart" – Trina, Miss Goldberg, and Sweetheart
- "I Feel Him Slipping Away" – Trina, Miss Goldberg, and Sweetheart
- "Whizzer Going Down" – Marvin and Company
- "Marvin's Giddy Seizures (Part 2)" – Company
- "I'm Breaking Down" – Trina
- "Packin' Up" – Marvin
- "Breakfast Over Sugar" – Marvin and Trina
- "How America Got Its Name" – Marvin, Miss Goldberg, and Sweetheart
- "A Helluva Day (Reprise)" – Trina
- "Another Sleepless Night" – Company
- "Good Night (No Hard Feelings)" – Company
- "In Trousers (The Dream)" – Marvin and Company

1993 Plume Edition (published only)

- "Very Opening"
- "Marvin's Giddy Seizures"
- "A Helluva Day"
- "I Have A Family"
- "How Marvin Eats His Breakfast"
- "My High School Sweetheart"
- "Set Those Sails"
- "My Chance to Survive the Night"
- "High-Heeled Ladies at Five O'Clock (A Calypso Fantasy)"
- "The Rape of Miss Goldberg by Marvin (A Fantasy Which Is Better Abstracted)"
- "I Am Wearing a Hat"
- "Wedding Song (Part One)"
- "Three Seconds"
- "Wedding Song (Part Two)"
- "How the Body Falls Apart"
- "I Feel Him Slipping Away"
- "Whizzer Going Down"
- "A Breakfast Over Sugar"
- "The Nausea Before the Game"
- "Love Me for What I Am"
- "How America Got Its Name"
- "Been A Helluva Day (Reprise)"
- "Marvin Takes a Victory Shower"
- "Another Sleepless Night"
- "In Trousers"

== Recording ==
The original cast album was released on CD on the Original Cast record label. In reviewing the original cast recording, William Ruhlmann wrote: "Since Finn turned out to be the most impressive songwriting talent to emerge in the musical theater in the 1980s, this record, a cast recording of the 1979 production, is of more than passing interest, even if, in comparison to its successors, it is slight. Still, the music is lively and melodic, the lyrics often provocative and surprising, and the performances, notably that of Chip Zien, who appeared in the later shows in a different role, arresting." The album made some changes for reasons of time, like cutting the opening number, "Very Opening", and abbreviating several songs, most noticeably "The Rape of Miss Goldberg", "My High School Sweetheart", and "Marvin Takes a Victory Shower". The number "How America Got Its Name" was also cut, except for Marvin's final words. "How America Got Its Name" was later significantly altered, with the original off-Broadway version only being preserved in the original liner notes included with the vinyl release of the original off-Broadway cast recording.
