= James Kushner =

American actor

James Kushner (born 1968) is an American actor. He is most known for playing the role of Jason in the original off-Broadway production of the William Finn/James Lapine one-act musical March of the Falsettos. He also appeared in the HBO production of Lapine's television drama Table Settings.

== Personal life ==
He resides in Florida with his wife and their two daughters.
