= Chip Zien =

American actor

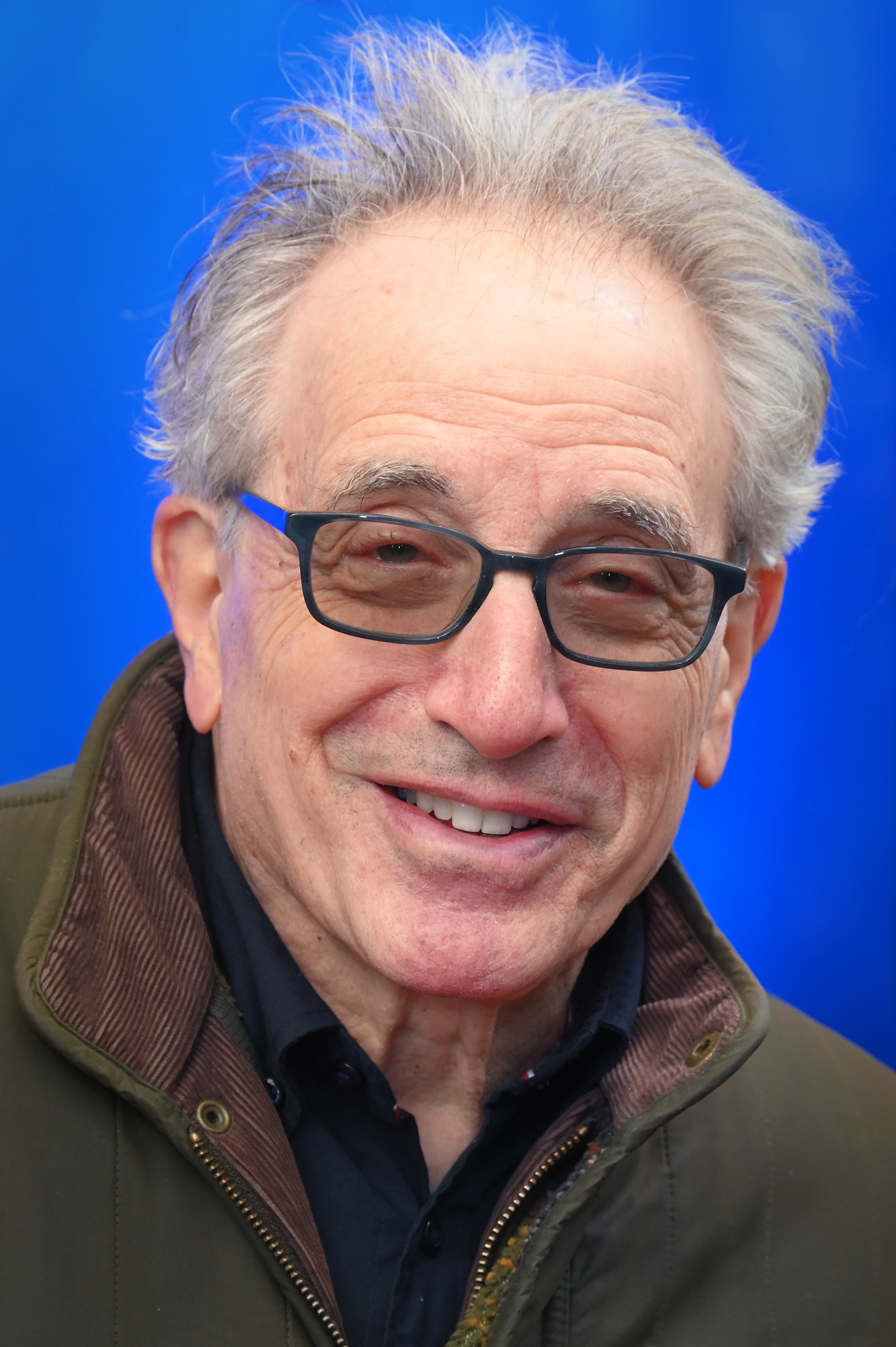
- Zien in 2025
- Born: Jerome Herbert Zien; March 20, 1947 (age 79); Milwaukee, Wisconsin, U.S.
- Education: University of Pennsylvania
- Occupations: Actor, singer
- Years active: 1973–present
- Known for: Into the Woods; Falsettos; Harmony
- Spouse: Susan Pilarre
- Children: 2

Jerome Herbert "Chip" Zien (born March 20, 1947) is an American actor. He is best known for originating the lead role of the Baker in the original Broadway production of the musical Into the Woods by Stephen Sondheim. He appeared in all of the "Marvin Trilogy" musicals by William Finn: as Marvin in In Trousers, and as Dr. Mendel in March of the Falsettos, Falsettoland and Falsettos. In 2023, he returned to Broadway to critical acclaim in the lead role of Rabbi Josef Roman Cycowski in Barry Manilow and Bruce Sussman’s Harmony.

In 1989, he starred as Otto Kringelein in Grand Hotel and in 2007, he played Mssr. Thénardier in Les Misérables, both on Broadway. He also created the role of Mr. Bungee in the original production of A New Brain. On the screen, he portrayed Mark Rothenberg in the film United 93. He is also known for providing the voice of the titular character in the film Howard the Duck. In 2012, he returned to Into the Woods at the Delacorte Theater portraying the Mysterious Man, the father of the Baker.

== Early life ==
Zien was born in Milwaukee, Wisconsin, and graduated from Whitefish Bay High School and later from the University of Pennsylvania. He is Jewish. There, he was the chairman of the Mask and Wig Club, a historic collegiate musical comedy troupe.

== Career ==
Young Zien started in local theatrical productions. One of his early roles was as a child in a production of South Pacific at the Melody Top summer outdoor theatre in Milwaukee.

=== Stage ===
Zien's first major role was in 1977 at the Manhattan Theatre Club in the musical The Redemption Center (by Ron Cowen, Seth Glassman, and Sandy Naishtat), opposite Alice Playten as the young couple. Later, Chip received acclaim in the role of Marvin in William Finn's first musical, In Trousers, which ran Off-Broadway in 1979. In its sequels, March of the Falsettos (1981) and Falsettoland, this role was played by Michael Rupert, while Zien played Mendel, a role he reprised when these two one-act musicals were joined together and played Broadway as Falsettos in 1992. In 1998 Zien was featured in another Finn musical when he played a children's show host called Mr. Bungee, dressed as a frog, in A New Brain Off-Broadway at the Lincoln Center Mitzi E. Newhouse Theater. He received a 1999 Drama Desk Award nomination for Outstanding Featured Actor in a Musical for this role.

He appeared in the Off-Broadway play Isn't It Romantic by Wendy Wasserstein in a Playwrights Horizons production at the Lucille Lortel Theatre, opening in June 1984. He was nominated for the 1984 Drama Desk Award, Featured Actor in a Play. He originated the role of the Baker in Into the Woods in 1986 at the Old Globe Theatre in San Diego and on Broadway in 1987.

Zien starred on Broadway in Ride the Winds (as Inari) (1974), The Suicide (as Victor Victorovich) (1980), Grand Hotel (as Otto Kringelein) (1989) and The Boys from Syracuse (as Dromio of Ephesus) (2002). He appeared in the City Center Encores! staged concert production of Applause as Buzz Richards in 2008.

In 2005, Zien played the part of Goran in Chitty Chitty Bang Bang on Broadway.

In 2007, Zien was a replacement in the Broadway revival of Les Misérables in the role of Monsieur Thénardier.

From April 1 to June 19, 2011, Zien appeared in the Roundabout Theatre Company's production of The People in the Picture, which played at Studio 54 on Broadway.

Zien appeared in a revival of Into the Woods at the Delacorte Theater in Central Park from August 9 to September 1, 2012. He played the Mysterious Man, the father of the character he had originated in the original production 26 years prior.

Zien appeared in the Broadway musical It Shoulda Been You at the Brooks Atkinson Theatre as Murray with music by Barbara Anselmi, book and lyrics by Brian Hargrove. The show, marking the directorial debut of David Hyde Pierce, starred Tyne Daly, Harriet Harris, Sierra Boggess, and David Burtka, and opened in previews March 17, 2015, and officially on April 14.

Zien originated the role of Older Rabbi Josef Roman Cycowski of the famous Comedian Harmonists both Off-Broadway and on Broadway in the musical Harmony at both the Museum of Jewish Heritage at the National Theater Folksbiene (where he was nominated for a Drama Desk Award) and the Ethel Barrymore Theatre in 2022 and 2023, respectively.

=== Film and television ===
In 1973, Zien made his television debut on an episode of Love, American Style. More guest roles in television followed, and in the early 1980s, he began a stream of regular TV roles. In 1981, he appeared on Ryan's Hope as Daniel Thorne, the producer of the fictional Proud and the Passionate soap opera on the series in which the character Barbara Wilde (Judith Barcroft) was starring. Later that year, he began a two-year run in the freshman NBC sitcom Love, Sidney as Jason Stoller, the young, hot-shot ad agency director who was Sidney Shorr's (Tony Randall) boss. Immediately after Love, Sidney's cancellation, Zien was cast in a similar role on the ABC sitcom Reggie, an American adaptation of the British series The Fall and Rise of Reginald Perrin. He played C.J. Wilcox, the overbearing young boss of Richard Mulligan's Reggie Potter. The series aired as a summer replacement during August and September 1983, but was not renewed by ABC after the tryout run. In 1986, he provided the voice of the title character in Marvel Comics' Howard the Duck. Zien later starred on the short-lived CBS drama Shell Game in 1987.

In the 1990s, Zien was part of the ensemble cast of the CBS sitcom Almost Perfect (1995–96), playing neurotic screenwriter Gary Karp. Almost Perfect was cancelled shortly into its second season, but the series sustained its loyal following via reruns on USA Network not long after. Zien would return to regular roles in daytime drama, first on Guiding Light in early 1999, and by that summer, as newspaper reporter Donald Steele on All My Children, a role that would last until 2001.

From 1999 to 2000, Zien had a recurring guest role on the CBS primetime drama Now and Again as Gerald Misenbach. He has appeared repeatedly as Attorney Cromwell on Law & Order.

During the 2002–03 season, Zien was the announcer on daytime's The Caroline Rhea Show, which was based in New York (on the former Rosie O'Donnell Show set). In 2006, he appeared in the critically acclaimed film United 93 as Mark Rothenberg. He played Dr. Marsh in the vampire comedy film Rosencrantz and Guildenstern Are Undead.

== Personal life ==
Zien is married to former dancer and dancing instructor Susan Pilarre; the couple have two children.

== Filmography ==
=== Film ===
Year	Title	Role	Notes
1979	The Rose	Reporter	
1981	So Fine	Wise Guy In Disco	
1984	The House of God	Eddie	
1984	Grace Quigley	Dr. Herman	
1986	Howard the Duck	Howard T. Duck (voice)	
1987	Hello Again	Reporter #4	
1994	Mrs. Parker and the Vicious Circle	Franklin P. Adams	
1995	The Real Shlemiel	Treitel, The Donkey (voices)	
1998	Snake Eyes	Mickey Alter, Tyler's Lawyer	
1998	The Siege	Chief of Staff	
1999	Breakfast of Champions	Andy Wojeckowzski	
1999	Brooklyn Thrill Killers	Harry Lieberman	Short
2006	United 93	Mark Rothenberg	
2009	Rosencrantz and Guildenstern Are Undead	Dr. Marsh	
2012	Commentary	Clifford Blowman	
2013	That's News to Me	Dr. Henschel	Short
2017	Approaching a Breakthrough		Short
2017	Little Evil	Stepdad Therapist	
2022	Simchas and Sorrows	Mortimer	

=== Television ===
Year	Title	Role	Notes
1973	Love, American Style	Leo	Segment: "Love and the Generation Gasp"
1977	Off Campus	Josh	TV movie
1978	CHiPs	Davey	Episode: "The Grudge"
1978	Fix-it City	Irving	TV movie
1980	3-2-1 Contact	Einstein	2 episodes
1981	Ryan's Hope	Daniel Thorne	6 episodes
1981–1983	Love, Sidney	Jason Stoller	29 episodes
1982	NBC Special Treat	Jake	Episode: "Oh, Boy! Babies!"
1983	Reggie	C.J. Wilcox	6 episodes
1985, 1995	As the World Turns	Roastmaster / Arthur Howell	3 episodes
1986	Cheers	Jeff Warren	Episode: "The Peterson Principle"
1987	Shell Game	Bert Luna	6 episodes
1989	Newhart	Mr. Jenkins	Episode: "Cupcake in a Cage"
1990	Thirtysomething	Dr. Verny	Episode: "Post-Op"
1990–2002	Law & Order	Attorney Steven Cromwell / Mr. Green	4 episodes
1991	American Playhouse	The Baker	Episode: "Into the Woods"
1992	Quiet Killer	Dr. Lionel Katz	TV movie
1995	The Wright Verdicts	Assistant District Attorney Fred Keller	Episode: "Ex-Corpus Delicti"
1995	Cagney & Lacey: The View Through the Glass Ceiling	Assistant District Attorney Douglas Trayne	TV movie
1995–1997	Almost Perfect	Gary Karp	34 episodes
1996	Cagney & Lacey: True Convictions	Assistant District Attorney Trayne	TV movie
1997	Wings	Bippy, The Clown	Episode: "Oedipus Wrecks"
1997	Profiler		Episode: "Ambition in the Blood"
1998–2001	All My Children	Donald Steele	8 episodes
1999	Guiding Light	Aidan Heath	Unknown episodes
1999	Now and Again	Gerald Misenbach	4 episodes
1999	Cosby	Max	Episode: "One for the Books"
2000	Judging Amy	Dr. Ken Baker	Episode: "Gray vs. Gray"
2000	Madigan Men	Mr. Wolfe	Episode: "Meet the Wolfes"
2000–2001	Deadline	Sammy Klein	9 episodes
2001	Son of the Beach	Larry Big	Episode: "Area 69"
2003	CSI: Crime Scene Investigation	Lawyer	Episode: "Coming of Rage"
2006	Inseparable	Len	TV movie
2008	The Verdict		TV movie
2008	Lipstick Jungle	Andrew	Episode: "Chapter Fifteen: The Sisterhood of the Traveling Prada"
2009	Rescue Me	Arthur Frost	Episode: "Control"
2009	The Good Wife	Judge Lee Sutman	Episode: "Fixed"
2010	Ugly Betty	Frank	Episode: "Blackout!"
2016	Chicago P.D.	Judge Lurman	Episode: "Justice"
2016	The Night Of	Dr. Katz	2 episodes
2016	Mozart in the Jungle	Larry, The Night Watchman	Episode: "Circles Within Circles"
2018	Bull	Professor Jameson	3 episodes
2018	House of Cards	Dr. Charles Rosen	3 episodes
2019	City on a Hill	Adam Corso	Episode: "From Injustice Came the Way to Describe Justice"
2020	Hunters	Levi Libstein	Episode: "While Visions of Safta Danced in His Head"
2021	Zoey's Extraordinary Playlist	Alan	Episode: "Zoey's Extraordinary Trip"
2023	Ghosts	Lenny Lefkowitz	Episode: "Trevor's Body"

=== Theatre ===
Year	Title	Role	Venue	Notes
1956	South Pacific	Jerome	Melody Circus Theatre	Milwaukee, WI
1971	You're a Good Man, Charlie Brown	Snoopy	Ford's Theatre	
1972	How to Succeed in Business Without Really Trying	J. Pierrepont Finch	Equity Library Theatre	
1974	Ride The Winds	Inari	Bijou Theatre	Broadway debut
1974	All Over Town	Understudy for Charles, Demetrius, Detective Kirby, Laurent, Louie	Booth Theatre	
1977	The Redemption Center	Husband	Manhattan Theatre Club	
1979	In Trousers	Marvin	Playwrights Horizons	
1980	The Suicide	Victor Victorovich	ANTA Playhouse	
1981–1982	March of the Falsettos	Dr. Mendel	Playwrights Horizons	
1983–1984	Isn't It Romantic	Marty Sterling	Playwrights Horizons	
1985	Merrily We Roll Along	Charley Kringas	La Jolla Playhouse	Regional premiere
1986–1987	Into the Woods	The Baker	Old Globe Theatre	World premiere
1987–1989	Into the Woods	The Baker	Martin Beck Theatre	Original Broadway company
1989	Grand Hotel	Otto Kringelein	Martin Beck Theatre	Broadway replacement
1990	Falsettoland	Dr. Mendel	Playwrights Horizons	
1992–1993	Falsettos	Dr. Mendel	John Golden Theatre	Original Broadway company
1994	Falsettos	Dr. Mendel	Los Angeles; US tour	
1995	Anyone Can Whistle	Treasurer Cooley	Carnegie Hall	Benefit concert for the Gay Men's Health Crisis
1997	Into the Woods	The Baker	Broadway Theatre	10th Anniversary Concert
1998	A New Brain	Mr. Bungee	Mitzi E. Newhouse Theater	
2002	The Boys from Syracuse	Dromio of Ephesus	American Airlines Theatre	
2003	Falsettos	Dr. Mendel	Playwrights Horizons	
2003	Falsettos	Dr. Mendel	Skirball Cultural Center	
2004	They're Playing Our Song	Vernon Gersch	Colonial Theater	
2005	Chitty Chitty Bang Bang	Goran	Lyric Theatre	Original Broadway company
2007	Les Misérables	Monsieur Thénardier	Broadhurst Theatre	Broadway replacement
2008	Applause	Buzz Richards	New York City Center Encores!	
2008	The Country Girl	Phil Cook	Bernard B. Jacobs Theatre	
2011	The People in the Picture	Yossie Pinsker	Studio 54	
2012	Into the Woods	The Mysterious Man / Cinderella's Father	Delacorte Theater	
2013	The Big Knife	Nat Danziger	American Airlines Theatre	Original Broadway company
2015	It Shoulda Been You	Murray Steinberg	Brooks Atkinson Theatre	Original Broadway company
2015	Grand Hotel	Otto Kringelein	Studio 54	25th Anniversary Concert
2017	Candide	Max's Servant / Radu / Rich Jew / Judge Gomez / Father Bernard / First Gambler	New York City Opera	
2018	The Royal Family of Broadway	Oscar Wolfe	Barrington Stage Company	
2021	Caroline, or Change	Mr. Stopnick	Studio 54	
2022	Harmony	Older Rabbi Josef Roman Cycowski	Museum of Jewish Heritage	Off-Broadway premiere
2023–2024	Harmony	Older Rabbi Josef Roman Cycowski	Ethel Barrymore Theatre	Broadway premiere
2024	Titanic	Isidor Straus	New York City Center Encores!	
2025	Reunions	Don Gonzalo and others	New York City Center Stage II	Off-Broadway premiere
2026	The Reservoir	Shrimpy	Atlantic Theater Company	
2027	Paddington the Musical	Mr. Gruber/The Explorer	Al Hirschfeld Theatre	

== Awards and nominations ==
Year	Award	Category	Nominated work	Result
1984	Drama Desk Awards	Outstanding Featured Actor In A Play	Isn't It Romantic	Nominated
1999	Drama Desk Awards	Outstanding Featured Actor In A Musical	A New Brain	Nominated
2022	Drama Desk Awards	Outstanding Leading Actor In A Musical	Harmony	Nominated
