= Falsettos =

1992 musical by William Finn and James Lapine

- Original Logo
- Music: William Finn
- Lyrics: William Finn
- Book: William Finn; James Lapine
- Premiere: April 29, 1992: John Golden Theatre
- Productions: 1992 Broadway; 1993 U.S. tour 2016 Broadway revival 2019 U.S. tour 2019 West End
- Awards: Tony Award for Best Book of a Musical; Tony Award for Best Original Score

Falsettos is a sung-through musical with a book by William Finn and James Lapine, and music and lyrics by Finn. The musical consists of March of the Falsettos (1981) and Falsettoland (1990), the last two installments in a trio of one-act musicals that premiered off-Broadway (the first was In Trousers). The story centers on Marvin, who has left his wife to be with a male lover, Whizzer, and struggles to keep his family together. Much of the first act explores the impact his relationship with Whizzer has had on his family. The second act explores family dynamics that evolve as he and his ex-wife plan his son's bar mitzvah, which is complicated as Whizzer comes down with an early case of AIDS. Central to the musical are the themes of Jewish identity, gender roles, and gay life in the late 1970s and early 1980s.

Falsettos premiered on Broadway in 1992 and was nominated for seven Tony Awards, winning those for Best Book and Best Original Score. The musical was revived on Broadway in 2016, starring Christian Borle, Stephanie J. Block, Andrew Rannells, Anthony Rosenthal, and Brandon Uranowitz. The 2016 revival was filmed and adapted for the PBS Live from Lincoln Center television series, and aired on October 27, 2017. The revival was nominated for five Tony Awards, including Best Revival of a Musical. Both the original cast and the 2016 revival cast performed at the Tony Awards. Other revivals include tours in Australia and the United Kingdom. The musical was praised by critics for its melodic compositions, humor, character development, and positive portrayal of non-traditional family structures.

== Background ==
=== Inception ===
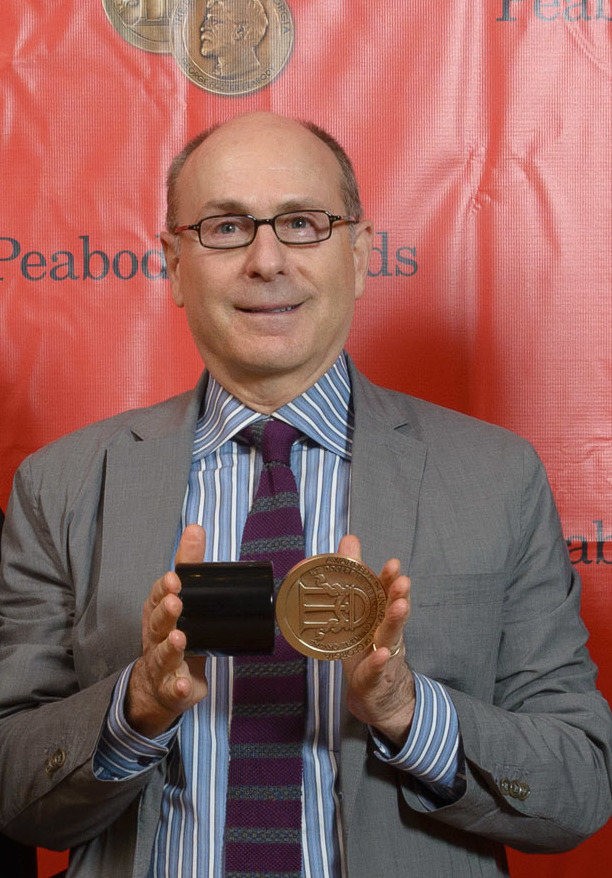
James Lapine, director and co-book writer

Composer William Finn began his theater career with a one-act musical In Trousers (1979), which centers on the character Marvin questioning his sexuality. It was produced twice at Playwrights Horizons off-Broadway, opening in December 8, 1978 and again in February 21, 1979. It was also produced off-Broadway at Second Stage Theater in March 1981. After In Trousers received sharply unfavorable reviews, Finn considered abandoning musical theater and attending medical school. He felt that "if the critic for the Times at that time had been more responsible, it would have been a considerable debut. But as it was, he just said it was junk." Finn struggled in his science classes and discarded his medical school plans, turning back to writing about the character of Marvin.

Finn soon wrote the songs for another one-act musical about Marvin and his family, March of the Falsettos, collaborating with director James Lapine on the book. Actress Alison Fraser, who originated the role of Trina, contributed additional vocal orchestrations. This premiered at Playwrights Horizons in April 1981, ran there through September and moved to the Westside Theatre in October 1981. March of the Falsettos received more positive critical reception than In Trousers: Ellen Pall of The New York Times wrote that Finn's "brilliant form combined with the absolute topicality of his social themes first bowled critics over". In 1989, Finn premiered another musical, Romance in Hard Times, which did not feature any of the characters of Falsettos; it was not a success.

Almost a decade after March of the Falsettos, in the wake of the 1980s AIDS epidemic, Finn followed with Falsettoland. The musical concluded Finn's "Marvin Trilogy" of one-act pieces about Marvin and his circle, beginning with In Trousers and March of the Falsettos. Falsettoland opened at Playwrights Horizons on June 28, 1990, then moved to the Lucille Lortel Theatre, on September 16, 1990, where it closed on January 27, 1991. It won the 1991 Lucille Lortel Award for Outstanding Musical and the 1991 Drama Desk Award for Outstanding Lyrics.

=== Composition ===
Finn and Lapine then combined March of the Falsettos and Falsettoland to form a full-length show, titled Falsettos, slightly altering them to form a "more unified, more thematically consistent" musical. In writing both acts of Falsettos, Finn prioritized making the audience laugh, believing that provoking laughter is more challenging than garnering tears. Each musical was developed during rehearsals, particularly as Finn was a disorganized writer and composer. Finn often composed songs without a clear idea of where they would fit in the musical; he struggled to decide where to place the bar mitzvah in the action. The idea to set it in the hospital came to him in a dream. According to Stephen Bogardus, who played Whizzer in the original cast of both shows as well as in Falsettos, Lapine came up with the idea to incorporate racquetball scenes in Falsettoland, and he and his racquetball partner, Bogardus, added racquetball terminology into the dialogue. The haftorah read by Jason at his bar mitzvah was originally the same one read at Finn's own bar mitzvah, but he "got bored in the middle of writing it" and added words that he enjoyed musically but are grammatically incorrect in Hebrew. Some songs, including "Four Jews in a Room Bitching", originated with Finn humming improvised melodies while strolling the streets of New York City.

== Synopsis ==
=== Act I: March of the Falsettos ===
In 1979, New York City, Marvin, his ten-year-old son Jason, his psychiatrist Mendel, and his lover Whizzer are in the midst of an argument ("Four Jews in a Room Bitching"). Marvin explains the situation: he has left his wife, Trina, for a man, Whizzer, but no one is happy with his attempts to integrate Whizzer into the family ("A Tight-Knit Family"). At Marvin's suggestion, Trina visits Mendel and explains she is having trouble accepting the end of her marriage and her failure to be a perfect wife. Mendel, instantly attracted to her, tries to reassure her that she is not to blame ("Love Is Blind"). Marvin and Whizzer note that they have very little in common but are intensely attracted to each other and worry that their feelings for one another are fading ("The Thrill of First Love"). In a series of therapy sessions with Mendel, Marvin discusses his relationship with Whizzer, his failed relationship with Trina (with Mendel pressing him for intimate details about her), and his inability to connect with his son ("Marvin at the Psychiatrist - A Three-Part Mini-Opera"). Jason is worried that he will turn out to be gay like his father ("My Father's a Homo"). His parents suggest that he see Mendel to address his mood swings. Jason refuses to listen to his parents but agrees to go to therapy once Whizzer also recommends it ("Everyone Tells Jason to See a Psychiatrist").

Marvin and Whizzer fight over Whizzer's disdain for monogamy and Marvin's attempt to force him into the role of a housewife ("This Had Better Come to a Stop"). Trina is concerned that Whizzer is taking her place in the family and has a mental breakdown ("I'm Breaking Down"). Trina requests that Mendel provide in-home therapy for Jason ("Please Come to Our House"). Mendel gets to know Trina and Jason through these sessions ("Jason's Therapy"). Mendel clumsily proposes to Trina ("A Marriage Proposal"). She accepts, sparking jealousy in Marvin ("A Tight-Knit Family - Reprise"). Trina is frustrated with the male-dominated world she lives in and the immaturity of the men around her ("Trina's Song"). The four boys sing a hymn to masculinity, the three adults singing in falsetto to match Jason's unbroken voice ("March of the Falsettos"). Trina collects herself and calms down from her frustration ("Trina's Song - Reprise").

Marvin tries to teach Whizzer how to play chess, but both of their bitterness boils over, causing them to fight and break up ("The Chess Game"). Meanwhile, Trina and Mendel move in together ("Making a Home"). As he packs his things to leave, Whizzer reflects on his life and relationship with Marvin. He has been used by other men his whole life, and finally decides that he doesn't want to live like that anymore ("The Games I Play"). After receiving Mendel and Trina's marriage announcement, Marvin breaks down in rage and slaps Trina ("Marvin Hits Trina"). Shocked by his actions, everyone confesses that they never intended to feel so deeply about the people in their lives, and they accept the pain that love can bring ("I Never Wanted to Love You"). Jason discovers his attraction to girls, to his relief. In the wake of the destruction of his relationships with both Whizzer and Trina, Marvin sits Jason down for a talk. Marvin tells Jason that no matter what kind of man Jason turns out to be, Marvin will always be there for him, ending the act with the two in a warm embrace ("Father to Son").

=== Act II: Falsettoland ===
It is 1981, two years later. Two new characters are introduced: Marvin's lesbian neighbors, Dr. Charlotte, an internist, and Cordelia, a gentile caterer who is beginning to attempt to offer Jewish cuisine. Marvin has not seen Whizzer for two years and has not gotten over him ("Falsettoland"). Marvin observes that it's time for him to grow up and get over himself ("About Time"). He has managed to maintain his relationship with Jason and now shares split custody of him with Trina, who has married Mendel. Marvin and Trina begin planning Jason's bar mitzvah, and each character has a different opinion regarding how it should be celebrated ("Year of the Child"). Later, at Jason's Little League Baseball game, Jason ponders which girls he will invite to the bar mitzvah ("Miracle of Judaism"). Whizzer arrives at the baseball game after being invited by Jason. Marvin cautiously asks Whizzer on a date just as Jason manages to hit the ball ("The Baseball Game"). An interlude ends with everyone reflecting on how wonderful life is ("A Day in Falsettoland"). Soon afterwards, Marvin and Trina argue at length about the logistics of the bar mitzvah ("The Fight"). Jason wants to call it off because of all the arguing, and Mendel consoles him, telling him that hating his parents is normal for his age, but everyone eventually matures ("Everyone Hates His Parents").

Later, Marvin sits in bed looking at a sleeping Whizzer, and wonders at how much he loves him ("What More Can I Say?"). Dr. Charlotte, meanwhile, is becoming aware that young gay men in the city are arriving at the hospital sick with a mysterious illness that no one understands ("Something Bad Is Happening"). Whizzer collapses suddenly during a game of racquetball and is hospitalized ("More Racquetball"). Trina is disturbed to realize how upset she is at his condition ("Holding to the Ground"). In Whizzer's hospital room, everyone gathers to cheer him up, commenting on how well he looks. They agree that it is days like this that make them believe in God, but Jason is honest and tells Whizzer that he looks awful ("Days Like This"). Jason wants to wait for Whizzer to get well before holding his bar mitzvah, but Mendel and Trina sit him down to inform him that Whizzer may not recover ("Canceling the Bar Mitzvah"). Marvin sits in Whizzer's hospital room, joined by Cordelia and Dr. Charlotte, and the four reaffirm their commitment to each other despite Whizzer's worsening situation ("Unlikely Lovers").

As Whizzer's condition deteriorates, Jason turns to God, offering to "get bar mitzvah-ed" in exchange for Whizzer getting better ("Another Miracle of Judaism"). Dr. Charlotte explains more about the illness to Marvin and implies that Marvin may become sick as well ("Something Bad Is Happening - Reprise"). Whizzer's illness becomes terminal, and he resolves to face death with dignity and courage ("You Gotta Die Sometime"). Everyone bursts into the room; Jason has decided he wants to hold the ceremony in Whizzer's hospital room ("Jason's Bar Mitzvah"). As Jason completes his recitation, Whizzer collapses and is taken from the room, followed by everyone but Marvin. Marvin, left alone, asks the departed Whizzer what his life would be like if they had not loved each other. Whizzer's spirit appears, asking if Marvin regrets their relationship, and Marvin states he would do it all again ("What Would I Do?"). Marvin's friends and family surround him, and he breaks down in their arms. Jason places Whizzer’s king chess piece on the casket, representing the time they spent together playing chess. Mendel steps forward, declaring: "This is where we take a stand" ("Falsettoland - Reprise").

== Musical numbers ==
Act One

- "Four Jews in a Room Bitching" – Whizzer, Marvin, Jason, Mendel, and Trina
- "A Tight-Knit Family" – Marvin
- "Love Is Blind" – Marvin, Jason, Whizzer, Mendel, and Trina
- "Thrill of First Love" – Marvin and Whizzer
- "Marvin at the Psychiatrist" – Mendel, Marvin, Jason, and Whizzer
- "My Father's a Homo" – Jason
- "Everyone Tells Jason to See a Psychiatrist" – Jason, Marvin, Trina, and Whizzer
- "This Had Better Come to a Stop" – Marvin, Whizzer, Jason, Trina, and Mendel
- "I'm Breaking Down" – Trina (Added for 1982 LA run of "March of the Falsettos" and Hartford Stage's "Falsettos" production; written originally for In Trousers)
- "Please Come to Our House" – Mendel, Trina, and Jason
- "Jason's Therapy" – Mendel, Trina, Whizzer, Marvin, and Jason
- "A Marriage Proposal" – Mendel
- "A Tight-Knit Family (Reprise)" – Mendel and Marvin
- "Trina's Song" – Trina
- "March of the Falsettos" – Mendel, Marvin, Jason, and Whizzer
- "Trina's Song (Reprise)" – Trina
- "The Chess Game" – Marvin and Whizzer
- "Making a Home" – Mendel, Jason, Trina, and Whizzer
- "The Games I Play" – Whizzer
- "Marvin Hits Trina" – Marvin, Mendel, Jason, Trina, and Whizzer
- "I Never Wanted to Love You" – Marvin, Mendel, Jason, Trina, and Whizzer
- "Father to Son" – Marvin and Jason

Act Two

- "Falsettoland" – Mendel & Company
- "About Time" – Marvin & Company
- "Year of the Child" – Marvin, Trina, Mendel, Jason, Charlotte, and Cordelia
- "Miracle of Judaism" – Jason
- "The Baseball Game" – Company
- "A Day in Falsettoland" – Company
- "The Fight" – Mendel, Jason, Marvin, and Trina
- "Everyone Hates His Parents" – Mendel, Jason, Marvin, and Trina
- "What More Can I Say" – Marvin
- "Something Bad Is Happening" – Charlotte and Cordelia
- "More Racquetball" – Marvin and Whizzer
- "Holding to the Ground" – Trina
- "Days Like This" – Company
- "Cancelling the Bar Mitzvah" – Mendel, Trina, and Jason
- "Unlikely Lovers" – Marvin, Whizzer, Charlotte, and Cordelia
- "Another Miracle of Judaism" – Jason
- "Something Bad Is Happening (Reprise)" – Charlotte
- "You Gotta Die Sometime" – Whizzer
- "Jason's Bar Mitzvah" – The Company
- "What Would I Do?" – Marvin, Whizzer
- "Falsettoland (Reprise)" – Mendel

Encore

- "In Trousers" – Marvin and Ladies †

† - Indicates a song not included on the cast recording

== Productions ==
=== Original Broadway production ===
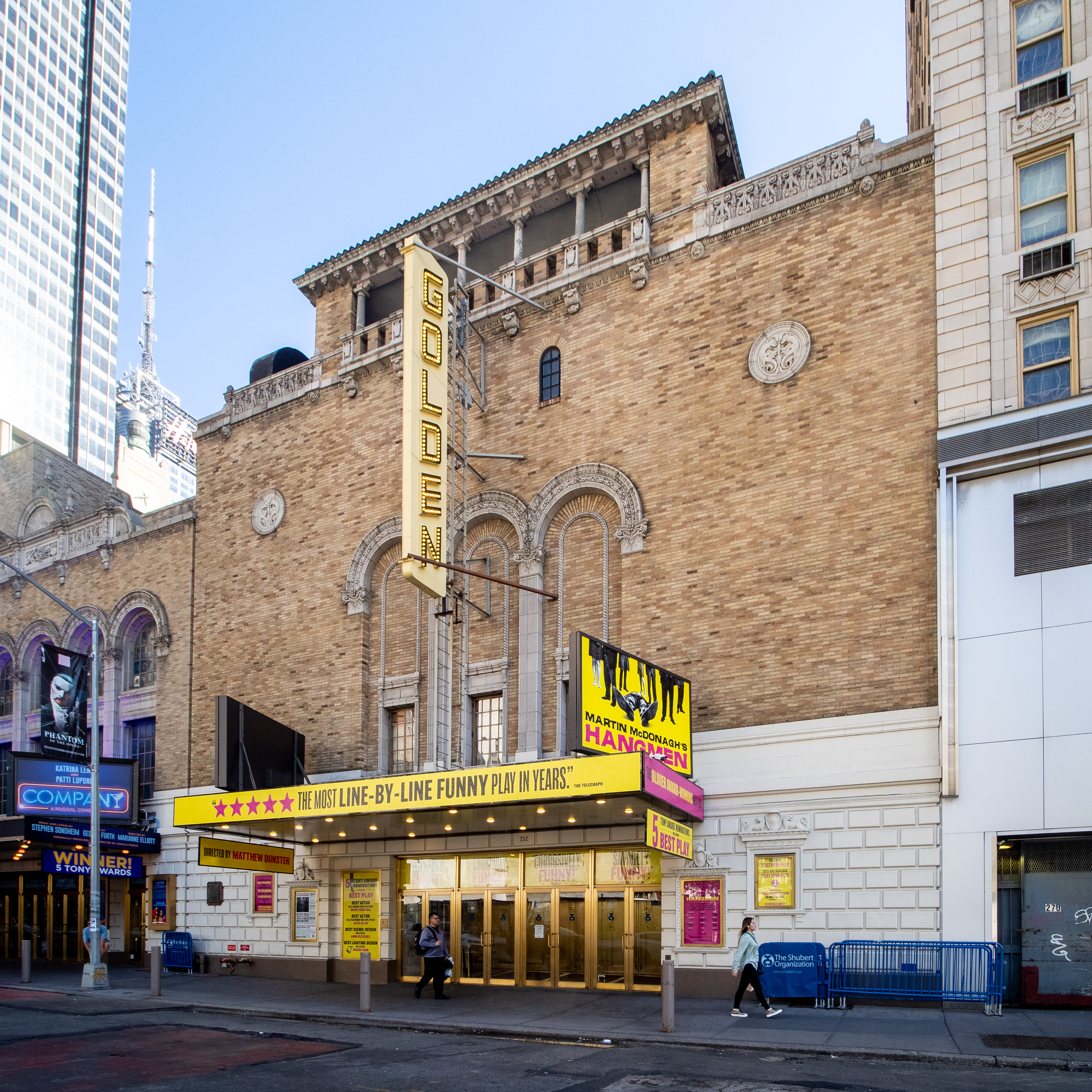
The John Golden Theatre

Falsettos opened on Broadway at the John Golden Theatre on April 29, 1992, and closed on June 27, 1993, after 487 performances. Directed by James Lapine, the cast included Michael Rupert as Marvin, Stephen Bogardus as Whizzer, Barbara Walsh as Trina, Chip Zien as Mendel (he played Marvin in In Trousers), Jonathan Kaplan as Jason, Heather MacRae as Charlotte, and Carolee Carmello as Cordelia. Rupert, Bogardus, and Zien reprised their roles from the original off-Broadway productions of March of the Falsettos and Falsettoland, MacRae reprised her role from Falsettoland, and Walsh reprised her role from a Hartford Stage regional production of Falsettoland. Scenic design was by Douglas Stein, costumes by Ann Hould-Ward, and lighting by Frances Aronson. In January 1993, Broadway and screen star Mandy Patinkin took over the role of Marvin from Rupert. The cast and producers were unsure if the show would find a strong following on Broadway, but were encouraged when Frank Rich of The New York Times gave the musical a positive review.

Falsettos, the last show of Broadway's 1991–92 season, had a budget of $957,000, a low budget by Broadway standards. Producers Barry and Fran Weissler tried various marketing strategies to promote the musical. Hoping to create an easily-identifiable logo inspired by the minimalist design of Cats, the Weisslers used the work of artist Keith Haring in which two adults and a child hold up a bright red heart. Although audiences were enthusiastic at previews, the producers worried that the marketing strategy would not draw a large audience, and Barry Weissler explained that "Since Keith died of AIDS, many people felt the drawing was meant to attract a gay audience." The Weisslers then hired advertising agency LeDonne, Wilner & Weiner, who launched a promotional campaign centered on photographing audience members "not targeting specific Catholic or Jewish or family audiences, but trying to get across the idea that Falsettos is for everyone." The advertisers invited the newly-crowned Miss America, who had recently launched an Atlantic City-based AIDS awareness campaign, to attend the show and be photographed. In the following months, the producers began to earn back their initial investment and to profit from the show.

=== Australian productions ===
In 1994, Sydney Theatre Company presented an Australian production directed by Wayne Harrison and featuring John O'May as Marvin, Gina Riley as Trina, Tony Sheldon as Mendel, and Simon Burke as Whizzer. After playing at the Sydney Opera House's Drama Theatre from 12 January to 5 March 1994, the production toured Victoria, Hobart and Canberra. Riley and Sheldon were both awarded Green Room Awards for this production, winning Best Female Artist in a Leading Role and Best for Best Male Artist in a Supporting Role, respectively.

In 2014 Darlinghurst Theatre Company presented a revival directed by Stephen Colyer. The cast featured Tamlyn Henderson as Marvin, Katrina Retallick as Trina, Stephen Anderson as Mendel, Ben Hall as Whizzer, Elise McCann as Cordelia and Margi de Ferranti as Charlotte. The production played as part of the Sydney Mardi Gras festival throughout February and March 2014. In her review of the production, Cassie Tongue of Aussie Theatre viewed the production as a "promising sign of things to come" for the Sydney theater scene, and praised the casting by remarking, "Henderson's Marvin and Retallick's Trina are clear standouts, and de Ferranti and McCann are so essential to the emotional weight of the second act that they are just as impressive as if they had been there from the first".

In 2022, the National Institute of Dramatic Art presented a production directed by David Berthold, with music direction by Michael Tyack and choreography by Kelley Abbey.

=== 2016 Broadway revival ===
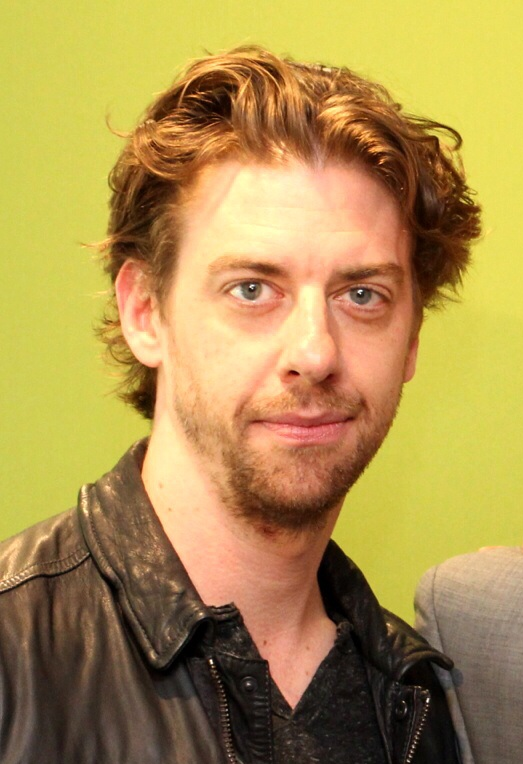
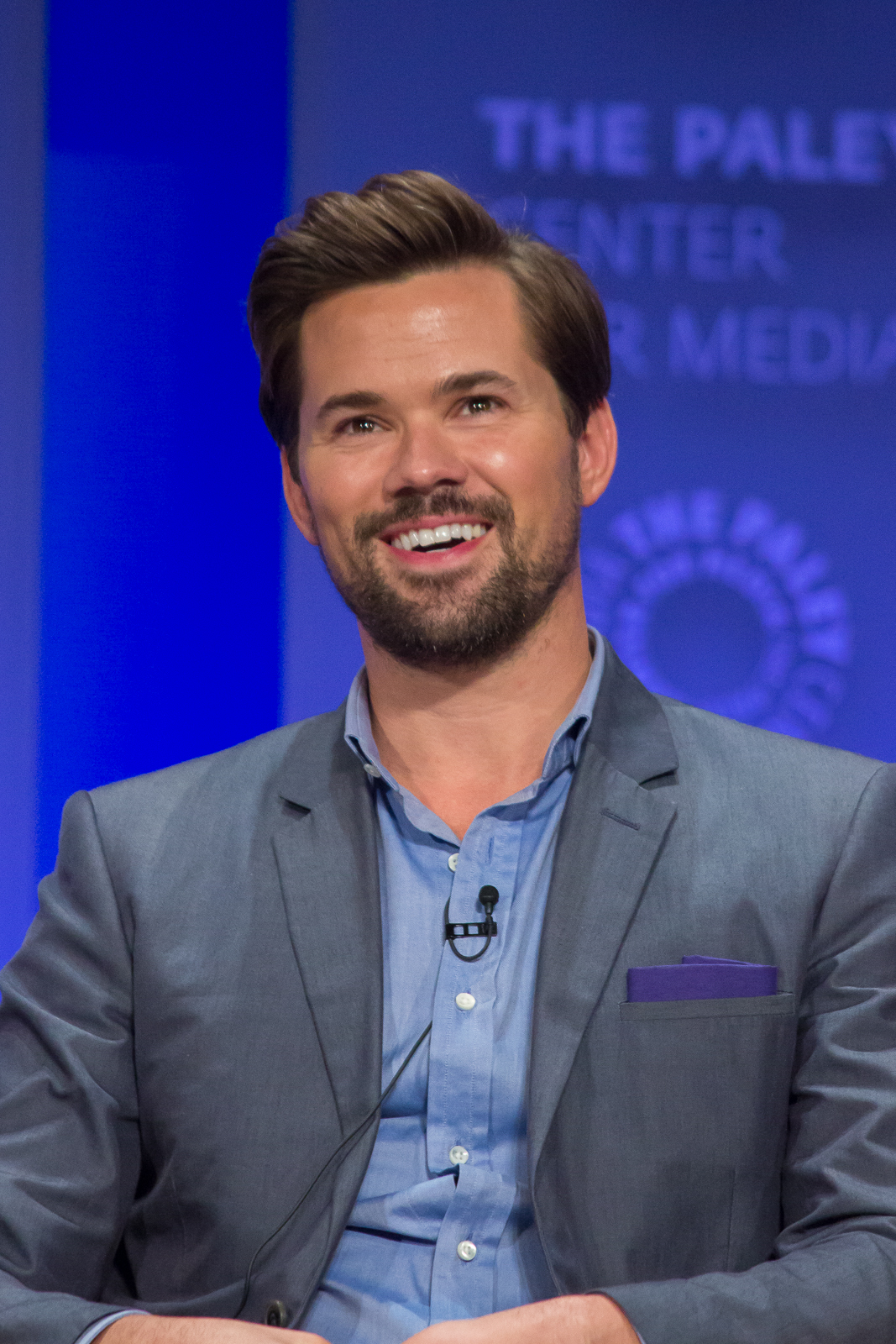
In the 2016 revival, Christian Borle (left) and Andrew Rannells (right) starred as Marvin and Whizzer, respectively.

Producer Jordan Roth announced in 2015 that he would revive the show under the direction of James Lapine in the spring of 2016. The set design incorporated a cube made of large blocks that the actors rearranged throughout the show. The production began previews on Broadway at the Walter Kerr Theatre on September 29, 2016, and opened officially on October 27. Christian Borle, Andrew Rannells, Stephanie J. Block, and Brandon Uranowitz played Marvin, Whizzer, Trina, and Mendel, respectively. Tracie Thoms played Dr. Charlotte, Betsy Wolfe played Cordelia, and Anthony Rosenthal played Jason.

The production closed on January 8, 2017. Two performances were filmed on January 3 and 4, 2017, which were repackaged into a presentation for the PBS television series Live from Lincoln Center and aired on October 27, 2017.

A North American tour of the 2016 Broadway revival launched in February 2019, under Lapine's direction, and ended in late June 2019. Max von Essen starred as Marvin, with Eden Espinosa as Trina, Nick Adams as Whizzer, and Nick Blaemire as Mendel.

A ten-year anniversary reunion concert of the revival, directed and choreographed by the production's assistant choreographer Ellenore Scott, was held at Carnegie Hall on October 18, 2026. The adult cast all reprised their roles; Jason was primarily portrayed by child actor Matthew Eby, with the grown-up Anthony Rosenthal taking over partway through "Jason's Bar Mitzvah". Due to high ticket demand, two additional performances were later added for November 2, 2026 and February 8, 2027. An additional run of performances will play on London's West End at the London Palladium on February 23, 24, and 25, 2027.

=== 2019 off West End ===
Selladoor Worldwide announced that they would produce Falsettos at The Other Palace, an off West End theatre in London, for a limited run. The show began previews on August 30, 2019, before officially opening on September 5. The original cast featured Daniel Boys as Marvin, Laura Pitt-Pulford as Trina, Oliver Savile as Whizzer, Joel Montague as Mendel, Gemma Knight-Jones as Charlotte, and Natasha J. Barnes as Cordelia. The show closed on November 23, 2019.

Before the production opened, a group of more than 20 Jewish actors and playwrights, including Miriam Margolyes, Maureen Lipman, and Adam Lenson, signed an open letter to the producers, concerned about the lack of Jewish presence within the cast and creatives. Despite this, the show opened to mostly positive reviews, with critics praising the cast, story, and music, but aiming criticism at the scenic design. The show was nominated for Best Video Design and won Best Off-West End Production at the 2020 WhatsOnStage Awards.

== Themes ==
=== Judaism ===
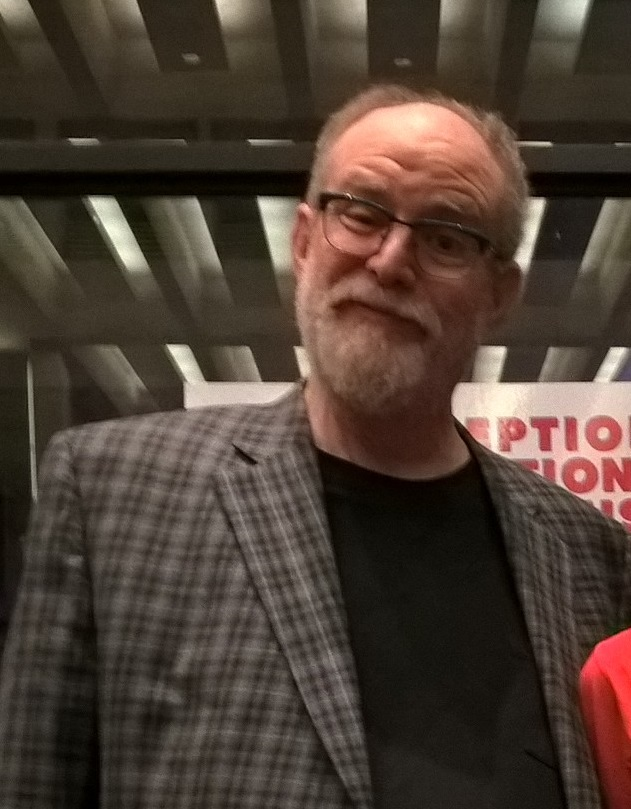
Finn's Jewish upbringing inspired themes in Falsettos.

Jewish culture and identity plays a significant role in Falsettos, humorously depicting "Jewish neuroses and self-deprecation." The stage version begins with the four male characters dressed in clothing from Biblical times before they remove these robes to reveal modern clothing. In the song, Marvin, Mendel, and Jason state that they are Jewish, while Whizzer specifies that he is half-Jewish. The first act, March of the Falsettos, was originally intended to be titled Four Jews in a Room Bitching until Lapine insisted that Finn change the title. Writers Raymond and Zelda Knapp compared the depiction of the AIDS epidemic in Falsettos to the foreshadowing of the Holocaust in Fiddler on the Roof, noting that both works show a relatively innocent atmosphere before tragedy strikes.

Jason's bar mitzvah is a major plot point. Jesse Oxfeld of The Forward wrote that the musical is "in its message of accommodation and dedication and, well, l'dor v'dor, very Jewish." He also noted that due to the musical's matter-of-fact depiction of homosexuality, "the lesbians are most interesting for being goyim." The song "The Baseball Game" pokes fun at a stereotypical lack of athletic prowess among American Jews, but Mendel then points out the success of Jewish baseball players Sandy Koufax and Hank Greenberg. Finn, who played Little League baseball as a child, invited Koufax to a performance of Falsettos in Los Angeles, and Koufax was reportedly offended by the joke.

=== AIDS epidemic ===
While Falsettos never explicitly names HIV or AIDS, the disease plays a major role in the second half of the musical, with Whizzer suffering from the disease and ultimately losing his life to it. Examples of implicit references to the virus include "Something that kills/Something infectious/Something that spreads from one man to another" and "Something so bad that words have lost their meaning". The first half of the musical takes place in 1979, before the start of the epidemic, and the second half takes place in 1981, the year the epidemic began, leading to a tone shift from primarily comedy to tragedy. Lapine has described the AIDS epidemic as "a time frame in our past that has somewhat been forgotten."

Finn said about Falsettoland: "I can't have AIDS be peripheral in the show, and I don't know that I could write about AIDS head-on because the horror is too real and I don't want to trivialize it." Finn later described Falsettos as a "catharsis for people who've been going through the AIDS epidemic as well as for people not going through it," hoping that the show would allow the latter to empathize with people who had lived through it first-hand. The inclusion of lesbian characters Charlotte and Cordelia is a tribute to the lesbians who assisted gay men during the epidemic. The show also explores Trina's perspective on Whizzer's illness in "Holding to the Ground", where she shows solidarity with him despite previously struggling to accept his relationship with Marvin.

The revival of the show in 2016 was partly intended to educate LGBTQ youth about gay life in the 1980s and to instill a sense of gratitude at how both societal attitudes toward homosexuality and HIV/AIDS treatment have vastly improved since that period. Lapine was inspired to revisit the show when attending a performance of The Normal Heart with a recent college graduate. He recalled: "At intermission, she just looked at me and she said, 'Well, I kind of know about AIDS, but was it really like this?'" AIDS activist and playwright of The Normal Heart Larry Kramer attended a performance of the 2016 Falsettos revival. Andrew Rannells, who portrayed Whizzer, noted his admiration for Kramer's activism and the impact of having him in the audience.

=== Masculinity ===
Critic Charles Isherwood asserts that definitions of masculinity form "a sharp undercurrent in the show." In the first act, Marvin attempts to force Whizzer into the role of "pretty boy homemaker," which causes Whizzer to pull away from the relationship. Though Marvin is in a same-sex relationship, he still tries to assume the more traditionally masculine role of the provider. Daily Herald writer Jennifer Farrar characterized the arguments between Marvin and Whizzer as "testosterone-laden." The song "March of the Falsettos" is an ode to the immaturity of the male characters, and features the three adult male characters singing in falsetto to match Jason's preadolescent voice. In "Trina's Song", Trina complains about the men who rule the world and "her fondness for the man-babies in her life battling with exasperation and needy resentment at every turn."

Trina's struggles with the men in her life are also expressed in "I'm Breaking Down", where she manically chops bananas and carrots, "an unusual combination but an appropriately phallic one." About the major plot point of Jason's bar mitzvah, Finn explains: "There's so much about what it means to be a man in the show. It's not only the kid becoming a man – it's kind of all the men becoming men. It's a metaphor that resonates." Critics interpreted the set design of the 2016 revival to reflect immaturity by representing the New York City skyline in the form of children's building blocks. The musical additionally explores the link between masculinity and sexuality, with Jason questioning his sexuality and worrying that his father's homosexuality could be genetically passed down to him.

== Reception ==
=== Early performances ===
Frank Rich of The New York Times praised the 1992 opening night performance as "exhilarating and heartbreaking", speaking favorably of the musical's cast, humor, and emotional depth. He called Jason's bar mitzvah scene "one of the most moving you've ever seen" and explained that in addressing the AIDS epidemic, "It is the heaven-sent gift of Mr. Finn and company that they make you believe that the love, no less fortissimo, somehow lingers on." Joe Brown of The Washington Post praised the chemistry between Marvin and Whizzer, calling their relationship "sexily combative". Brown also highlighted the emotional ending, stating that the audience, "which began the play roaring with laughter, is left in tear-soaked shreds". Jeremy Gerard of Variety commented that "to call Falsettos a musical about gay life in modern times is also to shortchange its tremendous appeal as a masterly feat of comic storytelling and as a visionary musical theater work". Gerard thought "Four Jews in a Room Bitching" "hilarious" and praised the musical's pacing, opining that "Lapine and Finn tell their complex story with astonishing economy".

In her report about Finn's Tony Award acceptance speech in June 1992, Kim Hubbard of People characterized Falsettos as both "a laugh-a-minute musical" and "a tragedy filled with hope". Sylvie Drake of the Los Angeles Times called a 1993 San Diego performance a "stunning ode to modern living" noting that the musical's "virtuosity is in its mastery of the bittersweet – and eventually the tragic – wailing over life's nasty habit of giving and taking away, but without wasting time on self-pity. Instead, the show makes intricate songs from the sour lemons. And the result is glorious lemonade." In 2016, Daily Herald writer Jennifer Farrar wrote that the play was considered "groundbreaking for its time" upon its 1992 debut.

John Simon of New York magazine, however, lamented the musical's "big lie" of portraying the illness of AIDS to look "gentle, elegant–something like a nineteenth-century heroine's wistful expiring of consumption–where we all know that it is grueling and gruesome". Clive Barnes of the New York Post wrote that the musical "clatters like a set of false teeth in a politically correct ventriloquist's dummy". Douglas Watt of the New York Daily News described the musical as "too sweet and sugary by far" and its plot as "sticky with sentiment", comparing the tone of Falsettos to that of a soap opera. In his book The Complete Book of 1990s Broadway Musicals, Dan Dietz called the musical "commendable … but weak and disappointing in execution" and described the characters as "too bright, too self-aware, too articulate, and too 'on'". He further commented that "one never had time to get to gradually know and discover [the characters] because they were forever explaining themselves."

=== 2016 revival ===
Reviewing the 2016 revival, Alexis Soloski of The Guardian called the show "radically intimate" and praised the musical's emotional depth and character development. She viewed the first half as more complex than the second, which she described as "more conventional, its narrative arc familiar, its characterizations less intense, particularly those of the lesbians." Jesse Green of Vulture described the ending as "almost unbearably moving." Chris Jones of the Chicago Tribune wrote that Falsettos "throbs with passion and compassion, a masterwork strong enough to bare [sic] formative comparison to the work of Stephen Sondheim, but a whole lot more cuddly of a show." He praised the performances of Block, Thoms, and Wolfe. Emily Bruno of BroadwayWorld wrote that it was "groundbreaking" and "achingly poignant."

Linda Winer of Newsweek praised Finn's "enormously quotable, conversational lyrics that catch in the throat as often as they stick in the mind." Winer also commented on the show's set design, noting that though the blocks "can get a bit monotonous, they support the passion by getting out of the play's powerful way." Marilyn Stasio of Variety praised the cast and characterized the music as "a fusion of tuneful melodies with insightful lyrics." Christopher Kelly of NJ.com praised Rannells and Block, but felt that Borle "comes across as too staid – it [sic] impossible to see what Whizzer sees in the guy." Melissa Rose Bernardo of Entertainment Weekly gave the show a B+ and noted the musical's emotional impact. She described "The Baseball Game" as "a work of lyrical comic genius."

== Recordings ==
The original cast recordings of the Off-Broadway March of the Falsettos and Falsettoland were both released by DRG Records on January 1, 1991.

The Broadway revival cast album was released on January 27, 2017. This album peaked at number two on the Billboard Cast Albums chart and number 98 on the Billboard Album Sales chart. PBS aired a filmed performance of the revival as part of Live from Lincoln Center on October 27, 2017. For this recording, several lines were edited for profanity.

== Notable casts ==
| Character | Broadway | First National Tour | Second National Tour | Australia Premiere | Broadway Revival | Third National Tour | Off-West End |
| Character | 1992 | | 1993 | 1994 | 2016 | 2019 | |
|---|---|---|---|---|---|---|---|
| Marvin | Michael Rupert | Adrian Zmed | Gregg Edelman | John O'May | Christian Borle | Max von Essen | Daniel Boys |
| Trina | Barbara Walsh | Carolee Carmello | Carolee Carmello | Gina Riley | Stephanie J. Block | Eden Espinosa | Laura Pitt-Pulford |
| Whizzer | Stephen Bogardus | Ray Walker | Peter Reardon | Simon Burke | Andrew Rannells | Nick Adams | Oliver Savile |
| Mendel | Chip Zien | Stuart Zagnit | Adam Heller | Tony Sheldon | Brandon Uranowitz | Nick Blaemire | Joel Montague |
| Jason | Jonathan Kaplan | Jeffrey Landman | Ramzi Khalaf | Michael Hamilton, Kerry-Andre Palavicino, & Brent Stiller | Anthony Rosenthal | Jonah Mussolino, Thatcher Jacobs, & Jim Kaplan | Albert Atack, George Kennedy, Elliot Morris, & James Williams |
| Charlotte | Heather MacRae | Barbara Marineau | Barbara Marineau | Valerie Bader | Tracie Thoms | Bryonha Marie Parham | Gemma Knight-Jones |
| Cordelia | Carolee Carmello | Yvette Lawrence | Jessica Molaskey | Sharon Millerchip | Betsy Wolfe | Audrey Cardwell | Natasha J Barnes |

Replacements/Transfers (Original Broadway Cast)

- Marvin – Adrian Zmed, Mandy Patinkin, Gregg Edelman
- Trina – Randy Graff
- Mendel – Jason Graae
- Cordelia – Maureen Moore
- Jason – Sivan Cotel, Anthony Roth Costanzo

== Awards and accolades ==
Falsettos won Best Original Score and Best Book of a Musical at the 46th Tony Awards. At the 46th Tony Awards, the original cast performed a medley consisting of "Falsettoland", "My Father's a Homo", and "The Baseball Game". The 2016 revival was nominated for five Tony Awards, including Best Revival of a Musical. The 2016 revival cast performed "A Day in Falsettoland" at the 71st Tony Awards.

=== Original Broadway production ===
| Year | Award | Category | Nominee | Result | Ref. |
|---|---|---|---|---|---|
| 1992 | Tony Award | Best Musical | | Nominated | |
| 1992 | Tony Award | Best Book of a Musical | William Finn and James Lapine | Won | |
| 1992 | Tony Award | Best Original Score | William Finn | Won | |
| 1992 | Tony Award | Best Performance by a Leading Actor in a Musical | Michael Rupert | Nominated | |
| 1992 | Tony Award | Best Performance by a Featured Actor in a Musical | Jonathan Kaplan | Nominated | |
| 1992 | Tony Award | Best Performance by a Featured Actress in a Musical | Barbara Walsh | Nominated | |
| 1992 | Tony Award | Best Direction of a Musical | James Lapine | Nominated | |
| 1992 | Drama Desk Award | Outstanding Revival of a Musical | | Nominated | |
| 1992 | Drama Desk Award | Outstanding Featured Actress in a Musical | Barbara Walsh | Nominated | |
| 1992 | Theatre World Award | | Jonathan Kaplan | Won | |

=== 2016 Broadway revival ===
| Year | Award | Category | Nominee | Result | Ref. |
|---|---|---|---|---|---|
| 2017 | Tony Award | Best Revival of a Musical | | Nominated | |
| 2017 | Tony Award | Best Actor in a Musical | Christian Borle | Nominated | |
| 2017 | Tony Award | Best Featured Actor in a Musical | Andrew Rannells | Nominated | |
| 2017 | Tony Award | Best Featured Actor in a Musical | Brandon Uranowitz | Nominated | |
| 2017 | Tony Award | Best Featured Actress in a Musical | Stephanie J. Block | Nominated | |
| 2017 | Drama Desk Award | Outstanding Revival of a Musical | | Nominated | |
| 2017 | Drama Desk Award | Outstanding Featured Actor in a Musical | Brandon Uranowitz | Nominated | |
| 2017 | Drama Desk Award | Outstanding Featured Actress in a Musical | Stephanie J. Block | Nominated | |
| 2017 | Outer Critics Circle Award | Outstanding Actor in a Musical | Christian Borle | Nominated | |
| 2017 | Outer Critics Circle Award | Outstanding Featured Actor in a Musical | Andrew Rannells | Nominated | |
| 2017 | Outer Critics Circle Award | Outstanding Featured Actress in a Musical | Stephanie J. Block | Nominated | |
| 2017 | Drama League Award | Outstanding Revival of a Broadway or Off-Broadway Musical | | Nominated | |
| 2017 | Drama League Award | Distinguished Performance | Christian Borle | Nominated | |

=== 2019 Off-West End ===
| Year | Award | Category | Nominee | Result | Ref. |
|---|---|---|---|---|---|
| 2020 | Offie Award | Male Performance in a Musical | Daniel Boys | Nominated | |
| 2020 | Offie Award | Male Performance in a Supporting Role in a Musical | Oliver Savile | Finalist | |
