= Falsettoland =

Musical

- Original Cast Recording
- Music: William Finn
- Lyrics: William Finn
- Book: James Lapine
- Productions: 1990 Off-Broadway
- Awards: Lucille Lortel Award for Outstanding Musical; Drama Desk Award for Outstanding Lyrics

Falsettoland is a musical with a book by James Lapine, with music and lyrics by William Finn.

Following In Trousers and March of the Falsettos, it is the third in a trio of one-act musicals centering on Marvin, his wife Trina, his psychiatrist Mendel, his son Jason, and his gay lover Whizzer Brown. In this act, Jason is preparing for his bar mitzvah, while Whizzer is suffering from a life-threatening yet undefined illness, which the audience recognizes is AIDS. It forms the second act of the 1992 Broadway musical Falsettos, with March of the Falsettos as the first act.

== Productions ==
Falsettoland opened Off-Broadway at Playwrights Horizons on June 28, 1990, and closed on August 12, 1990.

The musical transferred to the Lucille Lortel Theatre on September 25, 1990, and closed on January 27, 1991, after 176 performances. Directed by Lapine, the cast included Michael Rupert (Marvin), Faith Prince (Trina), Stephen Bogardus (Whizzer), Chip Zien (later replaced by Lonny Price) (Mendel), Heather MacRae (Dr. Charlotte) Janet Metz (Cordelia), and Danny Gerard (Jason). .

A cast recording was released by DRG Records.

== Synopsis ==
The year is 1981. Mendel the psychiatrist shines a flashlight into the audience on a dark stage, welcoming them to "Falsettoland," the conclusion to March of the Falsettos. The cast has been enlarged by two, with Marvin's lesbian neighbors Dr. Charlotte, an internist, and Cordelia, a "shiksa" caterer as new additions. Marvin has realized that it's "About Time" that he grows up and gets over himself. He has called a truce with Trina, and he has managed to maintain his relationship with Jason, who is now preparing for his Bar Mitzvah. He has not seen his ex-boyfriend Whizzer for two years and has still not gotten over him.

One day, when she arrives to take custody of Jason for the week, Trina informs Marvin that it is now time to start planning Jason's Bar Mitzvah. The pair immediately starts bickering, to both Jason's dismay and Mendel's amusement. Mendel encourages them to have a simple party, but Trina (and Cordelia, the caterer) refuse. It is the "Year of the Child" after all, the year that every Jewish parent dreams of: the year their child is bar mitzvahed, and they can spend insane amounts of money celebrating.

The scene moves to Jason's Little League Baseball game. While at bat, Jason has a lot more on his mind than the game. He is trying to decide which girls to invite to his bar mitzvah: the girls he should invite, or the girls he "wants" to invite; reaching a discussion in this delicate situation would be a "Miracle of Judaism." Everyone is sitting "watching Jewish boys who can't play baseball" and getting a little too into it, when Whizzer suddenly arrives: Jason had asked him to come ("The Baseball Game"). Marvin is struck by how little he's aged, and a tentative offer of reconciliation is offered just as Jason miraculously hits the ball due to some batting advice from Whizzer. He's so shocked that he forgets to run.

Interlude: "A Day in Falsettoland”. In Part One, "Dr. Mendel at Work," Mendel listens to the blather of a yuppie patient and agonizes over being a 1960s shrink stuck in the 1980s, and how his work is taking a toll on his marriage to Trina. In Part Two, "Trina Works It Out," Trina reveals Marvin and Whizzer are back and wonders why that is bothering her. In Part Three, "The Neighbors Relax," Mendel and Trina jog and discuss Marvin and the bar mitzvah, and Dr. Charlotte comes home to Cordelia cooking "nouvelle bar mitzvah cuisine." Cordelia asks Charlotte how her day was at the hospital, and Charlotte exclaims that today was a "rare day without a death". Meanwhile, Marvin and Whizzer play racquetball and bicker when Whizzer beats Marvin soundly. All reflect on how wonderful life is.

The peace doesn't last long. Marvin and Trina are warring over every single aspect of the Bar Mitzvah, which makes Jason want to just call the whole thing off ("Round Tables, Square Tables"). It is up to Mendel to console the boy, telling him that "Everyone Hates His Parents" at his age, but everyone also gets past it and moves on to hate them less.

Marvin sits in bed one morning, looking at the sleeping Whizzer, wondering how much he loves him ("What More Can I Say?"). Dr. Charlotte, meanwhile, has started to become aware that "Something Bad is Happening" among young gay men in the city, who arrive at the hospital sick with a mysterious illness that no one seems to know anything about. Rumors spread as the disease begins to spread faster. Then, Whizzer collapses during a game of racquetball ("More Racquetball").

As Whizzer enters the hospital with a disease that the audience immediately knows to be AIDS, Trina begins to see her world fall apart around her as someone she shouldn't care about, but does anyway, is clearly sick. She is barely "Holding to the Ground" and this blow to her family may just be too hard to handle.

In Whizzer's hospital room, the entire cast gathers to cheer him up, everyone commenting on how good he looks. Marvin provides love, Cordelia chicken soup and Mendel some terrible jokes. Everyone agrees that it's "Days Like This" that make these secular Jews believe in God. Jason, in a moment of childish honesty, tells Whizzer that he looks awful.

Mendel and Trina sit Jason down and give Jason the option of "Canceling the Bar Mitzvah" if he feels he can't go through with it, and Jason is finally told that Whizzer may not recover. Marvin sits in Whizzer's hospital room, soon joined by the lesbians, and the four "Unlikely Lovers" wonder how much longer their love can last.

As Whizzer's condition worsens, Jason turns to God, asking him to let Whizzer get better ("Another Miracle of Judaism"); he'll even get bar mitzvahed if Whizzer gets better. But it's to no avail, because, as Dr. Charlotte reiterates, "Something Bad is Happening" to Whizzer ("Something Bad Is Happening (reprise)"). He is soon deathly ill, and he steels himself to meet his maker, reflecting bravely that "You Gotta Die Sometime."

Suddenly, everyone bursts into the hospital room. Jason has had an epiphany: he wants to hold his bar mitzvah in Whizzer's hospital room so he can be there ("Jason's Bar Mitzvah"). Trina couldn't be prouder, and everyone, for some reason, can only think how much Jason looks like Marvin. Jason is bar mitzvahed, entering adulthood as Whizzer begins to leave his, for Whizzer is taken out of the room as he can no longer bear to stay.

Marvin is left alone. He sits and reflects on his relationship with Whizzer ("What Would I Do?"). Whizzer appears, dressed as we first saw him. The two sing together one last time, and then Whizzer disappears. Marvin is comforted by his family, now short a member, as Mendel bids us goodnight from the crazy, sad world known as "Falsettoland."

== Musical numbers ==
- "Falsettoland" – Mendel & Company
- "About Time" – Marvin & Company
- "Year of the Child" – Marvin, Trina, Mendel, Jason, Charlotte, and Cordelia
- "Miracle of Judaism" – Jason
- "Watching Jason (Baseball)" – Company
- "A Day in Falsettoland" – Company
- "Racquetball" – Company
- "The Argument" – Mendel, Jason, Marvin, and Trina (Note: Renamed and reworked from "Round Tables, Square Tables".)
- "Everyone Hates His Parents" – Mendel, Jason, Marvin, and Trina
- "What More Can I Say" – Marvin
- "Something Bad is Happening" – Charlotte and Cordelia
- "Racquetball 2" – Marvin and Whizzer
- "Holding to the Ground" – Trina
- "Days Like This" – Company
- "Canceling the Bar Mitzvah" – Mendel, Trina, and Jason
- "Unlikely Lovers" – Marvin, Whizzer, Charlotte, and Cordelia
- "Another Miracle of Judaism" – Jason
- "You Gotta Die Sometime" – Whizzer
- "Jason's Bar Mitzvah" – Company
- "What Would I Do?" – Marvin, Whizzer

== Awards and nominations ==
The musical won the 1991 Lucille Lortel Award for Outstanding Musical; the 1991 Drama Desk Award for Outstanding Lyrics, (William Finn); and the 1991 Outer Critics Circle Award for Best Off-Broadway Musical.
