= March of the Falsettos =

Musical

- Icon
- Music: William Finn
- Lyrics: William Finn
- Book: William Finn
- Productions: 1981 Off-Broadway; 1982 Los Angeles; 1987 West End
- Awards: Outer Critics Circle Award for Best Off-Broadway Play

March of the Falsettos is a 1981 musical with book, lyrics, and music by William Finn. It is the second in a trilogy of musicals, preceded by In Trousers and followed by Falsettoland. March of the Falsettos and Falsettoland later formed the first and second act respectively of the 1992 musical Falsettos.

== Concept ==
A sequel to In Trousers, the one-act continues the story of Marvin and his journey in search of self-understanding, inner peace, and a life with a "happily ever after" ending. His extended family consists of ex-wife Trina, son Jason, lover Whizzer Brown, and psychiatrist Mendel, who complicates matters by becoming involved with Trina. The musical explores themes of family, Judaism, queerness, and love.

== Production ==
The musical premiered Off-Broadway at Playwrights Horizons on May 20, 1981 and closed on September 26, 1981. It transferred to the Westside Theatre on October 13, 1981 and closed on January 31, 1982 after 268 performances. The musical then opened in Los Angeles at the Huntington Hartford Theater on April 21, 1982 and closed on July 2, 1982. Directed by James Lapine, the cast included Michael Rupert (Marvin), Alison Fraser (Trina), James Kushner (Jason), Stephen Bogardus (Whizzer), and Chip Zien (Mendel). In the Los Angeles production, the role of Jason was played by Gregg E. Phillips, and the role of Trina was played by Melanie Chartoff.

An original cast recording of the musical was released by DRG Records.

The UK premiere of the show was at the intimate Library Theatre in Manchester, UK in 1987, directed by Roger Haines and Paul Kerryson. This production, featuring Barry James (Mendel), Martin Smith (Marvin), Paddy Navin (Trina), Simon Green (Whizzer) and Damien Walker (Jason), transferred to the West End's Albery Theatre for a limited run from 24th March 1987 to 18th April 1987.

Finn completed his Marvin trilogy with Falsettoland, which eventually became, with March of the Falsettos, the two-act Broadway musical Falsettos.

== Synopsis ==
It's 1979 in New York City. Marvin, his son Jason, his psychiatrist Mendel and his male lover Whizzer introduce themselves, along with Marvin's ex-wife, Trina ("Four Jews in a Room Bitching"). Marvin steps forward to explain his situation: he has left his wife, Trina, for Whizzer, but explains that he wants to and is attempting to forge a new family situation with the addition of Whizzer.

Trina, on Marvin's recommendation, pays a visit to Mendel, where she wearily wonders how her life has turned out this way. Mendel, who is instantly attracted to her, tries to console her ("Tight-Knit Family/Love is Blind"). Meanwhile, Marvin and Whizzer comment on their relationship: the two have very little in common, apart from the fact that they both love fighting and are insanely attracted to each other ("The Thrill of First Love").

The cast presents an interlude of Marvin at his psychiatry appointment with Mendel. In Part One, Mendel asks Marvin about his relationship with Whizzer and Marvin weighs the pros and cons of the relationship, ultimately concluding that he does love Whizzer. In Part Two, Mendel shifts the topic to Trina, and the session becomes one where Mendel, obviously aroused, interrogates Marvin about his ex-wife's bedroom habits. In Part Three, Marvin and Jason provide counterpoint on their strained relationship ("Marvin at the Psychiatrist, a Three-Part Mini-Opera").

Jason, who is 10, is very worried that, because his father is gay, he will turn out similarly. He begins to act up. His parents try to convince him to see Mendel for a therapy session and fail; however, Whizzer convinces him and he agrees to see Mendel ("My Father's a Homo/Everyone tells Jason to See a Psychiatrist").

Meanwhile, Marvin is trying to pigeon-hole Whizzer into the role of homemaker, and they fight. Trina complains to Mendel how her role in the family dynamic is being phased out as Whizzer becomes increasingly prominent in Marvin and Jason's lives. Marvin, being blamed for the family's strife by both Whizzer and Trina, continues to insist that all participants get along together as one extended family ("This Had Better Come To A Stop").

Jason is acting up again, and Trina phones Mendel frantically to come for dinner and therapy. Mendel arrives and immediately charms Trina. ("Please Come To My House") He and Jason settle down for a therapy session in which Jason frets about his future and his similarities to his father. Mendel encourages him to simply relax and enjoy life. After several such dinners and therapy sessions, Jason asks Mendel what his romantic intentions are towards Trina, and Mendel makes a marriage proposal to Trina, which she accepts ("A Marriage Proposal"). Marvin feels defensive over losing his family to his psychiatrist, and he and Mendel argue. ("Tight-Knit Family (Reprise)").

Trina reflects on her situation: she is tired of the man's world she lives in, and even though she knows that Mendel is the same kind of man Marvin is, slightly childish and neurotic, she recognizes he loves her, and she could do a lot worse. The four men of the show suddenly appear, singing a hymn to masculinity in all its aspects, the three adults singing in a falsetto to match Jason's unbroken voice. Once they exit, Trina returns, deciding to enjoy her life for what it is and be happy. ("Trina's Song/March of the Falsettos/Trina's Song (Reprise)")

Marvin tries to teach Whizzer to play chess. Whizzer convinces Marvin to let him win, which he agrees to, but bitterness and ill feelings boil over once he does, and the two break up ("The Chess Game"). Meanwhile, Trina and Mendel move in together and start their life as an engaged couple, feeling unsure of where they stand, while Whizzer is forced to leave his and Marvin's apartment ("Making A Home"). As he packs, Whizzer reflects on himself and his past relationships, and comes to the conclusion that he does not love Marvin ("The Games I Play").

Marvin receives Trina and Mendel's wedding invitation, sending him into a rage. Confronting Trina in front of Mendel and Jason, he accuses her of trying to ruin his life, before he impulsively slaps her ("Marvin Hits Trina"). Shocked by Marvin's outburst, the characters all reflect on the events leading up to it. ("I Never Wanted to Love You").

Although Marvin has broken up with Whizzer and ruined his relationship with Trina, he attempts salvage his relationship with Jason, who, to his immense relief, has just discovered women. Marvin sits Jason down, telling him that he loves him and no matter what kind of man Jason turns out to be, Marvin will always be there for him. ("Father to Son")

== Musical numbers ==
Source:Guide to Musical Theatre

- "Four Jews in a Room Bitching" – Whizzer, Marvin, Jason, Mendel, and Trina
- "A Tight-Knit Family" – Marvin
- "Love is Blind" – Marvin, Jason, Whizzer, Mendel, and Trina
- "The Thrill of First Love" – Marvin and Whizzer
- "Marvin at the Psychiatrist (A 3-Part Mini-Opera)" – Mendel, Marvin, Jason, and Whizzer
- "My Father's a Homo" – Jason
- "Everyone Tells Jason to See a Psychiatrist" – Jason, Marvin, Trina, and Whizzer
- "This Had Better Come to a Stop" – Marvin, Whizzer, Jason, Trina, and Mendel
- "I'm Breaking Down" – Trina (Note: Added for the Los Angeles run; the song was originally written originally for In Trousers.)
- "Please Come to My House" – Mendel, Trina, and Jason
- "Jason's Therapy" – Mendel, Trina, Whizzer, Marvin, and Jason
- "A Marriage Proposal" – Mendel
- "Trina's Song" – Trina
- "March of the Falsettos" – Mendel, Marvin, Jason, and Whizzer
- "Trina's Song (Reprise)" – Trina
- "The Chess Game" – Marvin and Whizzer
- "Making a Home" – Mendel, Jason, Trina, and Whizzer
- "The Games I Play" – Whizzer
- "Marvin Hits Trina" – Marvin, Mendel, Jason, Trina, and Whizzer
- "I Never Wanted to Love You" – Marvin, Mendel, Jason, Trina, and Whizzer
- "Father to Son" – Marvin and Jason

== Critical reception ==
Frank Rich, in his review for The New York Times, wrote: "The songs are so fresh that the show is only a few bars old before one feels the unmistakable, revivifying charge of pure talent....However slight and predictable the raw materials, Mr. Finn has transformed them into a show that is funny and tender on its own contained, anecdotal terms."

== Awards and nominations ==
The play won the 1981 Outer Critics Circle Award for Best Off-Broadway Play.
