= Stephen Bogardus =

American actor

- Born: March 11, 1954 (age 72); Norfolk, Virginia, U.S.
- Education: Princeton University
- Occupation: Actor
- Years active: 1980–present
- Spouse: Dana Moore
- Children: 1

Stephen Bogardus (born March 11, 1954) is an American actor. He originated the role of Whizzer in the Broadway musical, Falsettos.

== Biography ==
Born in Norfolk, Virginia, Bogardus graduated from Choate Rosemary Hall in 1972 and Princeton University in 1976, where he was a member of the Princeton Nassoons and the Princeton Triangle Club.

=== Career ===
Bogardus studied acting at HB Studio. His first role was as one of the Sheriff's men in a local production of Robin Hood on MacArthur Drive in Greenwich, Connecticut.

He made his first New York City appearance in a stage adaptation of the film The Umbrellas of Cherbourg at Joseph Papp's Public Theater in 1979. His additional off-Broadway credits include March of the Falsettos (1981), In Trousers (1985), Falsettoland (1990), and Love! Valour! Compassion! (1994), which transferred to Broadway the following year, and Man of La Mancha (2002). He received both Obie and Tony Award nominations for his performance in Love! Valour! Compassion!, and reprised his role in the 1997 film. He was featured in the City Center concert series Encores! in Sweet Adeline (1997) and Allegro as Joseph Taylor Jr. (1994).

His Broadway work includes West Side Story (1980) as understudy Tony, Les Misérables (November 1987 - June 1988) as Grantaire and understudy Javert, in addition to other roles, Safe Sex (1987), The Grapes of Wrath, Falsettos (1992) as Whizzer, King David (Concert, 1997), High Society (1998), James Joyce's The Dead (April 4, 2000 to April 16, 2000, as Gabriel Conroy), Man of La Mancha (2002, Dr. Carrasco), and Old Acquaintance (2007).

In 1990, he toured the United States as the American chess player Freddie Trumper in Tim Rice's Chess. A year later, he portrayed Stine in the tour of City of Angels.

In 1996, Bogardus played Peter van Pels in the song cycle I Am Anne Frank in the New York premiere at Alice Tully Hall.

In 2008, he starred as Bob Wallace in the Broadway and U.S. touring productions of White Christmas, a role he had performed in 2005 at the Wang Center in Boston and in 2006 in St. Paul.

In 2013, he portrayed Colonel Ricci in an Off-Broadway production of Passion. In 2014-2016, Bogardus originated and appeared on Broadway in the role of Daddy Cane in Steve Martin and Edie Brickell's Bright Star. In the late 2010s, he performed on various Off-Broadway productions portraying Joe Boyd in Damn Yankees in 2017 and Nick Laine in Girl from the North Country in 2018.

In regional theatre, Bogardus appeared in M. Butterfly at the Arena Stage, Washington, D.C.; William Finn's, Elegies, Canon Theatre, Los Angeles; and James Joyce's The Dead at the Ahmanson Theater, Los Angeles and the Kennedy Center, Washington, D.C.

Bogardus' extensive television credits include small roles on the daytime soaps Another World, All My Children and Guiding Light; and numerous guest appearances on prime time series, including Cagney and Lacey, Law & Order, Law & Order: Special Victims Unit, Law & Order: Criminal Intent, Ed, Monk and Conviction.

In June 2020 he unsuccessfully ran for the presidency of the labor union Actors' Equity Association, challenging incumbent Kate Shindle.

== Personal ==
Bogardus is married to dancer Dana Moore. In 1998, they appeared opposite each other in Chicago, with Bogardus as lawyer Billy Flynn and Moore as Velma Kelly. In 2002, they appeared together in Damn Yankees as Lola and Mr. Applegate at the Boston Center for The Arts, Boston, Massachusetts. They have an adopted son, Jackson Bogardus.

== Broadway credits ==
- West Side Story (1980) as Mouth Piece and understudy Tony
- Les Misérables (1987) as Grantaire/Bamatabois/Ensemble and understudy Javert
- The Grapes of Wrath (1990) as Car Salesman/Bookkeeper
- Falsettos (1992) as Whizzer
- King David (1997) as Joab
- Love! Valour! Compassion! (1998) as Gregory Mitchell
- High Society (1998) as Mike Connor
- James Joyce's The Dead (2000) as Gabriel Conroy
- Man of La Mancha (2002 revival) as Duke/Dr. Carrasco
- Old Acquaintance (2007) as Preston Drake
- White Christmas (2008) as Bob Wallace
- Bright Star (2016) as Daddy Cane
- Damn Yankees (2017) as Joe Boyd

== Awards and nominations ==
Year	Award	Category	Work	Result
1995	Tony Award	Best Featured Actor in a Play	Love! Valour! Compassion!	Nominated
2013	Drama Desk Award	Outstanding Featured Actor in a Musical	Passion	Nominated
