= Alison Fraser =

American actress and singer

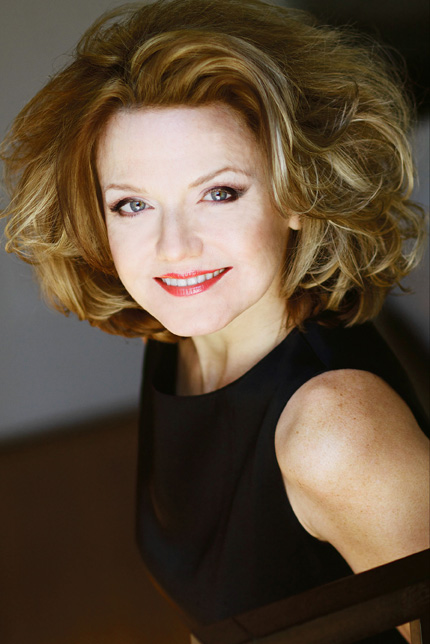
- Born: Natick, Massachusetts, U.S.
- Occupations: Singer, voice actress, actress
- Years active: 1980–present
- Spouse: Rusty Magee (m. 1984; died 2003)
- Children: 1
- Website: www.alisonfraser.com

Alison Fraser is an American actress, voice actress and singer who has appeared on Broadway, Off-Broadway, and in television and film. In concert, she has performed at such venues as Carnegie Hall, The White House, Town Hall, The Brooklyn Botanic Garden, The Tisch Center for the Arts, The Folger Shakespeare Library, The Wilma, The Emelin, Joe's Pub, 54 Below, and Symphony Space.

== Career ==
Fraser is a two-time Tony Award nominee for The Secret Garden and Romance/Romance, a Drama Desk Award nominee for both The Secret Garden, and First Daughter Suite and a Carbonell Award winner for Romance/Romance. Fraser is a Callaway Award-winner for Heartbreak House.

She played "Tessie Tura" in the New York City Center and Broadway productions of Gypsy starring Patti LuPone under the direction of Arthur Laurents.

She was the first ever recipient of Philadelphia's Barrymore Award for Best Actress for her portrayal of "The Blonde" in Marion Adler, Scott Wentworth and Craig Boehmler's film noir musical, Gunmetal Blues under the direction of Jiri Zizka. She reprised the role of "The Blonde" in Gunmetal Blues opposite Patrick Quinn at the George Street Playhouse. She returned there to play "Diana" in Lend Me a Tenor, directed by David Saint.

She was the original "Trina" (Marvin's ex-wife) in William Finn's March of the Falsettos and In Trousers (Playwrights Horizons). She also did vocal orchestrations for both shows. She played "Miss Drumgoole" in Todd Rundgren's adaptation of Joe Orton's Up Against It (New York Shakespeare Festival), "Uta" in Charles Busch and Rusty Magee's The Green Heart (Manhattan Theatre Club), "Connie"/"Petula"/"Brenda" in Beehive at the Village Gate, and "Marion Ames" in Swingtime Canteen. In 1986, she made her Broadway debut in The Mystery of Edwin Drood (musical) as Helena Landless, replacing Jana Schneider. In 1988, she appeared on Broadway in Romance/Romance, a musical starring herself and Quantum Leap star, Scott Bakula. For her dual-role as Josefine/Monica, Fraser received her first Tony Award Nomination. In 1991, Fraser appeared in The Secret Garden, a musical based on the children's story by Frances Hodgson Burnett. For originating the role of Martha, Fraser earned a second Tony Award Nomination. The Secret Garden also featured Mandy Patinkin, Daisy Eagan, John Cameron Mitchell and Rebecca Luker. Fraser stars in the one-woman show A Tennessee Williams Songbook conceived and directed by David Kaplan with musical direction by Allison Leyton-Brown. The show premiered at The Tennessee Williams Festival in Williams' birthplace of Columbus, Mississippi and went on to great acclaim at the annual Provincetown Tennessee Williams Festival. An original cast album titled Tennessee Williams: Words and Music was released on Sh-K-Boom Records in 2013.

Fraser portrayed the flamboyant but clueless "Babs Caplan" on the award-winning PBS series, Between the Lions. She has appeared on the TV series Gotham, High Maintenance, Smash, Law and Order: Special Victims Unit, Happy!, and Third Watch. She played the recurring roles of "Aunt Heidi" in the award-winning web-series Jack in a Box, written and produced by Michael Cyril Creighton, and "Veronica Bailey" on Wesley Taylor and Mitchell Jarvis’s It Could Be Worse (the latter web series was broadcast on Pivot and was later picked up by Hulu).

Her feature films include Socks and Bonds, Family Games, Blowtorch, Commentary, Jack and His Friends (with Sam Rockwell), Me and Him, Mixing Nia, In the Blood, The Mice War, Tommy Battles the Silver Sea Dragon, The Thing About My Folks, and Landscape with Invisible Hand. She can also be seen in the Bright Eyes music video for their song, First Day of My Life, directed by her Secret Garden co-star, John Cameron Mitchell. She authored an interview with Anthony Newley which was published in Time Out. Fraser also appeared in video games Grand Theft Auto IV, Grand Theft Auto V, Grand Theft Auto VI, and Mafia III.

She has made three solo albums, A New York Romance, Men in My Life and Tennessee Williams: Words and Music.

In 2004, Fraser sang the national anthem at Fenway Park.

In 2009, Arthur Laurents cast Fraser in an original play, Come Back, Come Back, Wherever You Are which premiered at the George Street Playhouse. The play was directed by Laurents himself and featured Tony-winning actress, Shirley Knight. Also with Knight, Fraser appeared in the 2012 world premiere of Tennessee Williams' final full-length play In Masks Outrageous and Austere.

In 2010, playwright and performer Charles Busch cast Fraser in his new comedy, The Divine Sister, a play satirizes the cinematic portrayal of nuns. Fraser played Sister Walburga. Fraser then originated the role of Arsinoe in David Ives' comedy The School For Lies at Classic Stage Company.

On December 16, 2013, Fraser joined the First National Tour of Wicked in the role of Madame Morrible.

In 2015, Fraser appeared in four episodes of the Showtime television series Happyish as both Ma Keebler and Boots.

From October 6 to November 22, 2015, Fraser performed in the world premiere of Michael John LaChiusa's musical First Daughter Suite at the Public Theater, in the roles of Nancy Reagan and Betty Ford. For her performance, Fraser received nominations for both the Lucille Lortel Award and Drama Desk Award for Outstanding Featured Actress in a Musical.

In the fall of 2017, Fraser performed a limited run of playwright Aaron Mark's new play Squeamish. The one woman show was presented by All For One Theater (AFO) at Theatre Row's Beckett Theatre. Squeamish ran October 6 – November 11, 2017. For Squeamish, Fraser received a 2018 Outer Critics Circle nomination for Outstanding Solo Performance.

In April 2021, AudioFile named Fraser a recipient of its Earphones Award for her audiobook narration of Alexander Nemerov's novel, Fierce Pose.

In 2023, the Off-Broadway Alliance honored Fraser with its "Legend of Off-Broadway" award.

== Personal life ==
Fraser was born in Natick, Massachusetts, on July 8, 1955, and in 1973 graduated from Natick High School, where she played Helen Keller in The Miracle Worker and met William Finn, future composer of March of the Falsettos. She studied briefly at Carnegie Mellon before leaving for New York.

Fraser was married to composer and performer Benjamin Rush "Rusty" Magee from 1984 until his death in 2003. Their one son, Nathaniel Fraser Magee, is an editor in New York City.

She received her bachelor's degree summa cum laude from Fordham University in 2010. She has taught in Fordham's theater department.

== Theatre credits ==
- In Trousers
- March of the Falsettos
- Falsettos
- Lady in the Dark
- Lips Together, Teeth Apart
- Lend Me a Tenor
- Tartuffe
- The Mystery of Edwin Drood
- Secret Garden
- Up Against It
- The Green Heart
- Beehive
- Honk!
- Prodigal
- Lizzie Borden
- Dedication or The Stuff of Dreams
- High School Musical
- A Quarrel of Sparrows
- Gypsy
- Wicked
- Come Back, Come Back, Wherever You Are
- The Divine Sister
- Archy and Mehitabel
- Love, Loss, and What I Wore
- The School For Lies
- A Charity Case
- In Masks Outrageous and Austere
- Love Therapy
- First Daughter Suite
- The Sandbox
- Funnyhouse of a Negro
- Squeamish
- the shards of an honor code junkie
- A Blanket Of Dust
- Heartbreak House
- Steel Magnolias
- Enter Laughing
- Cinderella
- Deathtrap
- Paradise Lost
- Romance/Romance
- Cat on a Hot Tin Roof
- The Drowsy Chaperone
- Driving Miss Daisy

== Filmography ==
=== Film ===
- 1988: Me and Him
- 1992: Jack and His Friends
- 1997: The Amazing Feats of Young Hercules (voice)
- 1998: Mixing Nia
- 2003: The Thing About My Folks
- 2006: In The Blood
- 2006: Spectropia
- 2012: Commentary
- 2014: Socks and Bonds
- 2016: Blowtorch
- 2017: The Mice War (voice)
- 2017: Family Games
- 2017: Hard
- 2018: Tommy Battles the Silver Sea Dragon
- 2019: The Sound of Silence
- 2019: Impossible Monsters
- 2019: In The Campfire Light
- 2020: It Cuts Deep
- 2023: Landscape with Invisible Hand

=== Television ===
- 1995: Ace Ventura: Pet Detective (voice)
- 2000–2001: Between the Lions – Babs Caplan
- 2001: Spy Groove – Mimi LeVerne, Kathy Lee Gifford (voices) (2 episodes)
- 2003: Law & Order: Special Victims Unit
- 2003: Third Watch
- 2015: Happyish – Boots, Ma Keebler (voices) (2 episodes)
- 2016: High Maintenance
- 2017: Happy! – Mrs. Claws
- 2018: Gotham – Gertrude Haverstock (Episode: "That's Entertainment")
- 2023: Blue Bloods – Bobbi Gallo

=== Videogame ===
- 2008: Grand Theft Auto IV – Gertrude Leneau, The Crowd of Liberty City
- 2013: Grand Theft Auto V – Additional Voices
- 2016: Mafia III – Additional Voices
