= Michael Rupert =

American actor, singer, director and composer (born 1951)

- Born: Michael John Rupert; October 23, 1951 (age 74); Denver, Colorado USA
- Occupations: Actor, singer, composer, director
- Years active: 1968–present
- Spouse: Will Chafin-Rupert
- Awards: 1986 Best Featured Actor in a Musical

Michael John Rupert (born October 23, 1951, Denver, Colorado) is an American actor, singer, director and composer. In 1968, he made his Broadway debut in The Happy Time as Bibi Bonnard for which he received a Tony Award nomination and the Theater World Award. Later, he starred as the title role in Pippin for three years on Broadway starting in 1974. He originated the role of Marvin in the William Finn musicals March of the Falsettos, Falsettoland and Falsettos. In 2007, he originated the role of Professor Callahan in the Broadway cast of Legally Blonde. Rupert has been the nominee and recipient of several Tony and Drama Desk awards, including for his performance in Sweet Charity in 1986.

== Early life ==
At 16 years old, Rupert made his Broadway debut in 1968 in Kander and Ebb's The Happy Time as the young Bibi Bonnard. His performance earned him the 1968 Theater World Award and his first Tony Award nomination for Featured Actor in a Musical. At the 22nd Tony Awards, Rupert performed "The Happy Time" and "A Certain Girl" from The Happy Time alongside his castmates Robert Goulet and David Wayne. He returned to California after The Happy Time, and appeared in local theater while in high school. During this time he appeared in the Disney film The Computer Wore Tennis Shoes and as Gery in the 1975 film adaptation of A Boy and His Dog.

== Career ==
=== Acting ===
Rupert returned to Broadway in 1974 as a replacement in the role of Pippin. In 1981, he appeared on Broadway in Shakespeare's Cabaret. He then originated the role of Marvin in two William Finn musicals, March of the Falsettos (1981) at the Off-Broadway Playwrights Horizons and Falsettoland (1990), which began at Playwrights Horizons before moving to the Lucille Lortel Theater. When March of the Falsettos and Falsettoland were performed together under the name Falsettos in 1992, Rupert once again played the role of Marvin, for which he received a nomination for the 1992 Tony Award for Best Actor in a Musical. In 1986 he appeared as Oscar in the Broadway revival of Sweet Charity, for which he won the 1986 Tony Award for Best Performance by a Featured Actor in a Musical. In the 1988 musical Mail, Rupert not only originated the role of Alex, but composed the music as well. He was a replacement in the role of Stine in City of Angels in 1989 and was in Ragtime as a replacement Tateh in 1999.

In 2003, he performed with Betty Buckley, Christian Borle, Carolee Carmello and Keith Bryon Kirk in the Lincoln Center staging of William Finn's Elegies: A Song Cycle. He originated the role of Professor Callahan in Legally Blonde (2007) on Broadway and returned to the role on the National tour, starting in February 2010. Rupert appeared as Kenneth Sharpe in the play 7th Monarch Off-Broadway at the Acorn Theater, opening in June 2012. He appeared in the Broadway revival of On the Town as Judge Pitkin, which ran from October 2014 to September 2015.

In regional theatre, he starred as Norbert in a workshop production of The Happy Elf, composed by Harry Connick, Jr. at Montgomery College's Robert E. Parilla Performing Arts Center, Rockville, Maryland in a co-production with Adventure Theatre, Washington, DC in November 2010.

His television credits include guest roles on series such as My Three Sons, The Waltons, Marcus Welby, M.D. and its legal spin-off Owen Marshall: Counselor at Law, Another World, Emergency!, Cannon, Alice, The Partridge Family, Alias Smith and Jones, Hawkins, Cheers, Law & Order and New York Undercover. Also he was in the MTV broadcast of Legally Blonde in 2007.

=== Directing ===
In 1997, Rupert directed an Off-Broadway production of The Lunch Anxieties by Larry Kunofsky at the Harold Clurman Theatre. He directed J. Arlington Meyrelles III's musical, The Stars In Your Eyes, in an Equity workshop production in 1998. Rupert directed Thrill Me: Leopold & Loeb Story (2005) at the York Theatre.

=== Composing ===
Rupert composed the music, with book and lyrics by Jerry Colker, to the 1985 Off-Broadway music 3 Guys Naked from the Waist Down, which won the Drama Desk Award for Outstanding Book and was nominated for Outstanding Music. The score for Mail (1988) was also written by Rupert with Colker once again writing the book and lyrics. Rupert wrote the score to Strange Vacation (1998) and collaborated with Allan Heinberg. He composed the score and co-wrote the book and lyrics with Matthew Riopelle for the musical Streets of America (2007). On August 18, 2008 the number "Racing to the Moon" was released Footlight Label as a single featuring three different performances: one by Rupert, which would be his debut single, another by actor Sebastian Arcelus, and an instrumental version by the guitarist David Timmons.

== Personal life ==
Rupert lives in New York City with his life partner, Will Chafin.

== Theater Credits ==
Year	Production	Role	Notes
1968	The Happy Time	Bibi Bonnar	Original Broadway Cast
1974-1977	Pippin	Pippin	Broadway Replacement
1977-1978	Pippin	Pippin	US tour
1979	Festival	Troubador	Off-Broadway
1979	Damn Yankees	Joe Hardy	Hartford Stage
1981-1982	March of the Falsettos	Marvin	Original Cast
1986-1987	Sweet Charity	Oscar	Broadway revival
1988	Mail	Alex	
1989	City of Angels	Stine	Broadway replacement
1990	Falsettoland	Marvin	Original Cast
1992-1993	Falsettos	Marvin	Original Broadway Cast
1994	Falsettos	Marvin	US tour replacement
1998	Ragtime	Tateh	US tour
1999-2000	Ragtime	Tateh	Broadway replacement
2001	A New Brain	Gordon Michael Schwinn	Studio Theatre
2003	Falsettos	Marvin	Playwrights Horizons
2003	Elegies: A Song Cycle	Original Performer	
2003	Falsettos	Marvin	Skirball Cultural Center
2004	Ragtime	Tateh	North Carolina Theatre
2007-2008	Legally Blonde	Professor Callahan	Original Broadway Cast
2009	The Full Monty	Harold Nichols	Paper Mill Playhouse
2010	Legally Blonde	Professor Callahan	US tour replacement
2011	Legally Blonde	Professor Callahan	Ogunquit Playhouse
2012	7th Monarch	Kenneth Sharpe	
2013	On The Town	Judge Pitkin Bridgework	Barrington Stage Company
2014-2015	On The Town	Judge Pitkin Bridgework	Broadway revival
2017	Sweet Charity	Director	Point Park University

== Awards and nominations ==
Year	Award	Category	Work	Result
1968	Tony Award	Best Featured Actor in a Musical	The Happy Time	Nominated
1968	Theater World Award	Theater World Award	The Happy Time	Won
1985	Drama Desk Award	Outstanding Music	3 Guys Naked From the Waist Down	Nominated
1986	Tony Award	Best Featured Actor in a Musical	Sweet Charity	Won
1986	Drama Desk Award	Outstanding Featured Actor in a Musical	Sweet Charity	Won
1992	Tony Award	Best Actor in a Musical	Falsettos	Nominated

== See also ==
- LGBT culture in New York City
- List of LGBT people from New York City
- NYC Pride March
