= William Finn =

American composer and lyricist (1952–2025)

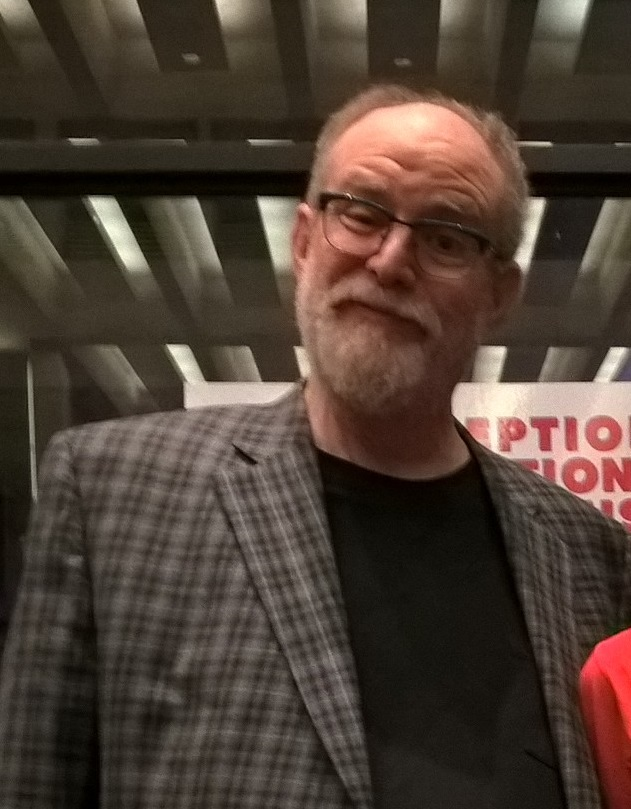
- Finn in 2016

Background information
- Born: February 28, 1952; Boston, Massachusetts, U.S.
- Died: April 7, 2025 (aged 73) Bennington, Vermont, U.S.
- Genres: Musical theater
- Occupations: Composer; lyricist
- Years active: 1971–2018

William Alan Finn (February 28, 1952 – April 7, 2025) was an American composer and lyricist. He was best known for his musicals, which include Falsettos, for which he won the 1992 Tony Awards for Best Original Score and Best Book of a Musical, A New Brain (1998), and The 25th Annual Putnam County Spelling Bee (2005).

== Early life ==
Finn was born in Boston, Massachusetts, on February 28, 1952. He was Jewish, raised in conservative Judaism, and grew up in Natick, Massachusetts, with his parents and siblings, Michael and Nancy. He attended the Temple Israel in Natick, where his rabbi was Harold Kushner. In Hebrew school, Finn wrote his first play, and said, "I don't think I ever told anyone this: The first play I ever wrote was in Hebrew. I have no idea what it was about. But it was horrible, I guarantee it. I couldn't write plays, and I couldn't really speak Hebrew, so how good could it be?" While attending Natick High School, Finn competed with the Natick Speech Team and was in the drama department headed by Gerald Dyer. For his bar mitzvah, he received a guitar and taught himself to play.

He went on to attend Williams College in Williamstown, Massachusetts, as a music major. He originally entered as a guitar major, "When I got to college I kind of transferred to the piano. I transferred what I knew on the guitar to the piano. But when I was playing the guitar I was always writing my own songs — and singing a few of — I only had one book of folk songs, a blue book, of these sad, sad folk songs. ...I would start them the way they were written and then I would change them to how I wanted them.... I would just use the lyrics — re-musicalize the lyrics." When he graduated, he received the Hutchinson Fellowship (a musical composition award).

== Career ==
Finn was a heavily autobiographical writer; he always wrote his own lyrics. His topics included the gay and Jewish experiences in contemporary America, and also family, belonging, sickness, healing, and loss. According to a 2006 article, "The Washington Post called him 'the composer laureate of loss.'"

Finn was especially noted for his work on what was to become a trilogy of short musicals Off-Broadway. In Trousers, March of the Falsettos, and Falsettoland. All of them chronicle the lives of the character Marvin, his ex-wife Trina, his boyfriend Whizzer, his psychiatrist Mendel, and his son Jason. Falsettos, the combination of the latter two parts of his Marvin Trilogy (March of the Falsettos and Falsettoland), opened on Broadway at the John Golden Theater on April 29, 1992, and ran for 486 performances. It went on to garner seven nominations at the 46th Tony Awards, winning two: the 1992 Tony Award for Best Original Score as well as the 1992 Tony Award for Best Book of a Musical, the latter Finn shared with James Lapine.

A critically acclaimed revival opened on September 29, 2016, at the Walter Kerr Theater and went on to garner five nominations at the 71st Tony Awards, including Best Revival.

With Lapine, Finn penned a musical loosely based on his near-death experience following brain surgery, exploring the role of music in his life and recovery. The musical's main character is a man who has what may be a terminal arteriovenous malformation (AVM). Finn's longtime partner, Arthur Salvadore, is represented by the character Roger Delli-Bovi. Finn's mother is also present in the piece. That musical, A New Brain, starred Malcolm Gets, Kristin Chenoweth and Chip Zien, and premiered at the then Off-Broadway venue, the Lincoln Center Theater in 1998. The musical won the 1999 Outer Critics Circle Award for Outstanding Off-Broadway Musical. The UK premiere was at the 2005 Edinburgh Festival Fringe.

At the 2006 Elliot Norton Awards Ceremony, Finn brought his high school drama teacher, Gerry Dyer, onstage with him to present an award. Finn said of Dyer that he "imbued us with a ridiculous sense of our own self-worth." Another student of Gerald Dyer, Alison Fraser, found fame on Broadway, collaborating with Finn in the original casts of In Trousers and March of the Falsettos.

Finn had another Broadway success with The 25th Annual Putnam County Spelling Bee, for which he wrote both music and lyrics. The show won two Tony Awards in 2005-one for Best Book of a Musical, and another for the Best Performance by a Featured Actor in a Musical. It ran Off-Broadway, then on Broadway in 2005 and toured the United States in 2006. The show was first workshopped and produced at Barrington Stage Company (BSC) in Pittsfield, Massachusetts, where Finn later created The Musical Theatre Lab (MTL) with BSC Artistic Director Julianne Boyd. The MTL is an annual summer lab where emerging musical theatre artists are supported and new musical works are created, originally fine-tuned and produced under the curatorship of Finn and Boyd.

Three musical revues or song suites of Finn's music have been produced:

- Infinite Joy, in which the composer played the piano and sang along with an all-star cast, contained several songs from shows that were unfinished, and some that were cut from previous shows.
- Elegies: A Song Cycle (2003) is a series of songs the composer wrote in memoriam of loved ones now gone, and in response to the September 11, 2001 attacks.
- Make Me a Song, conceived and directed by Rob Ruggiero, premiered at Hartford's Theaterworks in the summer of 2006, opened Off-Broadway in November 2007, and closed in December 2007 after 54 performances. A live recording was released by Sh-K-Boom Records on April 29, 2008.

Finn's first show was called Sizzle and was produced at Williams College in the fall of 1971. Finn wrote the music and lyrics, and his good friend, Charlie Rubin, wrote the libretto. Sizzle was the first original musical produced on the Williams College campus since Stephen Sondheim attended the college over 20 years earlier. Sizzle was a coming of age musical about college students but concluded in an unusual way with the star of the show, played by J. Tyler Griffin, Jr., dying in an electric chair. Sizzle played to packed houses. Rubin possesses a reel-to-reel tape containing excerpts from the show, including most of the music.

Finn's songs were featured exclusively on Lisa Howard's album Songs of Innocence and Experience, released on April 12, 2011.

The musical comedy Little Miss Sunshine, premiered at the La Jolla Playhouse, California, from February 15, 2011, through March 27, 2011. James Lapine wrote the book and was the director, set design by David Korins, staging by Lapine and Christopher Gattelli. The opening night cast featured Hunter Foster (Richard), Malcolm Gets (Frank), Dick Latessa (Grandpa), Taylor Trensch (Dwayne), Georgi James (Olive), and Jennifer Laura Thompson (Sheryl). The ensemble, who Jay Irwin wrote "...took the small parts they were given and ran with them, almost right out of the theater as each of them brilliantly played the comedic relief to the family's "straight man"", starred Bradley Dean, Carmen Ruby Floyd, Eliseo Roman, Andrew Samonsky, Sally Wilfert, and Zakiya Young.

Little Miss Sunshine began previews Off Broadway at the Second Stage Theatre in New York on October 15, 2013, and opened November 14, 2013.

Finn's frequent collaborators included librettist James Lapine, director Graciela Daniele and singers/actors Stephen Bogardus, Carolee Carmello, Stephen DeRosa, Alison Fraser, Keith Byron Kirk, Norm Lewis, Michael Rupert, Mary Testa, Christian Borle, and Chip Zien.

Finn was one of a selected few composers who contributed to the song cycle Stars of David which premiered in October 2012 at the Philadelphia Theatre Company. It is based on the Abigail Pogrebin's book Stars of David: Prominent Jews Talk About Being Jewish and starred Nancy Balbirer, Alex Brightman, Joanna Glushak, Brad Oscar, and Donna Vivino. Finn also contributed to the Off-Broadway musical Mama & her Boys.

His long-in-development show, The Royal Family of Broadway, with a book by Richard Greenberg, is based on the play by George S. Kaufman and Edna Ferber, which tells the story of a girl from a family of great Broadway actors who contemplates leaving show business and getting married. It apparently had been shelved according to Finn's personal notes for Make Me a Song, Playbill magazine and an article from 2006. Notwithstanding, it saw its first full production in 2018 at the Barrington Stage Company with Putnam librettist Rachel Sheinkin penning the book.

== Personal life and death ==
Finn was gay, and lived with his life partner, Arthur Salvadore, in New York City and Pittsfield, Massachusetts.

Finn was a member of the NYU Tisch Graduate Program in Musical Theater Writing faculty. He was the co-founder and artistic producer of the Musical Theatre Lab at the Barrington Stage Company in Pittsfield, Massachusetts, established in 2006.

=== Illness and death ===
In 1992, Finn suffered deteriorating vision, dizziness and partial paralysis and was rushed to the hospital. He had arteriovenous malformation, or AVM, in his brain stem. In September 1992, he had Gamma Knife surgery, which obliterated the AVM. After the surgery, Finn experienced a year of humble serenity and constantly felt like he had a "new brain." Finn's 1998 musical A New Brain is based on his experience with AVM and his subsequent successful surgery.

Finn died from pulmonary fibrosis at a hospital in Bennington, Vermont, on April 7, 2025, at the age of 73.

== Writing credits ==
=== Stage ===
- In Trousers (1979, revised 1985) – Off-Broadway musical – composer, lyricist, writer
- March of the Falsettos (1981) – Off-Broadway musical – composer, lyricist, writer
- America Kicks Up Its Heels (1983) – Off-Broadway musical – composer, lyricist (book by Charles Rubin) – an earlier version of Romance in Hard Times
- Dangerous Games (1989) – Broadway musical – lyricist (music by Ástor Piazzolla, book by Graciela Daniele and Jim Lewis)
- Romance in Hard Times (1989, revised 2015) – Off-Broadway musical – composer, lyricist, writer
- Falsettoland (1990) – Off-Broadway musical – composer, lyricist, book by James Lapine
- Falsettos (1992) – Broadway musical – composer, lyricist, co-writer with James Lapine; includes March of the Falsettos and Falsettoland
- The Sisters Rosensweig (1993) – Broadway play – composer and lyricist for the song "Scarlet Pimpernel"
- A New Brain (1998) – Off-Broadway musical – composer, lyricist, co-writer with James Lapine
- Love's Fire (1998) – playwright, composer and lyricist for the song "Painting You"
- Muscle (2001) – O'Rourke Center for the Performing Arts, Truman College – composer (lyrics by Ellen Fitzhugh, book by James Lapine)
- Elegies: A Song Cycle (2003) – Off-Broadway revue – composer, lyricist
- The 25th Annual Putnam County Spelling Bee (2004) – Off-Broadway musical transferred to Broadway (2005) – composer, lyricist (book by Rachel Sheinkin)
- Make Me a Song (2007) – Off-Broadway revue – composer, lyricist
- Little Miss Sunshine (2011) – La Jolla Playhouse musical and then Off-Broadway, Second Stage Theatre, (2013) – composer, lyricist (books by James Lapine)
- The Royal Family of Broadway (2018) – Barrington Stage Company (new book by Rachel Sheinkin, original book by James Lapine)

=== Film ===
- The Brave Little Toaster to the Rescue (1997) – songs (lyrics by Ellen Fitzhugh, score by Alexander Janko)
- The Brave Little Toaster Goes to Mars (1998) – songs (lyrics by Ellen Fitzhugh, score by Alexander Janko)
- The Adventures of Tom Thumb and Thumbelina (2002) – composer, lyricist

=== Television ===
- "Ira Sleeps Over" (1991) – TV special, part of the series HBO Storybook Musicals – composer, lyricist
- Pokey Little Puppy's First Christmas (1992) – composer, lyricist
- The Emperor's Newest Clothes (2018) – HBO – composer, lyricist

=== Notable Songs ===
- "Anytime (I Am There)"
- "The Baseball Game"
- "Change"
- "Four Jews in a Room Bitching"
- "Goodbye / Boom Boom"
- "Gordo's Law of Genetics"
- "Heart and Music"
- "Holding to the Ground"
- "How Marvin Eats His Breakfast"
- "I'd Rather Be Sailing"
- "I Have Found"
- "The I Love You Song"
- "Infinite Joy"
- "Just Go"
- "Monica and Mark"
- "The Music Still Plays On"
- "Republicans"
- "Set Those Sails"
- "Song of Innocence and Experience"
- "Unlikely Lovers"
- "What More Can I Say?"
- "What Would I Do?"
- "When the Earth Stopped Turning"
- "Whizzer Going Down"

== Awards and nominations ==
| Year | Association | Category | Nominated work | Result |
|---|---|---|---|---|
| 1991 | Drama Desk Award | Outstanding Music | Falsettoland | Won |
| 1991 | Drama Desk Award | Outstanding Lyrics | Falsettoland | Won |
| 1992 | Tony Award | Best Book of a Musical | Falsettos | Won |
| 1992 | Tony Award | Best Original Score | Falsettos | Won |
| 1999 | Drama Desk Award | Outstanding New Musical | A New Brain | Nominated |
| 1999 | Drama Desk Award | Outstanding Book of a Musical | A New Brain | Nominated |
| 1999 | Drama Desk Award | Outstanding Music | A New Brain | Nominated |
| 1999 | Drama Desk Award | Outstanding Lyrics | A New Brain | Nominated |
| 2005 | Tony Award | Best Original Score | The 25th Annual Putnam County Spelling Bee | Nominated |
| 2005 | Drama Desk Award | Outstanding Music | The 25th Annual Putnam County Spelling Bee | Nominated |
| 2005 | Drama Desk Award | Outstanding Lyrics | The 25th Annual Putnam County Spelling Bee | Nominated |

== See also ==
- List of people with brain tumors
