= James Lapine =

American stage director and librettist

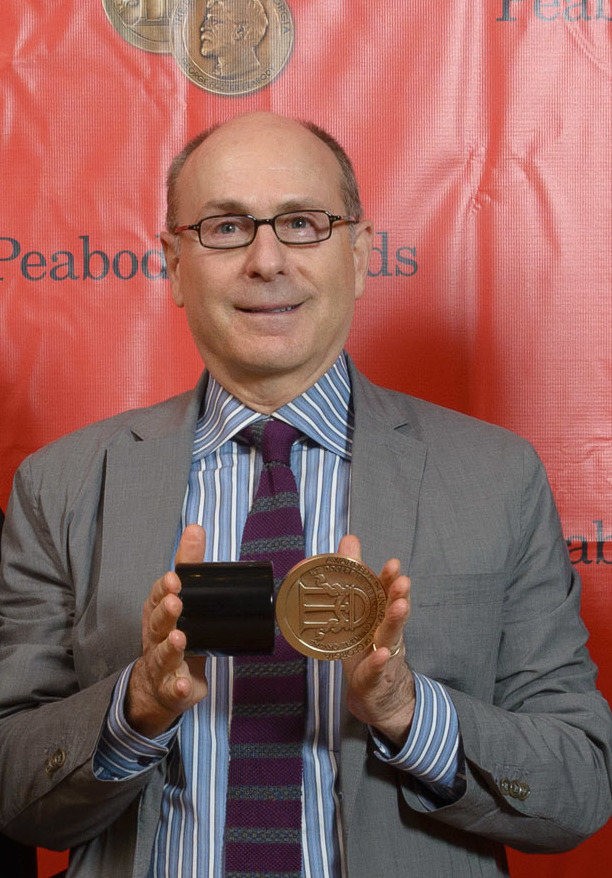
- Lapine at the 73rd Annual Peabody Awards
- Born: James Elliot Lapine; January 10, 1949 (age 77); Mansfield, Ohio, U.S.
- Education: Franklin and Marshall College (BA); California Institute of the Arts (MFA)
- Occupations: Stage director, playwright, screenwriter, librettist
- Years active: 1977–present
- Spouse: Sarah Kernochan
- Children: 1
- Awards: Pulitzer Prize for Drama (1985)

James Elliot Lapine (born January 10, 1949) is an American stage director, playwright, screenwriter, and librettist. He has won the Tony Award for Best Book of a Musical three times, for Into the Woods, Falsettos, and Passion, as well as the Pulitzer Prize for Drama for Sunday in the Park with George. He has frequently collaborated with Stephen Sondheim and William Finn.

== Early life ==
Lapine was born on January 10, 1949, in Mansfield, Ohio, the son of Lillian (Feld) and David Sanford Lapine. He graduated from Franklin and Marshall College in 1971. Though he did not actively pursue theatre in childhood, Lapine did play Jack in an elementary school production of Jack and the Beanstalk.

== Career ==
Lapine studied photography and graphic design at the California Institute of the Arts, where he received an MFA in 1973. He was a photographer, graphic designer, and architectural preservationist, and taught design at the Yale School of Drama. At Yale University he wrote an adaptation of and directed Gertrude Stein's Photograph, which was produced off-Broadway at the Open Space in SoHo in 1977. He went on to write and direct off-Broadway plays and musicals, directing composer William Finn's March of the Falsettos in 1981; the musical won the Outer Critics Circle Award for Best Off-Broadway Play. Frank Rich, the New York Times theater critic, noted "Mr. Lapine's wildly resourceful staging".

In 1982, Lapine was introduced to Stephen Sondheim. The pair developed Sunday in the Park with George: Lapine wrote the book and directed; Sondheim created the music and lyrics. The play was first produced off-Broadway in 1983, and moved to Broadway in 1984. Their next musical was Into the Woods, which premiered on Broadway in 1987, for which Lapine won the Tony Award for Best Book of a Musical and the Drama Desk Award for Outstanding Book of a Musical. They next collaborated on the musical Passion, for which Lapine wrote the book and directed. The musical ran on Broadway in 1994 and in the West End in 1996, receiving a nomination for the Laurence Olivier Award for Best New Musical, and winning the Tony Award for Best Musical and the Tony Award for Best Book of a Musical, among other awards and nominations. Their last collaboration was the revue Sondheim on Sondheim. Presented on Broadway in 2010, it won the Drama Desk Award for Outstanding Revue.

In 1992, Lapine returned to working with William Finn, and wrote the book and directed the Broadway musical Falsettos. Lapine wrote the book and Finn composed the music for A New Brain, which premiered off-Broadway in 1998. They later worked together on Finn's musical The 25th Annual Putnam County Spelling Bee, which premiered off-Broadway in 2005 and later moved to Broadway. The New York Times reviewer wrote of the Spelling Bee Broadway transfer that "Mr. Lapine has sharpened all the musical's elements without betraying its appealing modesty." The latest Finn-Lapine work is Little Miss Sunshine, which premiered in 2011 at the La Jolla Playhouse in California.

Lapine has also directed dramas, including Dirty Blonde, which ran off-Broadway and then on Broadway in 2000. Conceived by Claudia Shear and Lapine, and written by Shear with direction by Lapine, Ben Brantley called Lapine's direction "stylish and compassionate". Lapine was nominated for the Tony Award and Drama Desk Award for Best Direction of a Play.

Lapine directed the 2012 Broadway revival of Annie. He wrote a stage adaption of the Moss Hart autobiography Act One, which premiered on Broadway at the Lincoln Center Vivian Beaumont Theater in April 2014.

Lapine wrote the book for and directed the new musical Flying Over Sunset. A staged singing/reading was presented at the Vineyard Arts Project (Martha's Vineyard) in August 2015. The composer is Tom Kitt and lyrics are by Michael Korie. The musical premiered on Broadway at the Vivian Beaumont Theater on November 11, 2021, in previews with the official opening scheduled for December 13. The production was originally scheduled to open on April 16, 2020, but was postponed due to the COVID-19 pandemic.

In 1991, Lapine directed his first film, Impromptu, which has a screenplay by his wife, Sarah Kernochan. The story revolves around the romance of George Sand and Frédéric Chopin, and stars Judy Davis and Hugh Grant. He followed with Life With Mikey, with Michael J. Fox for Disney. In 1993, he directed Passion, starring the original Broadway cast, for television. He directed the film version of Anne Tyler's novel Earthly Possessions, starring Susan Sarandon and Stephen Dorff, for HBO in 1999. He wrote the screenplay for Disney's film version of Into the Woods (2014), directed by Rob Marshall. He wrote and directed the film Custody in 2016 with Viola Davis, Hayden Panettiere, and Catalina Sandino Moreno.

Lapine received the 2015 Mr. Abbott Award at a special gala on October 19, 2015. The award is presented by the Stage Directors and Choreographers Foundation "in recognition of a lifetime of exceptional achievement in the theatre." Lapine's book Putting It Together: How Stephen Sondheim and I Created Sunday in the Park with George was released on August 3, 2021, and reviewed by Alan Cumming in a cover story in the New York Times Book Review on August 8, 2021.

== Personal life ==
Lapine is married to American screenwriter and director Sarah Kernochan. The couple's daughter is food writer Phoebe Lapine. James Lapine's niece, Sarna Lapine, directed the 2016 concert version and the 2017 Broadway revival of Sunday in the Park with George.

Lapine is Jewish, and several of his works explore Jewish and Jewish-American identity and culture.

== Theater ==
As a director, Lapine has worked on:

- Photograph by Gertrude Stein (1977)
- Twelve Dreams (1978; 1981; 1995) – 1981 Public Theater
- Table Settings (1979; 1980) – Playwrights Horizons
- March of the Falsettos (1981) – composed by William Finn
- A Midsummer Night's Dream (1982) – written by William Shakespeare
- Sunday in the Park with George (1984) – composed by Stephen Sondheim
- Merrily We Roll Along (1981, La Jolla Playhouse) – composed by Stephen Sondheim
- Into the Woods (1987; 1997; 2002) – composed by Stephen Sondheim
- The Winter's Tale (1989) – written by William Shakespeare
- Falsettoland (1990) – composed by William Finn
- Falsettos (1992; 2016) – composed by William Finn
- Passion (1994) – composed by Stephen Sondheim
- Luck, Pluck, and Virtue (1995) – La Jolla Playhouse and Atlantic Theatre Company
- Golden Child (1996; 1998) – written by David Henry Hwang
- The Diary of Anne Frank (1997) – written by Frances Goodrich and Albert Hackett, revised by Wendy Kesselman
- Der Glöckner von Notre Dame (1999, original Berlin version) – composed by Alan Menken and Stephen Schwartz
- Dirty Blonde (2000) – written by Claudia Shear
- Amour (2002) – composed by Michel Legrand
- Fran's Bed (2003; 2005) – Long Wharf Theatre; Playwrights Horizons
- Modern Orthodox (2004)
- The 25th Annual Putnam County Spelling Bee (2005) – composed by William Finn
- King Lear (2007) – written by William Shakespeare
- Sondheim on Sondheim (2010) – musical revue of Stephen Sondheim work
- Little Miss Sunshine (2011, La Jolla Playhouse; 2013) – composed by William Finn
- Annie (2012) – Music by Charles Strouse, lyrics by Martin Charnin, and book by Thomas Meehan
- Act One (2014) – Broadway, Lincoln Center
- Mrs. Miller Does Her Thing (2016) – Signature Theatre (Virginia)
- Flying Over Sunset (2021)

Writer, musicals

He has written the libretti for the following musicals:

- Sunday in the Park with George – 1984
- Into the Woods – 1987
- Falsettoland – 1990
- Falsettos – 1992
- Passion – 1994
- Der Glöckner von Notre Dame – 1999 (original Berlin version)
- A New Brain (off-Broadway) – 1999
- Little Miss Sunshine – 2011
- Flying Over Sunset – 2021

Writer, plays

- Table Settings – 1979 and 1980 at Playwrights Horizons
- Twelve Dreams – 1978; 1981 Public Theater
- Luck, Pluck, and Virtue – 1995, La Jolla Playhouse and Atlantic Theatre Company, both starring Neil Patrick Harris
- The Moment When – 2000, Playwrights Horizons, featuring Mark Ruffalo and Phyllis Newman
- Fran's Bed – 2003, Long Wharf Theatre, starring Mia Farrow; 2005 Playwrights Horizons
- Act One – 2014, Broadway, Lincoln Center
- Mrs. Miller Does Her Thing – 2016, Signature Theatre (Virginia), featuring Debra Monk

== Film ==
Year	Film	Role	Notes
1991	Impromptu	Director	
1993	Life with Mikey	Director	
1999	Earthly Possessions	Director	TV movie
2013	Six by Sondheim	Director	TV documentary
2014	Into the Woods	Screenplay	
2016	Custody	Director, screenplay	
2022	In the Company of Rose	Director, Cinematographer	Documentary

== Published works ==
- Putting It Together: How Stephen Sondheim and I Created Sunday in the Park with George (2021) ISBN 9780374200091

== Awards and nominations ==
Year	Award	Category	Work	Result
1984	Tony Award	Best Book of a Musical	Sunday in the Park with George	Nominated
1984	Tony Award	Best Direction of a Musical	Sunday in the Park with George	Nominated
1984	Drama Desk Awards	Outstanding Book of a Musical	Sunday in the Park with George	Won
1984	Drama Desk Awards	Outstanding Director of a Musical	Sunday in the Park with George	Won
1984	New York Drama Critics' Circle Award	Best Musical	Sunday in the Park with George	Won
1984	Guggenheim Fellowship	Drama & Performance Art	Sunday in the Park with George	Honored
1985	Pulitzer Prize	Drama	Sunday in the Park with George	Won
1988	Tony Award	Best Book of a Musical	Into the Woods	Won
1988	Tony Award	Best Direction of a Musical	Into the Woods	Nominated
1988	Drama Desk Awards	Outstanding Book of a Musical	Into the Woods	Won
1988	Drama Desk Awards	Outstanding Director of a Musical	Into the Woods	Nominated
1988	New York Drama Critics' Circle Award	Best Musical	Into the Woods	Won
1992	Tony Award	Best Book of a Musical	Falsettos	Won
1992	Tony Award	Best Direction of a Musical	Falsettos	Nominated
1994	Tony Award	Best Book of a Musical	Passion	Won
1994	Tony Award	Best Direction of a Musical	Passion	Nominated
1994	Drama Desk Awards	Outstanding Book of a Musical	Passion	Won
1994	Drama Desk Awards	Outstanding Director of a Musical	Passion	Nominated
2000	Tony Award	Best Direction of a Play	Dirty Blonde	Nominated
2002	Tony Award	Best Direction of a Musical	Into the Woods	Nominated
2002	Drama Desk Award	Outstanding Director of a Musical	Into the Woods	Nominated
2002	Outer Critics Circle Award	Outstanding Director of a Musical	Into the Woods	Nominated
2003	Drama Desk Award	Outstanding Director of a Musical	Amour	Nominated
2005	Tony Award	Best Direction of a Musical	The 25th Annual Putnam County Spelling Bee	Nominated
2005	Drama Desk Award	Outstanding Director of a Musical	The 25th Annual Putnam County Spelling Bee	Won
2014	Primetime Emmy Awards	Outstanding Directing for a Variety Special	Six by Sondheim	Nominated
2014	Tony Award	Best Play	Act One	Nominated
2015	Cinema Eye Honors	Outstanding Achievement in Nonfiction Filmmaking for Television	Six by Sondheim	Nominated
2020	Drama League Award	Distinguished Achievement in Musical Theatre		Honored
2026	Tony Award	Lifetime Achievement Tony Award		Honored
