= Paris (1929 film) =

1929 pre-Code American musical comedy film

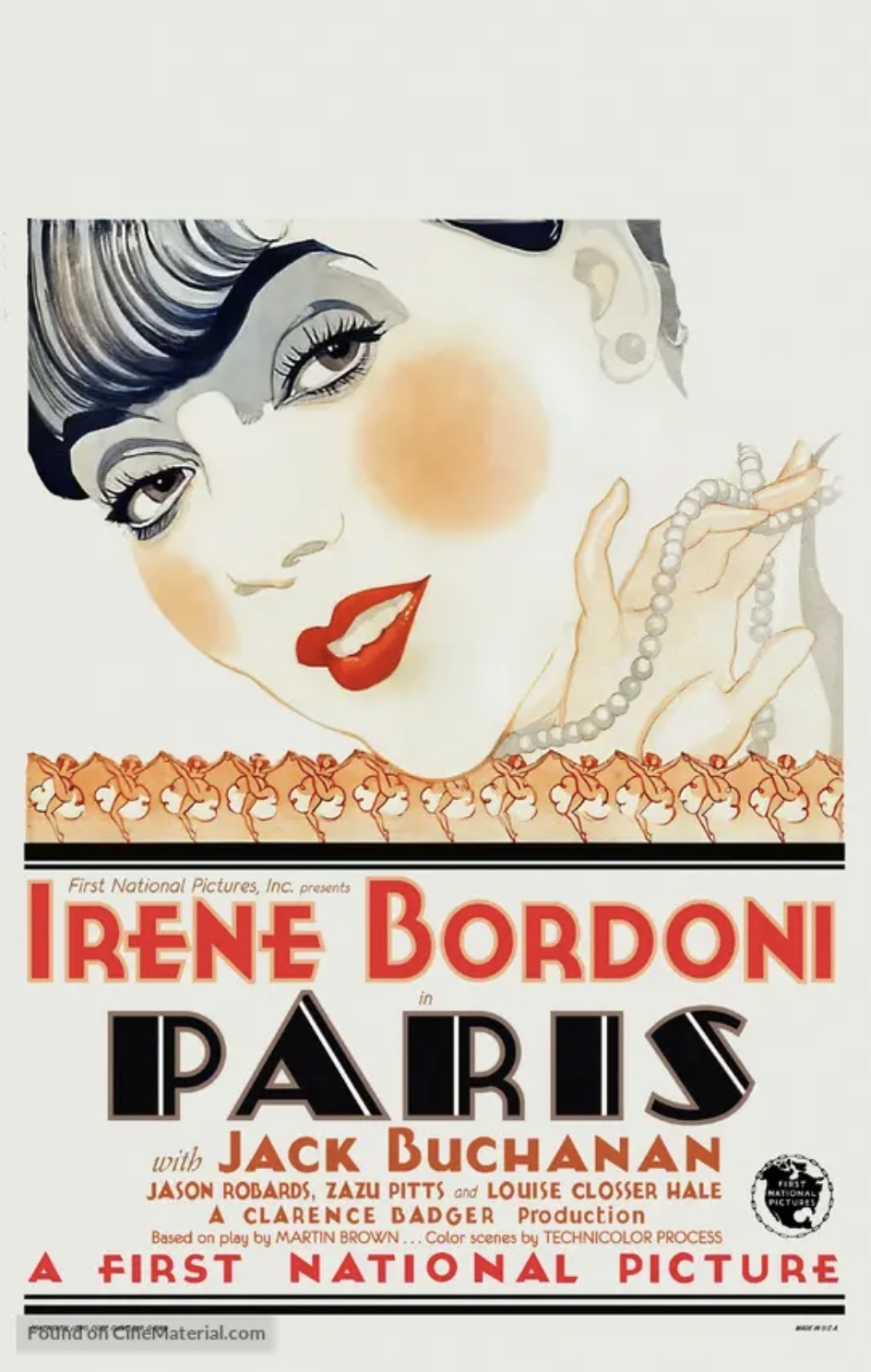
- Theatrical release poster
- Directed by: Clarence G. Badger
- Written by: Martin Brown; E. Ray Goetz; Hope Loring (titles)
- Based on: Paris by Martin Brown
- Produced by: Robert North
- Starring: Irène Bordoni; Jack Buchanan; Louise Closser Hale; Jason Robards; ZaSu Pitts
- Cinematography: Sol Polito
- Edited by: Edward Schroeder
- Music by: Cole Porter; Edward Ward; Al Bryan
- Production company: First National Pictures
- Distributed by: Warner Bros. Pictures
- Release dates: November 7, 1929 (US); December 13, 1929 (LDN); May 2, 1930 (IRE); June 23, 1930 (UK)
- Running time: 97 minutes
- Country: United States
- Language: English
- Budget: $431,000
- Box office: $1,173,000

Paris is a 1929 American sound (All-Talking) pre-Code musical comedy film, featuring Irène Bordoni. It was filmed with Technicolor sequences: four of the film's ten reels were originally filmed in Technicolor.

Paris was the fourth color film released by Warner Bros. Pictures; the first three were The Desert Song (although it was only a part-color film), On with the Show!, and Gold Diggers of Broadway, all released in 1929. (Song of the West was actually completed by June 1929 but had its release delayed until March 1930.) The film was adapted from the Cole Porter Broadway musical of the same name. The musical was Porter's first Broadway hit. Only fragment film elements of Paris are known to exist, although the complete international soundtrack survives on Vitaphone disks. The sound tape reels for this film survive at UCLA Film & Television Archive.

Paris was the fourth film Warner Bros. made under their Technicolor contract. The filmmakers used a color (Technicolor) process of red and green, at the time it was the third process of Technicolor.

== Plot ==
Andrew Sabbot, a naïve young man from New England, travels to Paris against the wishes of his stern puritanical mother Cora, to study art. After six months in the City of Light, Andrew becomes captivated by Vivienne Rolland, a glamorous and spirited revue actress who reigns as the toast of the Parisian stage.

Vivienne, intrigued by Andrew's earnest charm and provincial innocence, quickly warms to him. Andrew proposes to Vivienne, and she agrees to—on the condition that his mother approves.

Guy Pennell, Vivienne's suave and dashing leading man in the revue, is singing "The Land of Going to Be" on his hotel room piano. Vivienne finishes the song. Guy has his own romantic intentions for Vivienne, but has not expressed them.

Determined to secure Cora's blessing, Vivienne makes every effort to win her over by dressing puritanically. Cora, who is very set in her puritanical ways, disapproves of actresses and travels to Paris herself, bringing along her demure companion, Brenda Kaley, intending to put an end to the romance. Vivienne meets a weary Cora with grace and humility, pledging not to marry Andrew without her consent, but Cora is unwavering and flatly refuses.

Soon after, Guy enters and recognizes the dismay that Cora inflicted, and decides to sabotage Vivienne and Andrew’s engagement.

After Cora faints from the shock of traveling, Guy sees this as an opportunity to get between Vivienne and Guy. His plan is to let Cora get loose and follow his plan to break up Vivienne and Andrew. He orders her scandalous food, which makes her faint again. Guy, in a panic, tries to get her to wake up by dosing her with brandy, and it works. Cora, surprisingly taken with the taste, becomes tipsy and liberated. Emboldened by her new attitude, she transforms into a flapper, and indulging in a flirtatious liaison with none other than Guy Pennell himself.

Cora, Brenda, and Andrew attend that evening’s performance of Guy and Vivienne’e revue. Vivienne Glittered on the stage as the "Crystal Girl" number plays. She next appears in the number "Don’t Look at Me that Way!" Guy does his signature number, "Miss Wonderful".

Cora Sabbot is revealed to have become a woman transformed, due largely to the company of Guy Pennell. Andrew, Vivienne, Brenda and Harriet are all equally dumbfounded by the change.

Soon after, Vivienne tries to ask Guy why he is having romantic intentions toward Cora and why he went so far with her, to which he replies that she wanted to marry Andrew.

Soon after, Cora and Guy announce their engagement, much to Andrew’s horror. Andrew tells Vivienne that she is through with the stage, to which she replies that Vivienne’s family were decent people—unlike Cora. Vivienne kicks out Andrew and laughs at the scene that unfolded.

The next main number starts, "Somebody Mighty Like You". It quickly ends and goes into the song "Paris", with a spectacular chorus. It merges into Vivienne’s performance of "I Wonder what is Really on His Mind". Jack Buchanan then delivers his performance of "I’m a Little Negative (Looking for a Positive)". This merges into Vivienne’s performance of "Among My Souvenirs" and "It all Depends on You" in French. The finale of the revue is finally shown, with the chorus behind a set resembling hell, and reprising "Crystal Girl", "Miss Wonderful", "The Land of Going to Be", "My Lover", and a final reprise of "Paris".

Meanwhile, Vivienne, growing suspicious of Guy's true feelings, orchestrates a scheme to test him. She orders Harriett to light smoke pots backstage to simulate a fire and incite panic. Nearly-naked chorus girls and costumed performers pour into the streets in confusion. But the plan misfires—Vivienne and Cora are both ushered out before Guy has the chance to "heroically" save either woman. A too-tired Andrew Sabbott watches the events unfold, and has once again become puritanical, breaking up with Vivienne.

Afterward, Vivienne releases that her and Andrew were calling off their engagement. She faints from the series of events that unfolded, and Guy tells Vivienne that it was all a hoax. Vivienne and Guy embrace, while Cora beams happily, and the pair pull the not-so-monstrous woman to them as the film concludes.

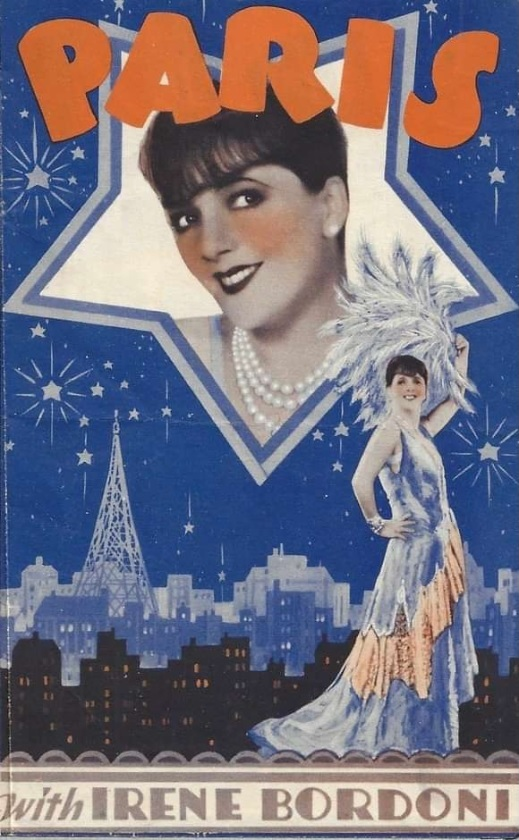
Cover of a movie herald for Paris

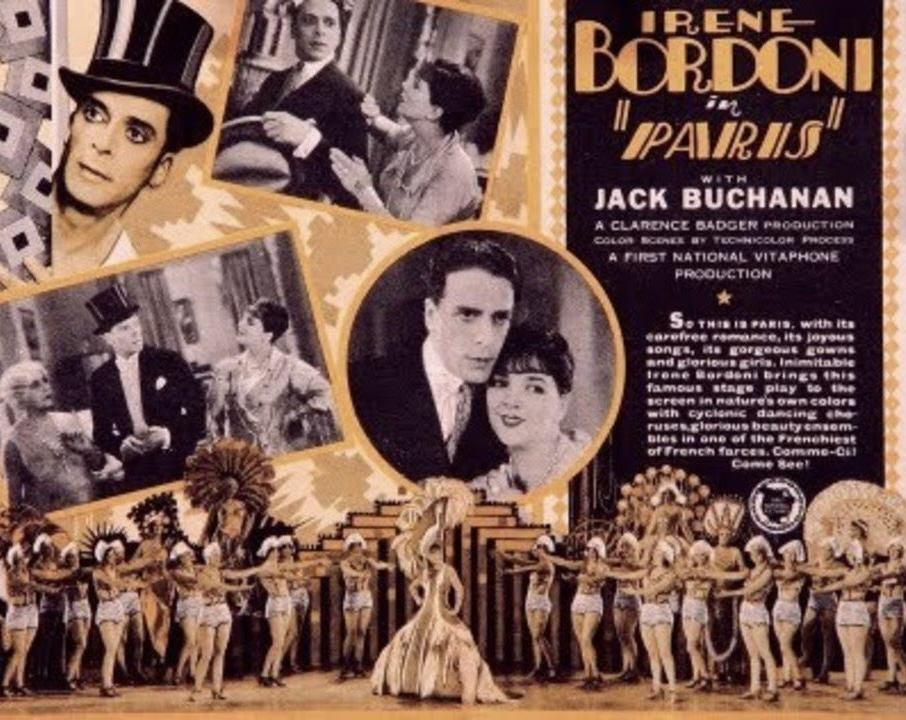
Inside of a movie herald for Paris

== Cast ==
- Irène Bordoni as Vivienne Rolland
- Jack Buchanan as Guy Pennell
- Louise Closser Hale as Cora Sabbot
- Jason Robards as Andrew Sabbot
- ZaSu Pitts as Harriet
- Margaret Fielding as Brenda Kaley
- Ruth Eddings as Chorus Girl (uncredited)
- Peggy Larson as Chorus Girl (uncredited)
- Gloria Stratton as Chorus Girl (uncredited)
- Irene Thompson as Chorus Girl (uncredited)
- The Larry Ceballos Girls as Dancers (uncredited)

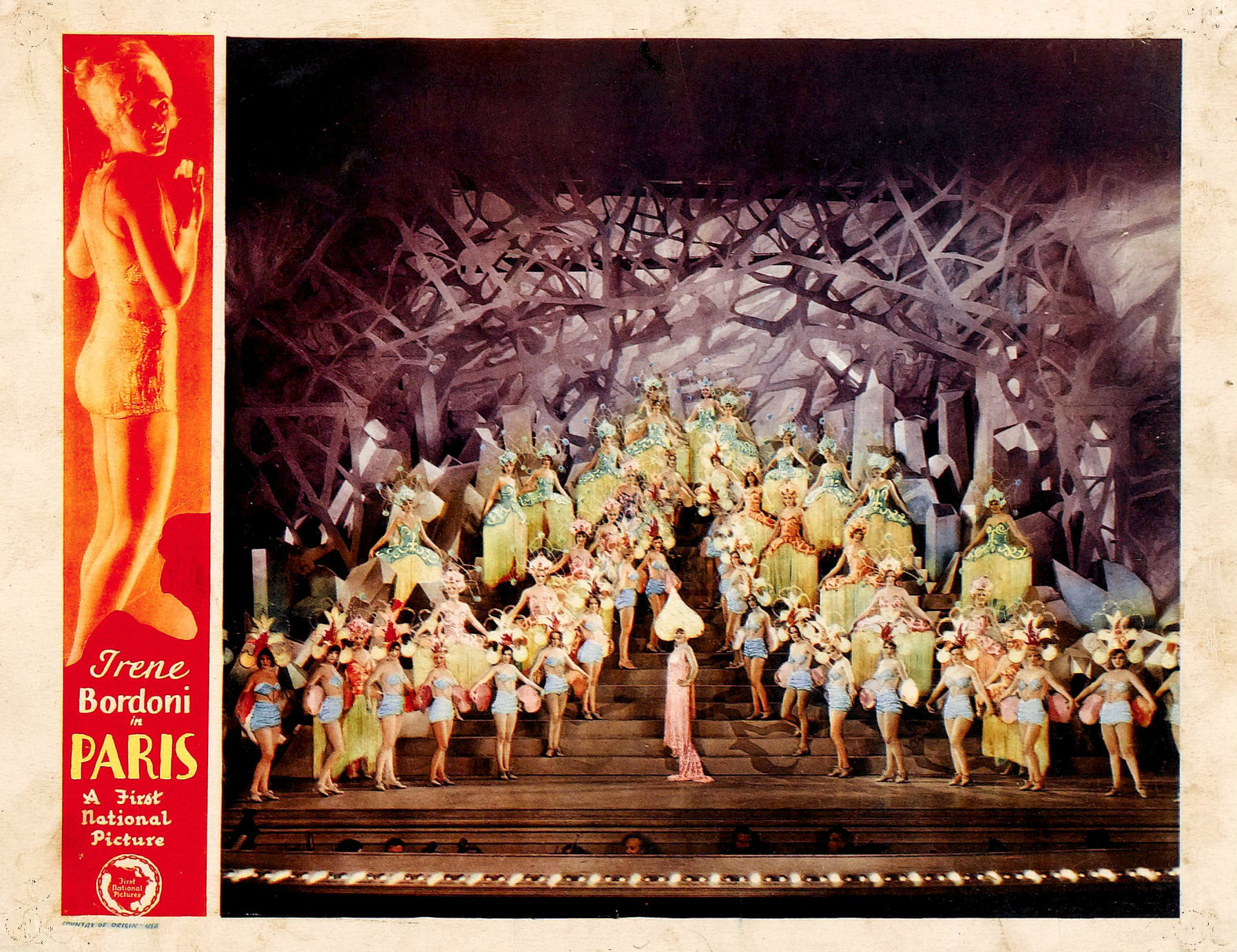
The set for "Crystal Girl"

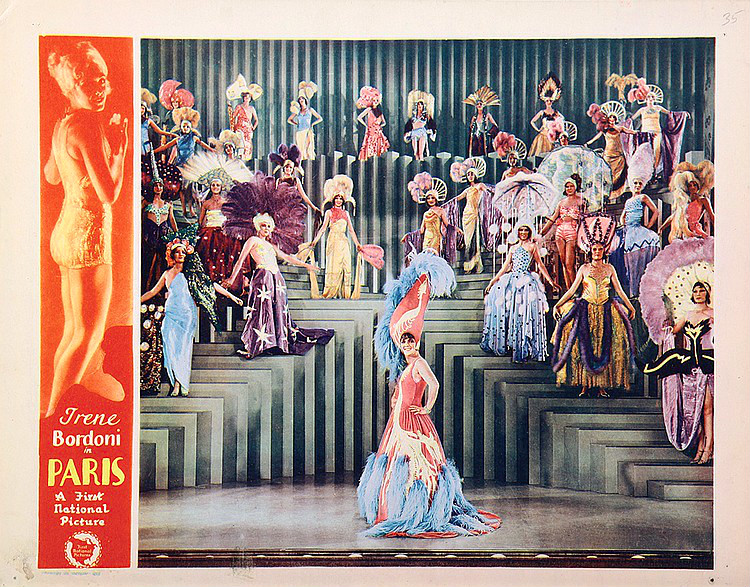
The set for "Paris"

== Production ==
Warner Bros. paid the celebrated French music hall star and Broadway chanteuse Irène Bordoni $10,000 a week to star in this film, playing the role she had originated on Broadway, introducing the enduring Porter standard "Let's Do It, Let's Fall in Love". While this film was being shot, the studio was in the process of completing their all-star revue The Show of Shows (1929), so they had Bordoni film a number for the revue. Their initial intention was to have Bordoni star in two musical features, but due to the poor box-office reception of the Broadway production of Paris, they decided not to make any more films with her.

4 of the film’s 10 reels were filmed in Technicolor.

Film methods used in "Paris"
| Reel(s) | Film type |
|---|---|
| 1–3 | Black and white |
| 4–5 | Technicolor |
| 6 | Black and white |
| 7-9 | Technicolor |
| 10 | Black and white |

It was Buchanan's first American film.

== Songs ==
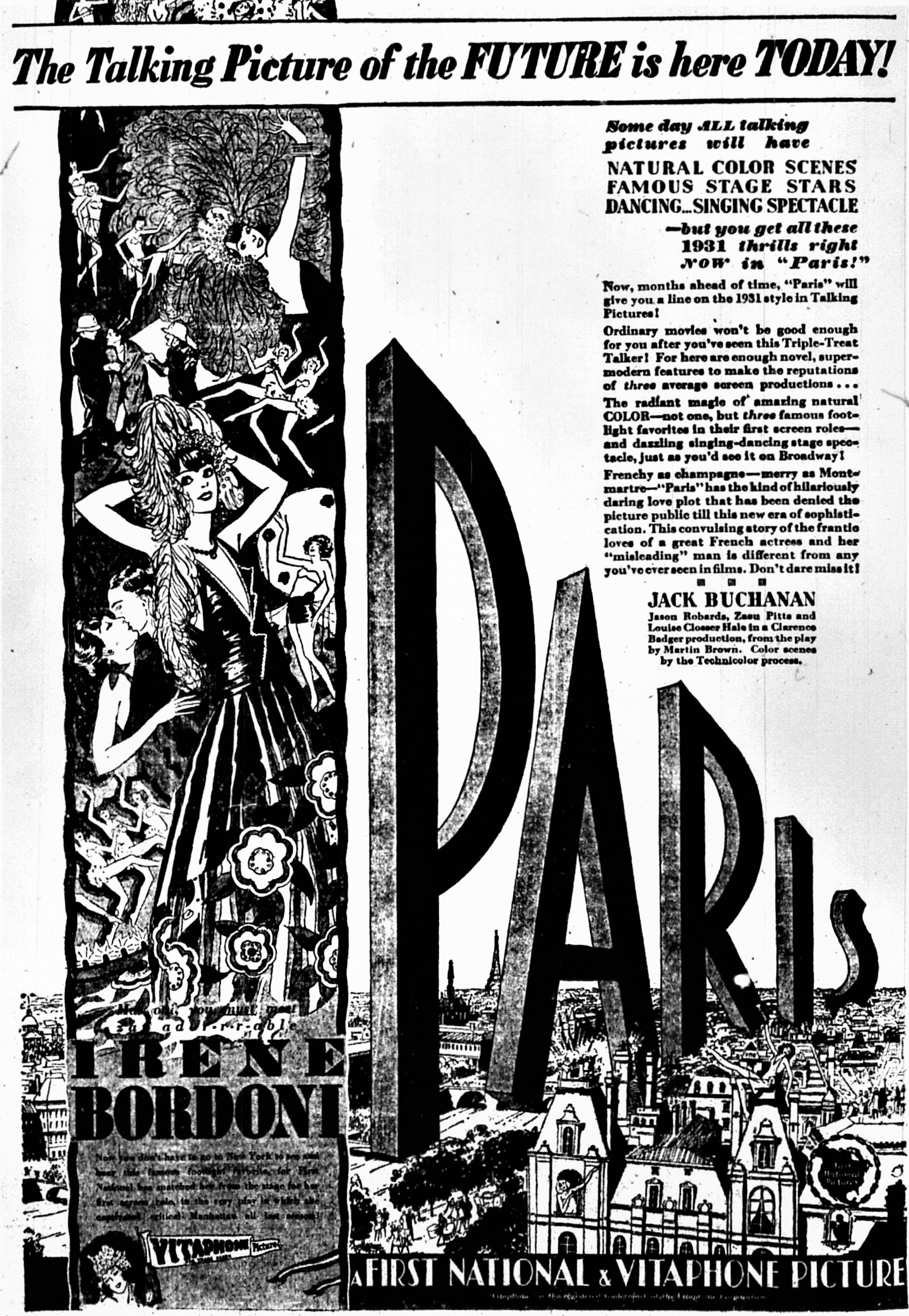
An advertisement for Paris from Variety magazine.

- "The Land of Going to Be"- by Cole Porter, performed by Jack Buchanan and Irène Bordoni with Jack Buchanan on piano
- "Crystal Girl"- by Al Bryan and Eddie Ward, performed by First National Vitaphone Stage Chorus and Orchestra
- "Don't Look at Me That Way!"- by Cole Porter, performed by Irène Bordoni with First National Vitaphone Orchestra
- "Miss Wonderful"- by Al Bryan and Eddie Ward, performed by Jack Buchanan with First National Vitaphone Orchestra and Stage Chorus
- "Somebody Mighty Like You"- by Al Bryan and Eddie Ward, performed by Irène Bordoni and Jack Buchanan with First National Vitaphone Orchestra
- "Paris"- by E. Ray Goetz and Louis Alter, performed by Irène Bordoni with First National Vitaphone Orchestra and Stage Chorus
- "I Wonder What is Really on His Mind"- by Al Bryan and Eddie Ward, performed by Irène Bordoni with First National Vitaphone Orchestra
- "I'm a Little Negative (Looking for a Positive)"- by Al Bryan and Eddie Ward, performed by Jack Buchanan with First National Vitaphone Orchestra
- "Among My Souvenirs"- by Buddy DeSylva, Lew Brown, and Ray Henderson, performed by Irène Bordoni with First National Vitaphone Orchestra
- "It All Depends on You"- by Buddy DeSylva, Lew Brown, and Ray Henderson, performed by Irène Bordoni with First National Vitaphone Orchestra
- Finale; Paris Medley, "Crystal Girl"(First National Vitaphone Orchestra and Stage Chorus)/"Miss Wonderful"(First National Vitaphone Orchestra and Stage Chorus)/"The Land of Going to Be"(Irène Bordoni with First National Vitaphone Orchestra)/"My Lover"(Irène Bordoni with First National Vitaphone Orchestra)/"Paris"(First National Vitaphone Orchestra and Stage Chorus)

== Preservation ==
One of the color reels from Paris exists at the British Film Institute (BFI) archive. The complete international soundtrack also survives on Vitaphone disks in the synchronized sound version. Only disc 7 of the American talking version exists. The sound tape reels for this film survive at UCLA Film & Television Archive. According to the George Eastman Museum's 2015 book The Dawn of Technicolor, 1915-1935, there are three fragments at the Seaver Center. In 2018, BFI discovered a one-minute Technicolor fragment being used as a film leader, along with fragments of various other films, which are included in video posted to YouTube on April 27, 2018.

== Box office ==
According to Warner Bros. records, the film earned $632,000 domestically and $541,000 in other markets.

== See also ==
- List of early color feature films
- List of early sound feature films (1926–1929)
- List of incomplete or partially lost films
- List of First National Pictures films
- List of songs about Paris
- List of films set in Paris
