= Let's Misbehave =

Song written by Cole Porter

Song by Irene Bordoni
- Written: 1927
- Published: June 21, 1927 Harms, Inc.
- Songwriter: Cole Porter

"Let's Misbehave" is a song written by Cole Porter in 1927, originally intended for the female lead of his first major musical production, Paris. It was discarded before the Broadway opening in favor of "Let's Do It, Let's Fall in Love". However, the star of the Broadway production, Irene Bordoni, performed it for a phonograph recording which was labelled as being from the production of Paris.

The song with partial lyrics was a notable 1928 hit for Irving Aaronson and his Commanders. The song was recorded with partial lyrics for the Brunswick label by Scrappy Lambert and Billy Hillpot with Ben Bernie's orchestra in December 1927. In January 1928, Harry Reser's band "The Bluebirds" recorded their version of the song with the personnel consisting of Tommy Gott on trumpet, Larry Abbott on alto saxophone and clarinet, Jimmy Johnston on bass saxophone, William Wirges on piano, Murray Kellner on violin, Harry Reser on banjo and acoustic guitar, and Tom Stacks on drums and singing. Banjo Buddy (a.k.a. Harold Sandelman) recorded the full lyrics and verse in April 1928.

"Let's Misbehave" was added to the 1962 off-Broadway revival of Anything Goes. It was also added into the 1991 version of Porter's You Never Know.

== Other notable versions ==
- The song is covered by actor Billy Dee Williams on his 1961 album Let's Misbehave.
- Bobby Short sang the song on his 1974 album Live at the Cafe Carlyle.
- A version of "Let's Misbehave" sung by Cybill Shepherd appears in the 1975 film At Long Last Love, and in the 2008 film Easy Virtue, and one of the latter film's taglines.
- The song is featured in a prominent dance sequence by Christopher Walken in the Steve Martin musical Pennies From Heaven (1981).
- It is sung by Elvis Costello in the 2004 movie De-Lovely.
- "Dead Air", the 2013 season 2 finale of the Australian TV show Miss Fisher's Murder Mysteries, ends with a performance of the song.
- American swing revivalists the Cherry Poppin' Daddies recorded a version of the song for their 2016 covers album The Boop-A-Doo.
