= Irène Bordoni =

French-American actress (1885–1953)

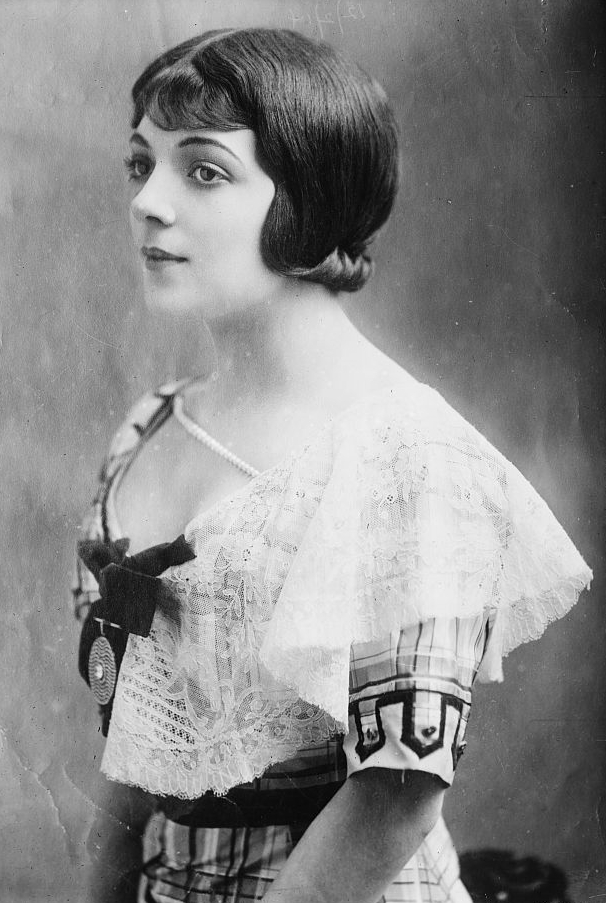
- Born: 16 January 1885; Paris, France
- Died: 19 March 1953 (aged 68); Manhattan, New York City, U.S.
- Occupations: Actress, singer
- Years active: 1914–1951
- Spouses: Edgar Becman (m. 1917, divorced) E. Ray Goetz (m. 1918; div. 1929)
- Family: Francis Davis Millet (great-uncle)

Irène Bordoni (16 January 1885 – 19 March 1953) was a Franco-American actress and singer.

== Early years ==
Bordoni was born in Paris, France, to Sauveur Bordoni, a tailor, and Marie Lemonnier. The 19th-century painter Francis Millet was a great-uncle who died in the Titanic disaster. She became a child actor, performing in Paris on stage and in silent films for a few years, having signed with theatrical agent André Charlot. Bordoni made her first appearance on the stage at the age of 13 at the Variétés, Paris.

She went to the United States on 28 December 1907, in steerage on the S.S. La Provence. Bordoni's year of birth is given in standard theatrical biographies as 1895, but her real birth year is 1885. She was 22 on the ship's passenger list when she arrived in the United States in 1907. She went first to Reno, Nevada, where her father had reportedly settled previously.

== Broadway ==
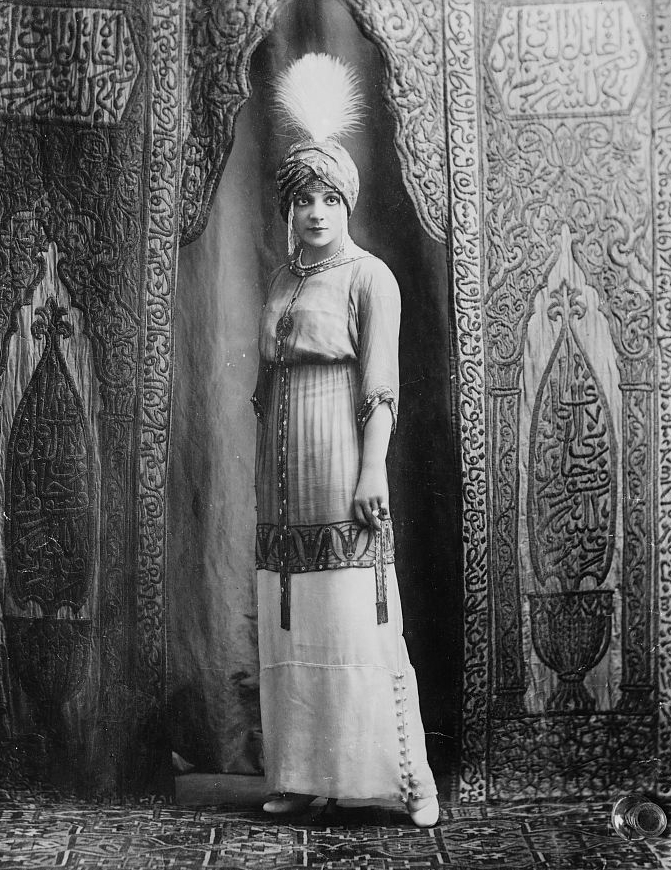
Irène Bordoni on stage

Bordoni made her Broadway debut in a Shubert brothers production of Broadway to Paris at the Winter Garden Theatre and was a successor to Anna Held as Broadway's idea of French piquancy and Continental flavor. She was in Miss Information (1915) and successive productions of Hitchy-Koo (1917 and 1918). 1919 audiences saw Bordoni in Sleeping Partners co-starring with H.B. Warner at the Bijou. In 1920, her "captivating voice and presence" graced As You Were at the Central Theater.

Bordoni introduced George Gershwin's hit song "Do It Again" with vivacity and verve in the 1922 Broadway show The French Doll at the Lyceum. The title of the show became her nickname. She also starred in Little Miss Bluebeard (1923) and Naughty Cinderella (1925) by Avery Hopwood, about which the theatre critic for the New York Times said, "Of Miss Bordoni one can report only what has been reported many times. Her voice, her accent and particularly her reeling eyes are, as ever, unmistakably attractive."

Noted for her seductive brown eyes and coquettish personality, Irène Bordoni is probably best remembered from musical theatre as the star of the 1928 Cole Porter musical Paris that featured the song "Let's Do It (Let's Fall in Love)" which became Porter's first big success. Bordoni recorded and sang many times live and on radio Cole Porter's song "Let's Misbehave" with Irving Aaronson and His Commanders dance band. The song has been included on the soundtrack of five motion pictures including Everything You Always Wanted to Know About Sex* (*But Were Afraid to Ask) (1972), Pennies from Heaven (1981) and Bullets Over Broadway (1994). Porter later included Bordoni's name in the lyrics of his song You're the Top ("you're the eyes of Irène Bordoni") from the musical Anything Goes (1934).

Throughout her Broadway career, Bordoni was renowned for wearing only the most stylish of clothes, including costumes by Erté. During this time, Bordoni appeared in Lucky Strike cigarette advertisements with the quip "I smoke a Lucky to keep petite," which was said to have contributed to the tremendous increase in women's smoking in the 1920s.

Bordoni wore her hair with trademark bangs, which she helped to popularize; indeed her 'look' was successfully emulated not only by her admirers but also by late 1920s budding Broadway starlet Claudette Colbert. She was stockbroker W.D. Hutton's first customer when he opened his branch office on West 57th Street.

During the 1930s, she was a guest singer on many variety programs as well as being featured on The RKO Hour. Bordoni pleased audiences on both sides of the Atlantic, as with Irving Berlin's It's a Lovely Day Tomorrow in London's West End in 1939.

== In Hollywood ==
Bordoni made her Hollywood debut in Warner Brothers Show of Shows (1928). In 1929, her Broadway play Paris was adapted to a talkie, also called Paris, for which she reprised her starring role. The film used the Vitaphone sound-on-disc sound system and was shot in early Technicolor. That year Bordoni also performed "Just an Hour of Love" (by Al Bryan and Ed Ward) for the Warner Brothers film The Show of Shows produced by Darryl F. Zanuck. In 1932, Max Fleischer featured her in his follow-the-bouncing-ball Screen Song cartoon "Just A Gigolo".

Her status as a major star of the American stage was such that in his song "You're The Top", Cole Porter included the reference "You’re the eyes of Irene Bordoni". During the 1930s, she continued to perform on stage and starred in another Warner Brothers musical comedy film. In 1940, Bordoni was part of another major Broadway success with the Irving Berlin musical Louisiana Purchase and again reprised her role in the Paramount Pictures film Louisiana Purchase (1941) with Bob Hope. She had another success in the role of "Bloody Mary" in the 1951 national tour of the musical South Pacific.

== Personal life ==
Bordoni was married to actor Edgar Becman, whom she divorced in 1917. She married again on 24 October 1918 to Broadway producer and lyricist E. Ray Goetz, who produced many of her Broadway shows (and whose sister Dorothy Goetz was Irving Berlin's first wife), but they divorced in 1929.

At the height of her international appeal, she maintained homes in increasingly stylish New York neighborhoods: from 230 West End Avenue to 108 East 78th Street to 104 East 40th Street – as well as in Paris and Monte Carlo. She invested in real estate in Palm Beach in the 1920s during the Florida land boom. Bordoni was later associated with theatrical agent and producer Avery Galen Bogue (1896–1951).

She died on 19 March 1953 at Jewish Memorial Hospital in Manhattan. She was interred in the Ferncliff Cemetery in Hartsdale, New York.

== Songs associated with Bordoni ==
Bordoni introduced or was the first interpreter of the following songs:

- "Do It Again"
- "I Won't Say I Will but I Won't Say I Won't"
- "So This Is Love"
- "Do I Love You?"
- "Let's Misbehave"
- "Where Is the Song of Songs for Me?"
- "Don't Look at Me That Way"
- "Quelque-Chose"
- "Let's Do It: Let's Fall in Love"
- "You Can't Believe My Eyes"
- "Just an Hour of Love"
- "The Land of Going to Be"
