= Ça, c'est l'amour =

"Ça, c'est l'amour" is a popular song by Cole Porter, published in 1957. It was introduced in the film Les Girls.

The Finnish actress Taina Elg, who plays the role of Angele Ducros in the film, sings the song in a scene with Gene Kelly.

The recording by Tony Bennett,made in New York City on September 19, 1957 (mx. CO 59855), was released by Columbia Records as catalog number 41032. It reached the Billboard charts on November 18, 1957, remaining for only one week. On the Disk Jockey chart, it peaked at #22; on the composite chart of the top 100 songs, it reached #96.
