= Martin Brown (writer) =

Martin Brown (June 22, 1885 – February 13, 1936) was a Canadian-born American playwright, screenwriter, and actor.

== Life and career ==
Born in Montreal, Canada on June 22, 1885, Brown had a career as an actor in both the United States and England from 1907 to 1915. He made his New York stage debut in 1908 at the Herald Square Theatre as Dudley Cheatham in The Girl Behind the Counter. He appeared in the Broadway casts of several more musicals; including Three Twins (1908, as Ned Maryland), The Motor Girl (1909, as Dick Willoughby), The Belle of Brittany (1909, as Baptiste Boubillon), He Came from Milwaukee (1910, as Bruce Chetwynde), Up and Down Broadway (1910, as Erato), The Kiss Waltz (1911, as Paul von Gervais), The Merry Countess (1912, as Prince Orloffsky), A Night with the Pierrots (1912), The Whirl of Society (1912, as Franklyn Copeland), Vera Violetta (1912, as Andrew Mason), and the Ziegfeld Follies of 1913.

Brown starred in Hullo Tango at the London Hippodrome in 1914. In 1915 he was in the cast of The Belle of Bond Street at the Adelphi Theatre in London's West End. That same year he returned to New York as Bum Lung in the revue Hello, Broadway! at the Astor Theatre. After this he abandoned the stage to work as a writer of plays and film scripts. Many of his plays were staged on Broadway.

He died at Bellevue Hospital in New York City on February 13, 1936.

== Partial list of works ==
=== Screenplays ===
- The Desert Man (1917)
- The Garden of Allah (1927)
- The Virtuous Sin (1930); used as the basis for The Night of Decision (1931)
- Java Head (1934)

=== Stage plays ===
- A Very Good Young Man (1918); adapted into the film A Very Good Young Man (1919)
- An Innocent Idea (1920)
- The Exciters (1922); adapted into the film The Exciters (1923)
- The Love Child (1922)
- The Lady (1923); adapted into the films The Lady (1925) and The Secret of Madame Blanche (1933)
- Cobra (1924); adapted into the film Cobra
- Great Music (1924); adapted into the film Soul-Fire (1925)
- The Love Thief (1927)
- The Dark (1927)
- The Strawberry Blonde (1927)
- Paris (1928); adapted into the film Paris (1929)
- The Idol (1929); adapted into the film The Mad Genius (1931)
