= You're the Top =

1934 Cole Porter song

Song by Paul Whiteman
- Published: 1934
- Songwriter: Cole Porter

"You're the Top" is a list song by Cole Porter, from the 1934 musical Anything Goes. It is about a man and a woman who take turns complimenting each other while denigrating themselves. The best-selling version was Paul Whiteman's Victor single, which made the top five. It was the most popular song from Anything Goes at the time, with hundreds of parodies. Some of the lyrics were re-written by P. G. Wodehouse for the British version of Anything Goes. Composer Robert Kapilow refers to "You're the Top" as one of Porter's greatest songs.

== Composition ==
Porter is believed to have written the song in Paris, while eating dinner at the Le Bœuf sur le toit with Lela Emery, the wife of Alastair Mackintosh. The two of them spent the time amusing themselves with a word game, "making up a list of superlatives that rhymed."

== People and items referenced in the song ==
The following is a list of the references used in the version recorded by Cole Porter on November 26, 1934:

- The Colosseum
- The Louvre Museum
- The melody from a symphony by Strauss
- A Bendel bonnet
- A Shakespeare sonnet
- Mickey Mouse
- The Nile
- The Tower of Pisa
- The smile on the Mona Lisa
- Mahatma Gandhi
- Napoleon Brandy
- The purple light of a summer night in Spain
- The National Gallery
- Garbo's salary (alternately recorded as "Crosby's salary", a reference to Bing Crosby, who twice starred in film versions of Anything Goes)
- Cellophane
- A Turkey dinner
- The time of the Derby (pronounced "Darby῾) winner
- A Toy Balloon
- An Arrow collar
- A Coolidge Dollar (referencing the financial prosperity of the Roaring Twenties under US President Coolidge)
- The nimble tread of the feet of Fred Astaire
- An O'Neill drama
- Whistler's mama
- Camembert
- A Rose
- Inferno's Dante
- The nose on the great Durante
- A Waldorf salad
- A Berlin ballad
- An old Dutch Master
- Mrs. Astor: Mary Astor, Lady Astor, Caroline Schermerhorn Astor, or Ellen Tuck French
- Pepsodent
- The Steppes of Russia
- The pants on a Roxy usher
- the lazy lout

The 1934 recording with Cole Porter's vocals and piano is available on Cole Porter: A Centennial Collection (track 18 of 20), Sony Legacy CD release 2007

Additional references in other versions of the song:

- Dance in Bali
- Hot tamale
- A (painting by) Botticelli
- Keats
- Shelley
- Ovaltine
- Dam of Boulder
- The Moon over Mae West's shoulder
- The nominee of the G.O.P. (Republican Party, but this is the unflattering thing the singer says they are, "the bottom"; by 1934 the Republican party had consistently lost every major election since the 1930 midterms, including the 1932 Presidential election and the 1934 midterms)
- Zuider Zee
- Broccoli (which had only recently become well known in the US)
- Ritz hot toddy
- Brewster body
- Bishop Manning
- Nathan panning
- A night at Coney
- The eyes of Irène Bordoni
- Tower of Babel
- Whitney stable
- Stein of beer
- A dress from Saks's
- Next year's taxes
- Stratosphere
- Max Baer
- Russian ballet
- Rudy Vallée
- Phenolax (a 1930s laxative made from phenolphthalein)
- Drumstick lipstick
- Irish Sweepstakes
- Vincent Youmans

P. G. Wodehouse anglicised it for the British version of Anything Goes. Among other changes, he altered two lines from "You’re an O’Neill drama / You’re Whistler’s mama!" to "You’re Mussolini / You’re Mrs Sweeny" (both figures, later notorious, were widely admired at the time)

== Versions of the song ==
- The comedy film What's Up, Doc? (1972) contains the song sung by Barbra Streisand at the beginning and it as a duet between her and Ryan O'Neal at the end.
- In 1985, a series of Heinz Tomato Ketchup commercials in Canada featured various cover versions of the song as their jingle.
- In John Mortimer's novel Paradise Postponed (1985) and the television series of the same name (Euston Films, 1986): A rendering of the song by a fictitious performer, Pinky Pinkerton, includes the line, "You're my Lady Grace", which signifies Lady Grace Fanner in the story.

== Parodies ==
Porter biographer William McBrien wrote that at the height of its popularity in 1934 to 1935 it had become a "popular pastime" to create parodies of the lyrics. Porter, who himself had called the song "just a trick" the public would get bored by, was flooded with hundreds of parodies, one reportedly written by Irving Berlin. Despite the ribald nature of some of the parodies, McBrien believes a few, including a King Kong parody, were written by Porter or Berlin.
