= Paris (1928 musical) =

- Music: Cole Porter; Walter Kollo; Louis Alter
- Lyrics: Cole Porter; E. Ray Goetz; Roy Turk
- Book: Martin Brown
- Productions: 1928 Broadway

Paris is a musical with the book by Martin Brown, and music and lyrics by Cole Porter, as well as Walter Kollo and Louis Alter (music) and E. Ray Goetz and Roy Turk (lyrics). The musical, which premiered on Broadway in 1928, was Porter's first Broadway hit. The musical introduced the song "Let's Do It, Let's Fall in Love" sung by the show's star, Irene Bordoni. The story involves a young man from a very proper family in Newton, Massachusetts whose mother is horrified by his intention to wed a French actress.

== History ==
According to writer Stephen Citron in his book Noel & Cole: the Sophisticates, it was with Paris that Cole Porter would be accepted in the "upper echelon" of Broadway composers. Although it was not a revue, the critics could not find the plot. An eleven-piece orchestra was placed in the leading lady's room, singing and dancing as well as providing the orchestral accompaniment. The producer (and also songwriter) Ray Goetz kept the musical in tryouts for almost 8 months, while songs were added and deleted. The song "Let's Misbehave" was dropped in favor of one of Porter's "best known songs", "Let's Do It, Let's Fall in Love". The censors had insisted that the "Let's Fall in Love" be added to the title. The plot was designed for Irene Bordoni "to show off her wardrobe and ingratiating stage presence".

== Synopsis ==
Mrs. Cora Sabot is a domineering and haughty society matriarch who lives in Massachusetts. Her son Andrew plans on marrying the famous French stage actress Vivienne Rolland. Mrs. Sabot goes to Paris and decides that the actress is not of the caliber she wishes for her son, and therefore intends to stop the marriage. There she feigns drunkenness and fakes falling under the romantic influence of Guy Pennel, Vivienne's stage partner. However, she actually does become drunk and is comically transformed into a passionate woman. Mrs. Sabot's scheme works, and Vivienne realizes that she and Guy are meant to be romantic partners in life as well as on the stage. Andrew meanwhile understands that Brenda Kaley, as slow and obtuse as she is, will make the perfect wife.

== Songs ==
All songs are by Cole Porter (music and lyrics) unless noted.

Act I

- "The Land of Going To Be" (lyrics by E. Ray Goetz, music by Walter Kollo) – Vivienne Rolland and Guy Pennel

Act II

- "Paris" (lyrics by E. Ray Goetz, music by Louis Alter) – Vivienne Rolland
- "Babes in the Wood" – Vivienne Rolland
- "Don't Look at Me That Way" – Vivienne Rolland
- "Let's Do It, Let's Fall in Love" – Vivienne Rolland and Guy Pennel
- "The Land of Going To Be (Reprise)" – Vivienne Rolland
- "An' Furthermore" (lyrics by Bud Green, music by Harry Warren) – The Commanders
- "(Oh You) Sweet Old Whatcha-May-Call-It" (lyrics by Roy Turk, music by Fred E. Ahlert) – The Commanders

Act III

- "The Land of Going To Be (Reprise)" – Vivienne Rolland

== Productions ==
Paris started pre-Broadway tryouts at Nixon's Apollo Theatre, Atlantic City on February 6, 1928, followed by: the Adelphi Theatre, Philadelphia on February 13, 1928; the Wilbur Theatre, Boston as of May 7, 1928; and finally the Poli Theatre, Washington DC on September 30, 1928.

The Broadway premiere was at the Music Box Theatre, opening on October 8, 1928 and closing on March 23, 1929, after 195 performances. The musical was directed by William H. Gilmore with choreography by "Red" Stanley. The cast featured Goetz' wife, Irene Bordoni (Vivienne Rolland), Arthur Margetson (Guy Pennel), Louise Closser Hale (Cora Sabot), Eric Kalkhurst (Andrew Sabot), and Elizabeth Chester (Brenda Kaley). Irving Aaronson and his Commanders was the musical's band.

In 1929 Warner Brothers made the musical into a feature film, starring Bordoni, Jack Buchanan, Jason Robards Sr. and ZaSu Pitts.

In 1983, Medicine Show Theatre, one of New York City's longest running experimental theatres, re-discovered the script and, working with the Cole Porter trust, restored the cut Cole Porter songs to the show and inserted other Porter songs to make it an all-Cole Porter musical. Medicine Show revived this version in June 2011, scheduling performances through October 2011.

Ian Marshall Fisher's "Lost Musicals" series presented a staged concert in April 2010 at Sadler's Wells, London.

== See also ==
- Paris (Jon English musical)
- List of songs about Paris
