= Les Girls =

1957 film directed by George Cukor

- Theatrical release poster
- Directed by: George Cukor
- Screenplay by: John Patrick
- Story by: Vera Caspary
- Produced by: Sol C. Siegel
- Starring: Gene Kelly; Mitzi Gaynor; Kay Kendall; Taina Elg; Jacques Bergerac
- Cinematography: Robert Surtees
- Edited by: Ferris Webster
- Music by: Cole Porter
- Production company: Metro-Goldwyn-Mayer
- Distributed by: Loew's Inc.
- Release date: October 3, 1957
- Running time: 114 minutes
- Country: United States
- Languages: English; French
- Budget: $3.4 million
- Box office: $3.9 million

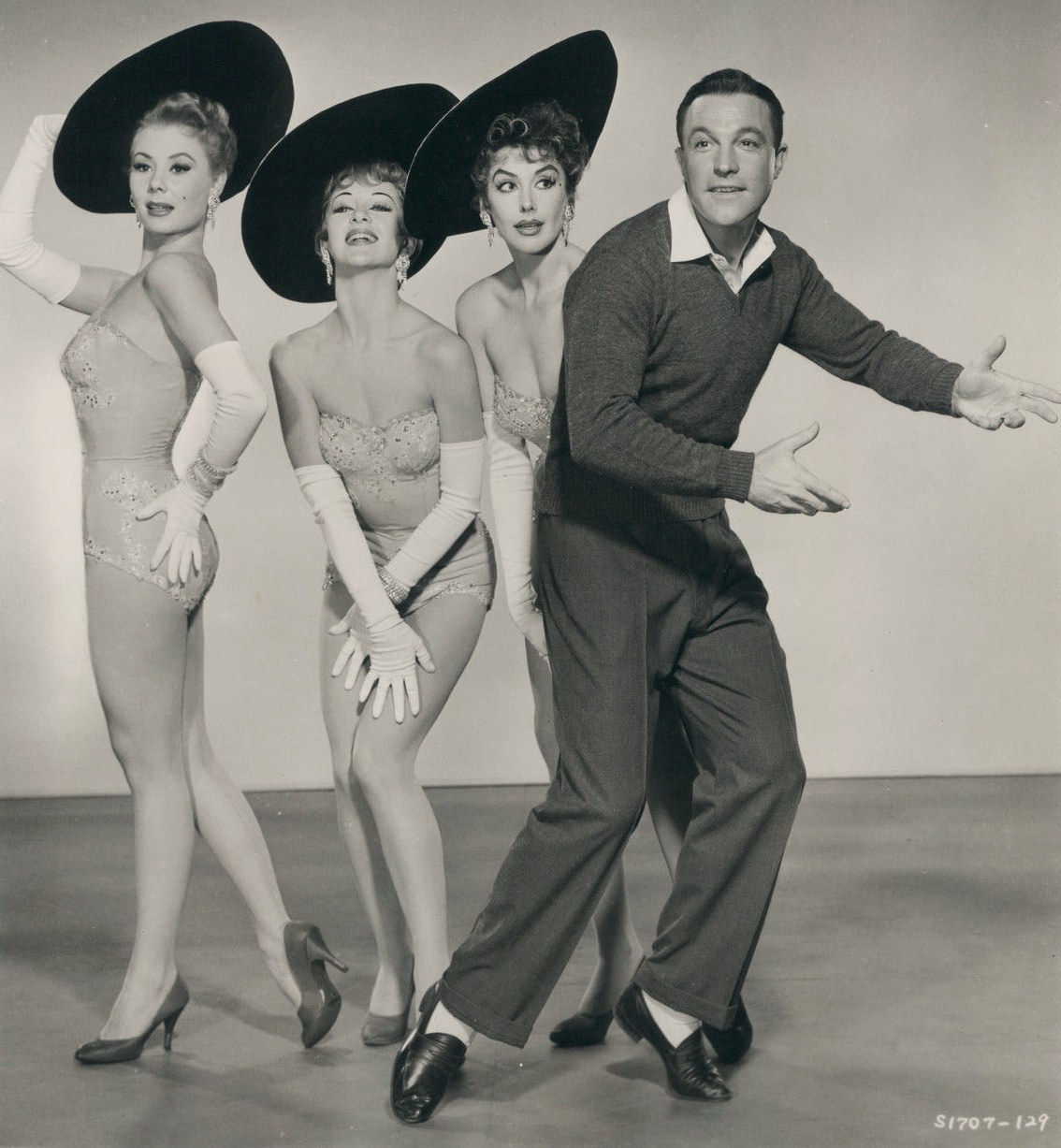
L–R: Mitzi Gaynor, Taina Elg, Kay Kendall, and Gene Kelly in Les Girls

Les Girls (also known as Cole Porter's Les Girls) is a 1957 American CinemaScope musical comedy film directed by George Cukor and produced by Sol C. Siegel, with Saul Chaplin as associate producer. The screenplay is by John Patrick and the story is by Vera Caspary. The music and lyrics are by Cole Porter.

The film stars Gene Kelly, Mitzi Gaynor, Kay Kendall, and Taina Elg, with Jacques Bergerac, Leslie Phillips, Henry Daniell, and Patrick Macnee in supporting roles.

== Plot ==
Barry Nichols, Joy Henderson, Sybil Wren, and Angèle Ducros were formerly members of the cabaret dance troupe Barry Nichols and Les Girls. Years after the group has dissolved, Sybil, now Lady Wren, publishes a tell-all memoir recounting her days with the troupe, which includes a chapter detailing Angèle's alleged suicide attempt after Barry ended their affair. Angèle, now married to French businessman Pierre Ducros, is outraged by Sybil's claims and sues her for libel. The case goes to trial at the Royal Courts of Justice in London, where the two women provide conflicting personal accounts of the events surrounding the troupe.

Sybil is the first to take the stand and present her side of the story: In 1949, after Barry hired Angèle as the third principal dancer, she moved in with Sybil and Joy in their apartment in Paris. Unbeknownst to Barry, Angèle was engaged to a young man named Pierre, who knew nothing of the troupe. Angèle and Barry soon began an affair, and while they were out one night, Pierre arrived at the apartment to surprise his fiancée, leaving Sybil and Joy to cover for Angèle.

The following night, during one of the troupe's performances, Joy claimed to notice Pierre and his parents in the audience, causing Angèle to ruin the number by trying to hide behind her fellow dancers before running off the stage. When Angèle failed to show up for a subsequent number with Barry, thus humiliating him, he angrily fired her, which left her devastated. Later that night, Sybil returned to the apartment and found Angèle unconscious from inhaling gas.

The next day in court, Angèle relates her version of the events: After discovering Sybil's drinking problem, Barry threatened to fire her until Angèle convinced him that Sybil drank because she was secretly in love with him. Flattered, Barry helped Sybil achieve sobriety and the two began an affair. While the troupe were on a European tour, Sybil was surprised by her fiancé, English businessman Gerald Wren, in Granada. Gerald offered Barry his own theater for the troupe, hoping Sybil would return to London.

That night at a flamenco club, upon learning of Sybil's affair with Barry, Gerald started a physical altercation with him. Later, Sybil attempted to apologize to Barry, who declared that he only became involved with her out of pity for her alcoholism. Back in Paris, Sybil relapsed into alcoholism and was fired by Barry after performing drunkenly on opening night. Returning to the apartment later that night, Angèle found Sybil passed out due to gas inhalation.

Finally, Barry takes the stand to reveal that neither of the women's recollections were accurate: All along, Barry had actually been pursuing the shy and wholesome Joy romantically. Pierre and Gerald asked Barry to fire Angèle and Sybil so they could marry the women, while allowing Barry to be alone with Joy. Instead of firing the women, Barry faked a terminal heart condition to gain Joy's sympathy. The three women, distraught at the sudden news, all agreed to quit for his sake. After a farewell party the women threw for Barry, Joy rejected his advances out of concern for his heart, so he admitted to the ruse. Joy stormed out of Barry's apartment in anger, and he ran after her.

Arriving at the women's apartment, Barry found Sybil and Angèle unconscious, both having accidentally been exposed to the toxic gas due to a faulty heater. After both women were hospitalized, they never saw each other again until the trial, marking the end of Les Girls. With the case now settled that there was no suicide attempt, but rather both women had misunderstood the gas leak as a suicide attempt on behalf of the other, Sybil and Angèle reconcile outside the courthouse. As Barry leaves with Joy, who is now his wife, she voices her suspicion that Sybil and Angèle did not completely invent their relationships with Barry.

== Cast ==
- Gene Kelly as Barry Nichols
- Mitzi Gaynor as Joy Henderson
- Kay Kendall as Lady Sybil Wren
  - Betty Wand provides the singing voice of Lady Sybil Wren
- Taina Elg as Angèle Ducros
- Jacques Bergerac as Pierre Ducros
- Leslie Phillips as Sir Gerald Wren
- Henry Daniell as judge
- Patrick Macnee as Sir Percy
- Stephen Vercoe as Mr. Outward
- Philip Tonge as the associate judge
- Barrie Chase as a dancer (uncredited)
- Lilyan Chauvin as a dancer (uncredited)

== Production ==
The story by Vera Caspary was inspired by an article by Constance Tomkinson that appeared in The Atlantic—a reminiscence of her time in the chorus of the Folies Bergere. Miss Caspary's version turned the memoir into a point of dispute and raised questions about the nature of truth. Because only the title was used from Tomkinson's story for the screenplay, some joked that she was the highest paid writer in the world; she was paid $80,000 for writing just two words—"Les Girls".

Les Girls was Gene Kelly's last musical under his contract with MGM (which began in 1942). It was the last film score by Cole Porter and the next-to-last score of his career. The film's original female leads were to have been played by Leslie Caron, Cyd Charisse, Jean Simmons, and Carol Haney.

Les Girls was a major vehicle for choreographer Jack Cole, and one of the first films to feature the role of choreographer in the opening credits.

== Musical numbers ==
- "Les Girls" – Barry, Joy, Sybil and Angèle
- "You're Just Too, Too" – Barry and Sybil
- "Ça, C'est L'amour" – Angèle
- "Ladies-in-Waiting" – Joy, Sybil and Angèle
- "Why Am I So Gone (About that Gal)?" – Barry

== Reception ==
=== Box office ===
According to MGM records, the film made $2,415,000 in the United States and Canada and $1,450,000 elsewhere, but because of its high production cost lost $1,635,000.

=== Awards and honors ===
- Les Girls won the Academy Award for Best Costume Design for Orry-Kelly and was nominated for two other awards, Best Art Direction (William A. Horning, Gene Allen, Edwin B. Willis, Richard Pefferle) and Best Sound (Wesley C. Miller).
- The film won the Golden Globe for Best Motion Picture – Musical/Comedy and for Best Actress, Kay Kendall and Taina Elg together.

== Sequel ==
Immediately after the film was released, tentative plans were announced for a sequel called Les Boys. While the sequel did not come to fruition, Les Girls did inspire Harry's Girls, a sitcom starring Larry Blyden that aired on NBC for 15 episodes in the fall of 1963.

== See also ==
- List of American films of 1957
