= He Goes to Church on Sunday =

Song
- Published: 1907
- Composer: E. Ray Goetz
- Lyricist: Vincent Bryan

"He Goes to Church on Sunday" is a popular song published in 1907 with lyrics by Vincent Bryan and music by E. Ray Goetz. It was first introduced by Eddie Foy in the Broadway production of the musical comedy The Orchid. The song tells the stories of men who defraud people, but are considered honest because they go to church on Sundays. However, the song doesn't appear to be a criticism of religion, and the tone of the song is humorous and light-hearted.

Billy Murray recorded at least three different versions of this song in one year, released on four different labels: Columbia Records, Standard Records, Victor Records, and Edison Records. All four recordings are in the public domain. Its popularity was attested by British children's rhymes in 1959's The Lore and Language of Schoolchildren:

Mr. MacDonald is a good man
He goes to church on Sunday.
He prays to God to give him strength
To whip the boys on Monday
