= The Night of Decision (1931 film) =

1931 film directed by Dimitri Buchowetzki

- Directed by: Dimitri Buchowetzki
- Written by: Benno Vigny
- Based on: The Virtuous Sin (screenplay) by: Martin Brown; Louise Long; The General (play) by Lajos Zilahy
- Starring: Conrad Veidt; Olga Chekhova; Peter Voß
- Cinematography: Philip Tannura
- Music by: Karl Hajos
- Production company: Les Studios Paramount
- Distributed by: Paramount Pictures
- Release date: 17 September 1931
- Country: United States
- Language: German

The Night of Decision (German: Die Nacht der Entscheidung) is a 1931 American German-language drama film directed by Dimitri Buchowetzki and starring Conrad Veidt, Olga Chekhova, and Peter Voß. Based on the 1928 play The General by Lajos Zilahy, it is also known by the alternative title of Der General. It was made at the Joinville Studios in Paris as the German-language version of the Hollywood production The Virtuous Sin. It is now considered a lost film.

== Cast ==
- Conrad Veidt as General Gregori Platoff
- Olga Chekhova as Maria Iwanowa (Marya Sablin)
- Peter Voß as Viktor Boris Sablin
- Trude Hesterberg as Madame Alexandra
- Alfons Fryland
- Erik Werntgen as Oberst Prokoff
- Emil Ritter as Velajeff
- Frédéric Mariotti

== Release ==
The film premiered in Berlin at the Gloria-Palast on May 8, 1931.

== Reception ==
The film was criticised and "in contrast to the Hollywood original" was labelled "filmed theater".

== Bibliography ==
- Soister, John T. (2002). Conrad Veidt on Screen: A Comprehensive Illustrated Filmography. Jefferson, NC: McFarland. ISBN 978-0-7864-1289-1.
