= Irving Aaronson =

American jazz pianist and big band leader (1895–1963)

Irving A. Aaronson
- Born: February 7, 1895; New York, US
- Died: March 10, 1963 (aged 68) Hollywood, California, US
- Genres: Jazz
- Occupation(s): Musician, bandleader
- Instrument: Piano

Irving A. Aaronson (February 7, 1895 – March 10, 1963) was an American jazz pianist and big band leader. Aaronson's orchestra was one of the most popular in America during the Roaring Twenties. His most popular song, "The Loveliest Night of the Year", was not recorded with his band but was adapted by Aaronson in 1950 for the Mario Lanza film The Great Caruso.

== Early life and education ==
Aaronson was born in New York, United States. He learned the piano from Alfred Sendry at the David Mannes School for music.

== Career ==
By age 11, he played accompaniment in silent movie theaters (called nickelodeons). He co-wrote a hit song, "Boo-Hoo-Hoo", in 1921. Aaronson's first band was called the Crusaders and recorded several sides for Edison Records. His band signed with the Victor label in 1926 and the band's name was changed to Irving Aaronson and his Commanders. While signed to Victor from 1926 to 1929, the band had a notable success with "Let's Misbehave" in 1927. The band appeared in the Café des Ambassadeurs in Paris in 1926 and 1927, and in Cole Porter's Broadway musical Paris, in 1928 and broadcast on KFWB, Hollywood, California, circa 1929.

In 1933, Irving Aaronson and his Commanders recorded for the Vocalion Records label. In 1934 and 1935, they recorded for the Columbia Records label. These records as have never been reissued, but some of them have been uploaded onto the Internet, including the song "Let's Be Thankful".

In 1935, Aaronson headlined the Irving Aaronson Orchestra radio program on NBC. The band toured movie theatres and ballrooms across America. Aaronson's band included at various times such musicians as Phil Saxe, Joe Gillespie, and others who would become bandleaders themselves: Artie Shaw, Gene Krupa, and Tony Pastor. Western movie actor Fuzzy Knight was a drummer with Aaronson's band in the late 1920s.

In 1939 Billy Mann, a successful investor who had been a founding member of the Yacht Club Boys musical quartet, bought the Irving Aaronson band outright. Aaronson remained as the pianist, but only briefly; in 1940, he joined the Metro-Goldwyn-Mayer film studio as a musical director. He remained in that capacity and served as assistant to producer Joe Pasternak until his death from a heart attack in 1963. Some sources suggest his retirement at age 65, others have him active until his death.

== Death ==
Aaronson died in Hollywood of a heart attack in 1963, at 68 years old. He was interred at Hillside Memorial Park Cemetery.
