= The Virtuous Sin =

1930 film

- Original poster
- Directed by: George Cukor; Louis J. Gasnier
- Written by: Martin Brown; Louise Long; Based on a play by Lajos Zilahy
- Starring: Walter Huston; Kay Francis; Kenneth MacKenna
- Cinematography: David Abel
- Edited by: Otho Lovering
- Music by: Sam Coslow; Ralph Rainger
- Distributed by: Paramount Pictures
- Release date: October 24, 1930
- Running time: 80 minutes
- Country: United States
- Language: English

The Virtuous Sin is a 1930 American pre-Code comedy-drama film directed by George Cukor and Louis J. Gasnier and starring Walter Huston, Kay Francis, and Kenneth MacKenna. The screenplay by Martin Brown and Louise Long is based on the 1928 play The General by Lajos Zilahy. A separate 1931 German-language version The Night of Decision was shot at Paramount's Joinville Studios in Paris.

== Plot ==
Marya is married to medical student Victor Sablin, who finds it impossible to deal with military life when he is inducted into the Russian army during World War I. When her husband is sentenced to death by firing squad due to his insubordination, Marya offers herself to General Gregori Platoff in order to save him. When the two unexpectedly fall in love, Victor — not caring that his life has been spared — threatens to kill his rival. His determination to eliminate the general falters when Marya confesses she is not in love with her husband — and never was.

== Cast ==
- Walter Huston as Gen. Gregori Platoff
- Kay Francis as Marya Sablin
- Kenneth MacKenna as Victor Sablin

== Critical reception ==
Mordaunt Hall of the New York Times called the film "a clever comedy with a splendid performance by Walter Huston" and added, "There is a constant fund of interest in this picture's action. It is one of those rare offerings in which youth takes a back seat.

== George Cukor's reflection in 1972 ==
In the book On Cukor, director George Cukor confided to biographer Gavin Lambert: "It wasn't much good. I'd be in great shock if they [film restorationists & historians] rescued this one. I remember that I enjoyed working with Kay Francis and Walter Huston, though."

== Preservation status ==
A complete print of this film is held by the UCLA Film and Television Archive. However, the UCLA archive's website says the print is too shrunk for projection.

== See also ==
- The Rebel (1931)
