= Cole Porter =

American composer and songwriter (1891–1964)

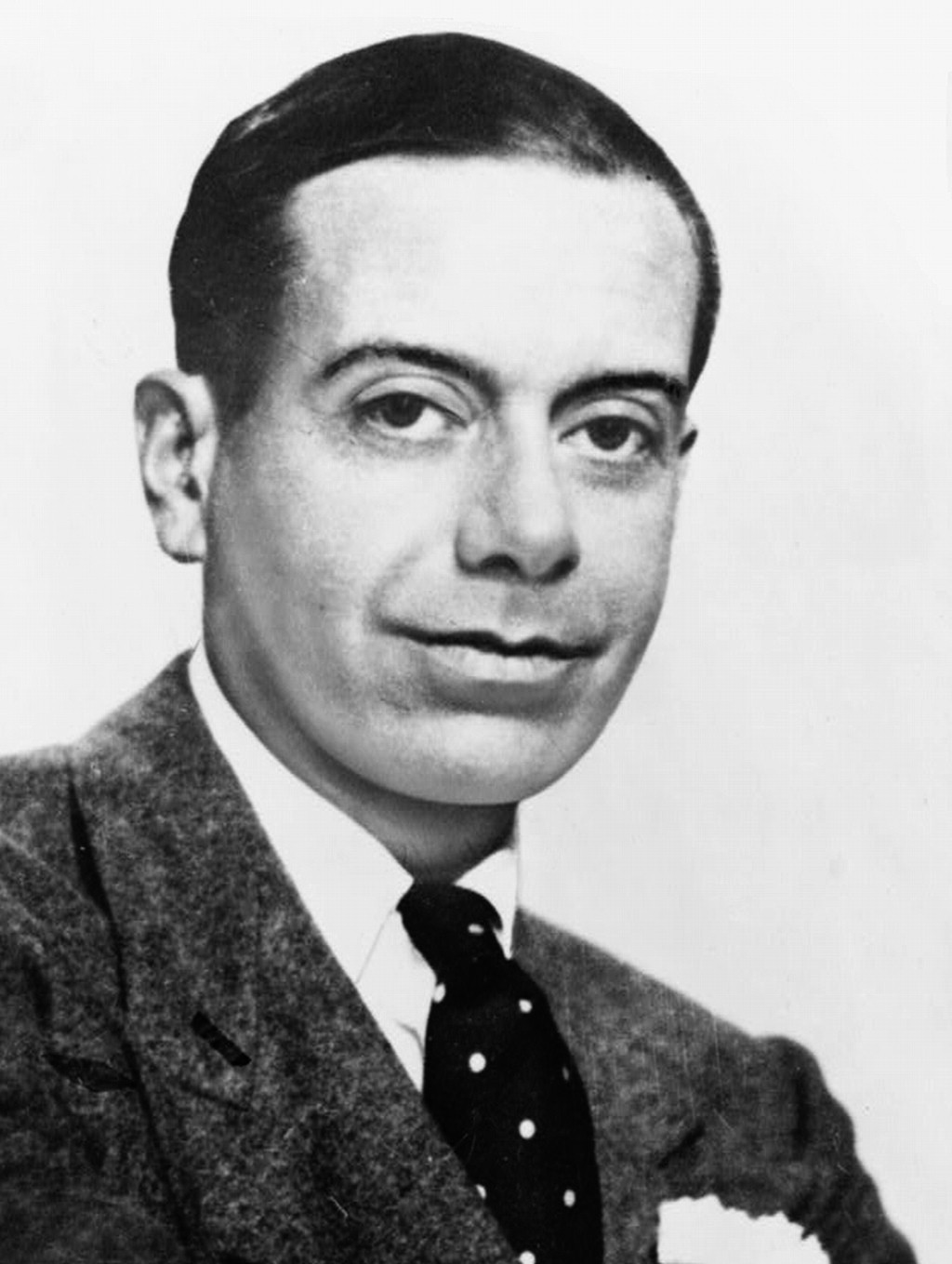
Porter in the 1930s

Cole Albert Porter (June 9, 1891 – October 15, 1964) was an American composer and songwriter. Many of his songs became standards noted for their witty, urbane lyrics, and many of his scores found success on Broadway and in Hollywood films.

Born to a wealthy family in Indiana, Porter defied his grandfather's wishes for him to practice law and took up music as a profession. Classically trained, he was drawn to musical theatre. After a slow start, he began to achieve success in the 1920s, and by the 1930s he was one of the major songwriters for the Broadway musical stage. Unlike many successful Broadway composers, Porter wrote the lyrics as well as the music for his songs.

After a serious horseback riding accident in 1937, Porter was left disabled and in constant pain, but he continued to work. His shows of the early 1940s did not contain the lasting hits of his best work of the 1920s and 1930s, but in 1948 he made a triumphant comeback with his most successful musical, Kiss Me, Kate. It won the first Tony Award for Best Musical.

Porter's other musicals include Fifty Million Frenchmen, DuBarry Was a Lady, Anything Goes, Can-Can and Silk Stockings. His hit songs include "Night and Day", "Begin the Beguine", "I Get a Kick Out of You", "Well, Did You Evah!", "I've Got You Under My Skin", "Let's Do It, Let's Fall in Love", "My Heart Belongs to Daddy" and "You're the Top". He also composed scores for films from the 1930s to the 1950s, including Born to Dance (1936), which featured the song "You'd Be So Easy to Love"; Rosalie (1937), which featured "In the Still of the Night"; High Society (1956), which included "True Love"; and Les Girls (1957) which featured "Ça, C'est L'amour".

== Life and career ==
=== Early years ===
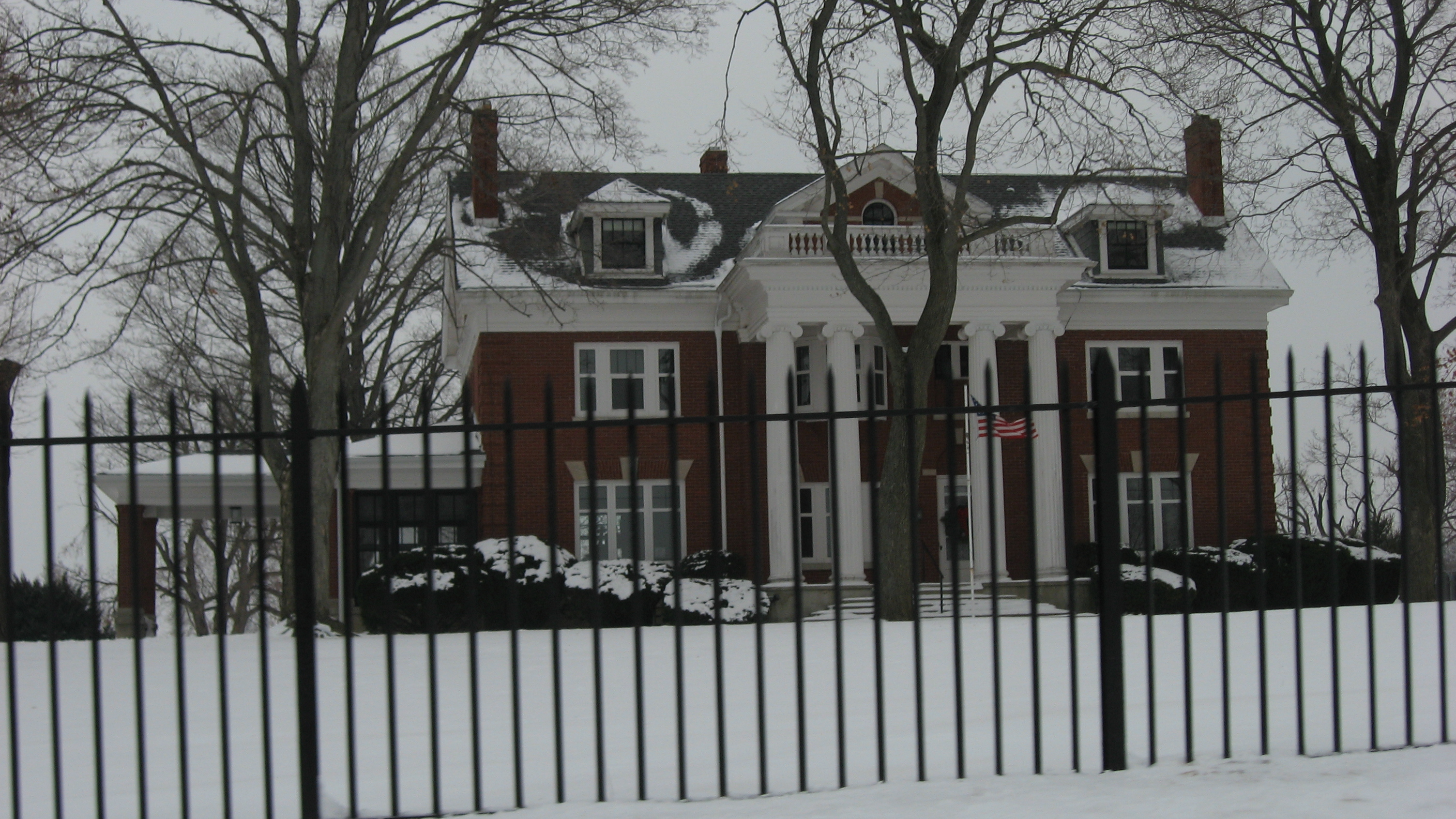
Farmhouse at Westleigh Farms

Porter was born in Peru, Indiana, on June 9, 1891, the only surviving child of a wealthy family. (Note: Porter's parents had two children who died in infancy before his birth – Louis Omar (b. and d. 1885) and Rachel (1888–90).) His father, Samuel Fenwick Porter, was a pharmacist by trade. (Note: Porter's father came to Peru, Indiana, from Vevay, Indiana. He eventually owned three drugstores in Peru.) His mother, Kate, was the indulged daughter of James Omar "J. O." Cole, "the richest man in Indiana", a coal and timber speculator who dominated the family. (Note: Porter's great-grandfather, A. A. Cole, had come to Peru, Indiana, in 1834 from Connecticut, as a child. J. O. Cole grew up in Peru but moved west during the Gold Rush of 1849. He made his fortune in California and invested it in Indiana farmland and West Virginia timber, coal, and oil.) J. O. Cole built the couple a house on his Peru-area property, known as Westleigh Farms. After high school, Porter returned to his childhood home only for occasional visits.

Porter's strong-willed mother doted on him and began his musical training at an early age. He learned the violin at age six, the piano at eight, and wrote his first operetta (with help from his mother) at ten. She falsified his recorded birth year, changing it from 1891 to 1893 to make him appear more precocious. His father, a shy and unassertive man, played a lesser role in Porter's upbringing, although as an amateur poet, he may have influenced his son's gifts for rhyme and meter. Porter's father was also a talented singer and pianist, but the father-son relationship was not close.

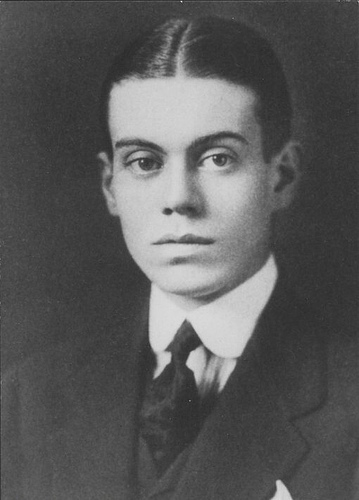
Porter as a Yale College student

J. O. Cole wanted his grandson to become a lawyer, and with that in mind, sent him to Worcester Academy in Massachusetts in 1905. Porter brought an upright piano with him to school and found that music, and his ability to entertain, made it easy for him to make friends. Porter did well in school and rarely came home to visit. He became class valedictorian and was rewarded by his grandfather with a tour of France, Switzerland and Germany. Entering Yale College in 1909, Porter majored in English, minored in music, and also studied French. He was a member of Scroll and Key and Delta Kappa Epsilon fraternity, and contributed to campus humor magazine The Yale Record. He was an early member of the Whiffenpoofs a cappella singing group and participated in several other music clubs; in his senior year, he was elected president of the Yale Glee Club and was its principal soloist.

Porter wrote 300 songs while at Yale, including student songs such as the football fight songs "Bulldog" and "Bingo Eli Yale" (aka "Bingo, That's The Lingo!") that are still played at Yale. During college, Porter became acquainted with New York City's vibrant nightlife, taking the train there for dinner, theater, and nights on the town with his classmates, before returning to New Haven, Connecticut, early in the morning. He also wrote musical comedy scores for his fraternity, the Yale Dramatic Association, and as a student at Harvard – Cora (1911), And the Villain Still Pursued Her (1912), The Pot of Gold (1912), The Kaleidoscope (1913) and Paranoia (1914) – which helped prepare him for a career as a Broadway and Hollywood composer and lyricist. After graduating from Yale, Porter enrolled in Harvard Law School in 1913, where he roomed with future Secretary of State Dean Acheson. He soon felt that he was not destined to be a lawyer, and, at the suggestion of the dean of the law school, switched to Harvard's music department, where he studied harmony and counterpoint with Pietro Yon. His mother did not object to this move, but it was kept secret from J. O. Cole.

In 1915, Porter's first song on Broadway, "Esmeralda", appeared in the revue Hands Up. The quick success was immediately followed by failure: his first Broadway production, in 1916, See America First, a "patriotic comic opera" modeled on Gilbert and Sullivan, with a book by T. Lawrason Riggs, was a flop, closing after two weeks. Porter spent the next year in New York City before going overseas during World War I.

=== World War I, Paris and marriage ===
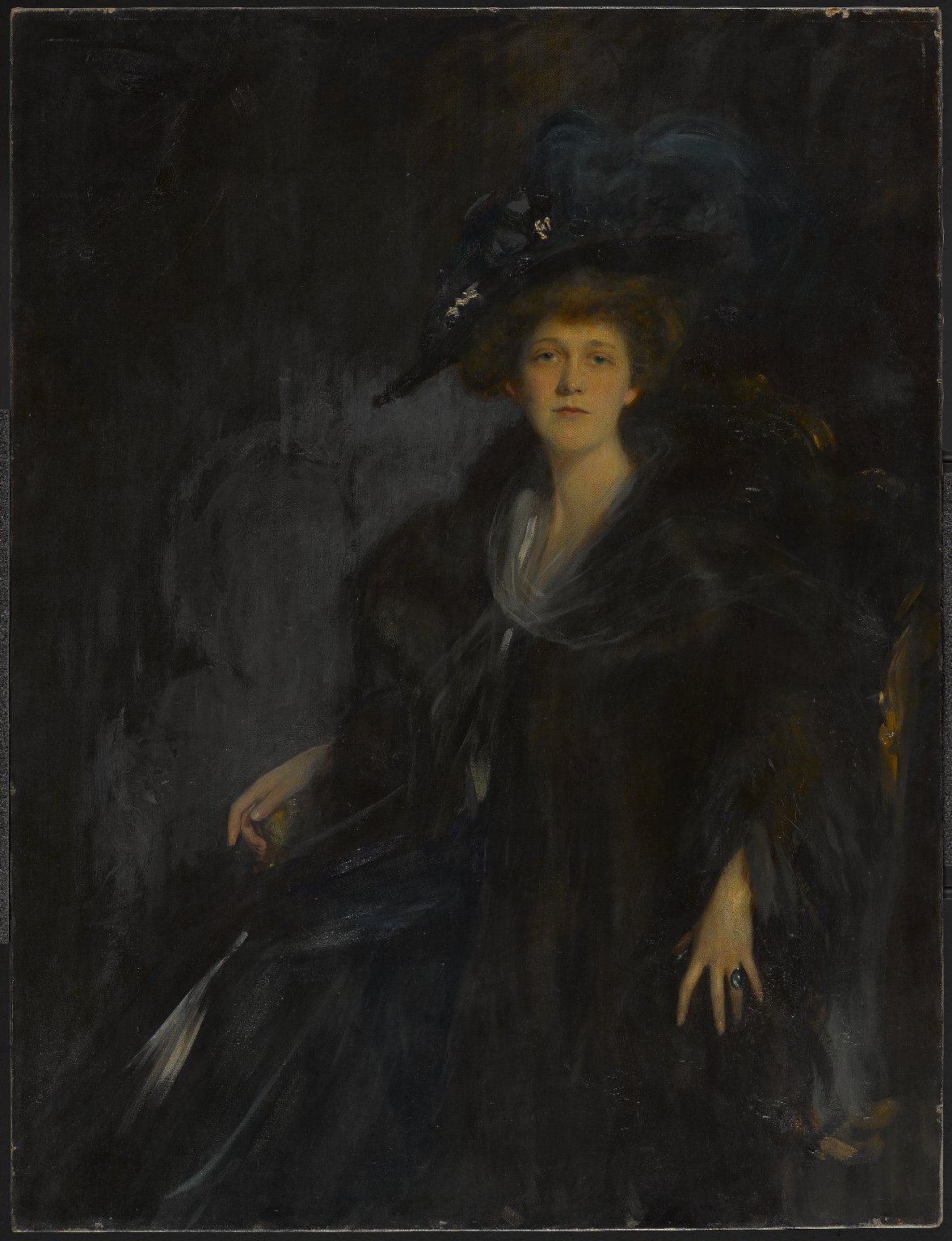
Lady in Blue, 1906 portrait of Linda Lee Thomas by Emil Fuchs

In 1917, when the United States entered World War I, Porter moved to Paris to work with the Duryea Relief organization. (Note: He subsequently enlisted in the First Foreign Regiment, before moving to other regiments prior to his April 1919 discharge.) Some writers have been skeptical about Porter's claim to have served in the French Foreign Legion, but the Legion lists Porter as one of its soldiers and displays his portrait at its museum in Aubagne. By some accounts, he served in North Africa and was transferred to the French Officers School at Fontainebleau, teaching gunnery to American soldiers. An obituary notice in The New York Times stated that, while in the Legion, "he had a specially constructed portable piano made for him so that he could carry it on his back and entertain the troops in their bivouacs." Another account, given by Porter, is that he joined the recruiting department of the American Aviation Headquarters, but, according to his biographer Stephen Citron, there is no record of his joining this or any other branch of the forces.

Porter maintained a luxury apartment in Paris, where he entertained lavishly. His parties were extravagant and scandalous, with "much gay and bisexual activity, Italian nobility, cross-dressing, international musicians and a large surplus of recreational drugs". In 1918, he met Linda Lee Thomas, a rich, Louisville, Kentucky-born divorcée eight years his senior. (Note: She divorced newspaper mogul Edward R. Thomas in 1912, receiving more than a million dollars in the divorce settlement.) She was beautiful and well-connected socially; the couple shared interests, including a love of travel, and she became Porter's confidante and companion. The couple married the next year. She was in no doubt about Porter's homosexuality, (Note: Porter had "frequent homosexual encounters") but it was mutually advantageous for them to marry. For Linda, it offered continued social status and a partner who was the antithesis of her abusive first husband. For Porter, it brought a respectable heterosexual front in an era when homosexuality was not publicly acknowledged. They were, moreover, genuinely devoted to each other and remained married from December 19, 1919, until her death in 1954. Linda remained protective of her social position and, believing that classical music might be a more prestigious outlet than Broadway for her husband's talents, tried to use her connections to find him suitable teachers, including Igor Stravinsky, but was unsuccessful. Finally, Porter enrolled at the Schola Cantorum in Paris, founded by Vincent d'Indy, where he studied orchestration and counterpoint. (Note: Some writers state that Porter studied with D'Indy himself, but William McBrien states that he did not.) Meanwhile, Porter's first big hit was the song "Old-Fashioned Garden" from the revue Hitchy-Koo of 1919. In 1920, he contributed the music of several songs to the musical A Night Out.

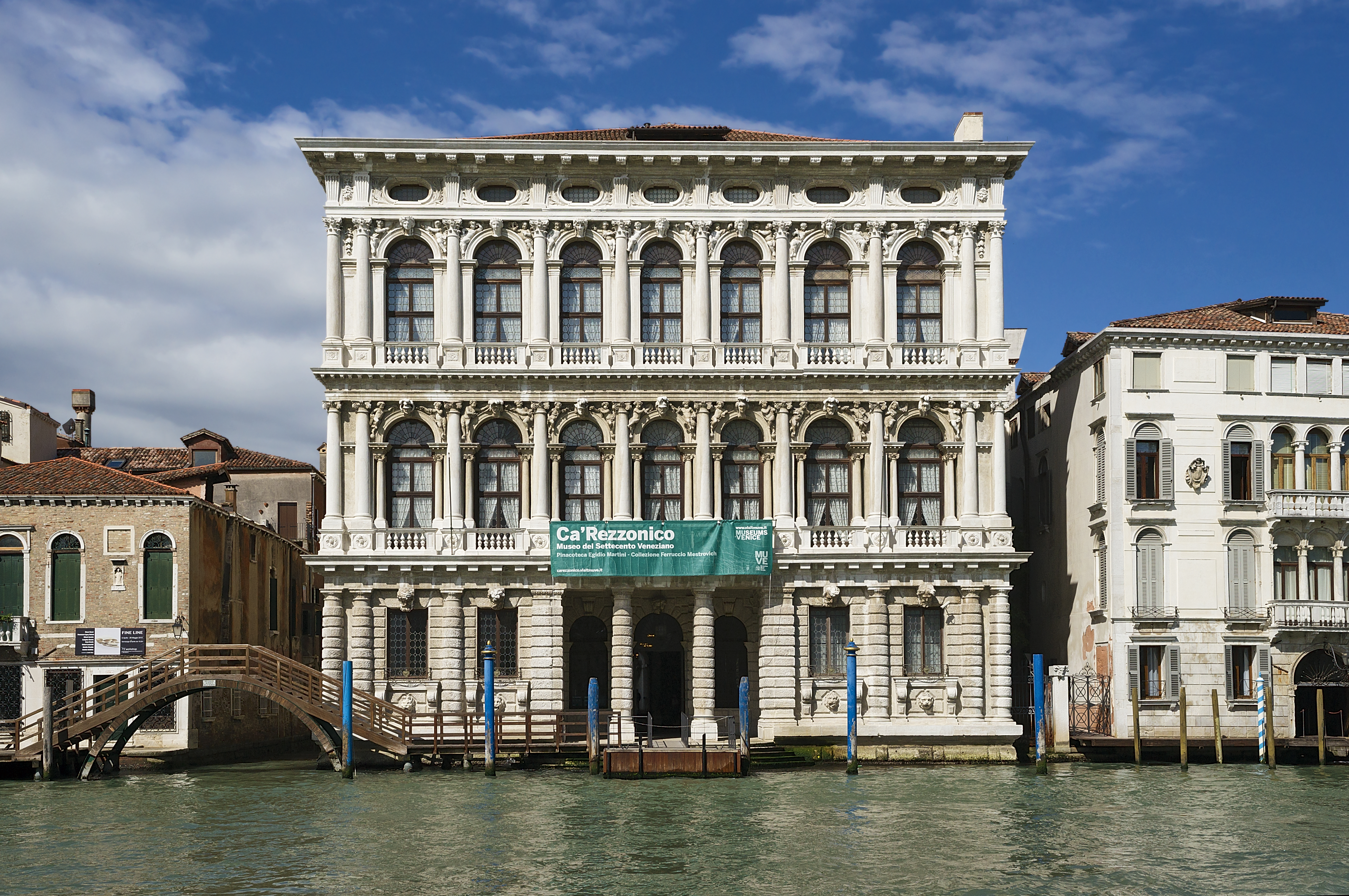
Ca' Rezzonico in Venice, leased by Porter in the 1920s

Marriage did not diminish Porter's taste for extravagant luxury. The Porter home on the rue Monsieur near Les Invalides was a palatial house with platinum wallpaper and chairs upholstered in zebra skin. In 1923, Porter came into an inheritance from his grandfather, and the Porters began living in rented palaces in Venice. He once hired the entire Ballets Russes to entertain his guests, and for a party at Ca' Rezzonico, which he rented for $4,000 a month ($76,000 in current value), he hired 50 gondoliers to act as footmen and had a troupe of tightrope walkers perform in a blaze of lights. In the midst of this extravagant lifestyle, Porter continued to write songs with his wife's encouragement.

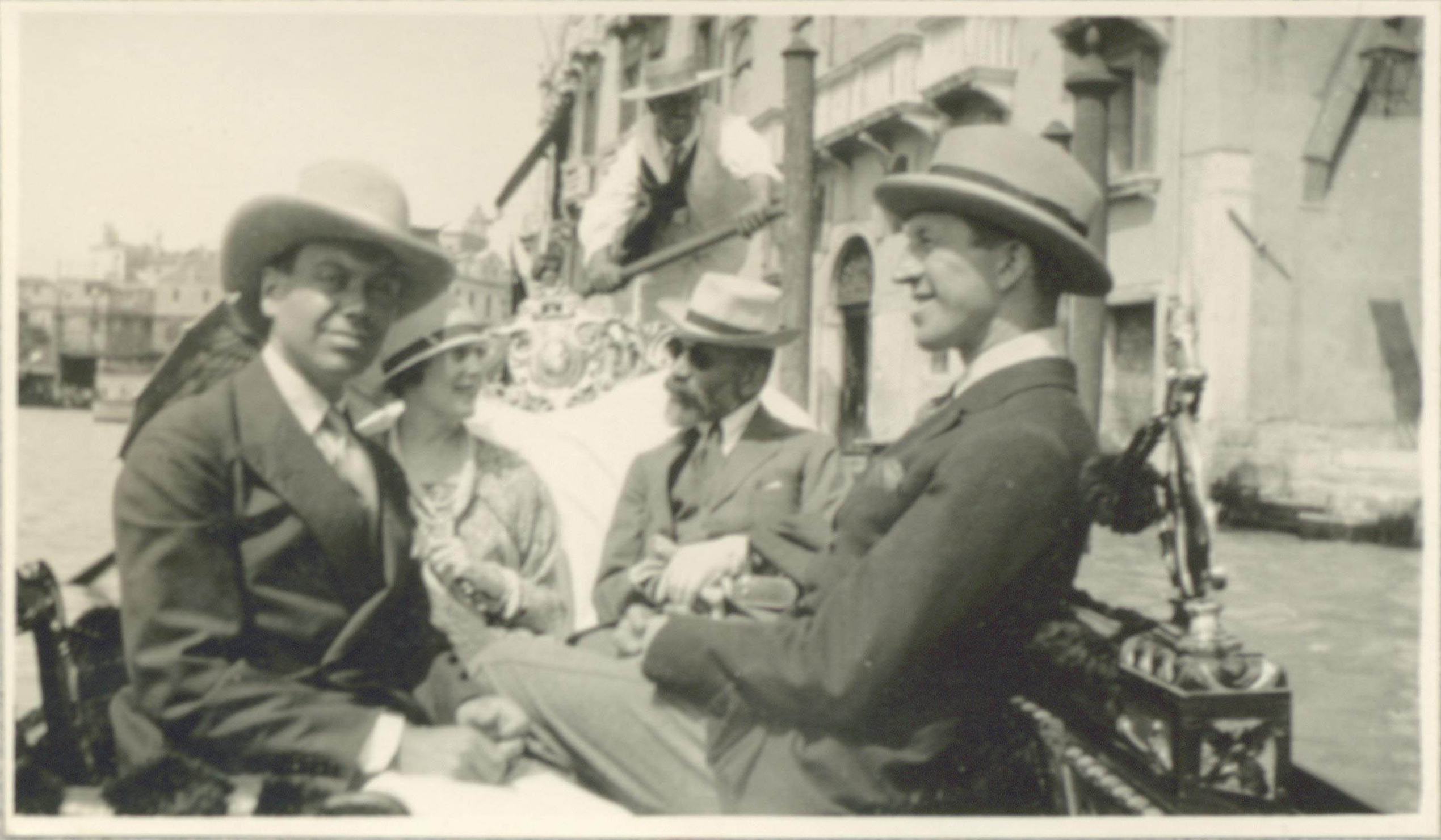
Cole Porter, Linda Lee Thomas, Bernard Berenson, and Howard Sturges in gondola, 1923

Porter received few commissions for songs in the years immediately after his marriage. He had the occasional number interpolated into other writers' revues in Britain and the U.S. For a C. B. Cochran show in 1921, he had two successes with the comedy numbers "The Blue Boy Blues" and "Olga, Come Back to the Volga". In 1923, in collaboration with Gerald Murphy, he composed a short ballet, originally titled Landed and then Within the Quota, satirically depicting the adventures of an immigrant to America who becomes a film star. The work, written for the Ballets suédois, lasts about 16 minutes. It was orchestrated by Charles Koechlin and shared the same opening night as Milhaud's La création du monde. Porter's work was one of the earliest symphonic jazz-based compositions, predating George Gershwin's Rhapsody in Blue by four months, and was well received by both French and American reviewers after its premiere at the Théâtre des Champs-Élysées in October 1923. (Note: The British classical music journal The Musical Times commented, "There was plenty of excitement of a certain kind – at least for the more excitable spectators".)

The next month, the Ballets suédois toured the work in the U.S., performing it 69 times. Reviews of the inaugural performance in New York were mixed; critics found the work to be too much like Milhaud and not American enough. A year later the company disbanded, and the score was lost until it was reconstructed from Porter's and Koechlin's manuscripts between 1966 and 1990, with help from Milhaud and others. Porter had even less success with his work on The Greenwich Village Follies (1924). He wrote most of the original score, but his songs were gradually dropped during the Broadway run, and by the time of the post-Broadway tour in 1925, all his numbers had been deleted. Frustrated by the public response to these works, Porter nearly gave up songwriting as a career, although he continued to compose songs for friends and perform at private parties.

=== Broadway and West End success ===
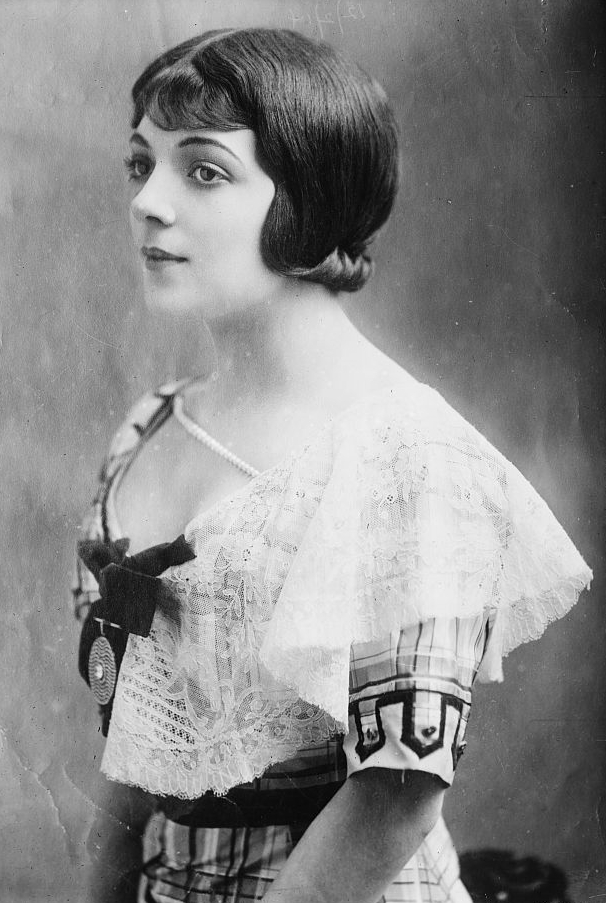
Irène Bordoni, star of Porter's Paris

At the age of 36, Porter reintroduced himself to Broadway in 1928 with the musical Paris, his first hit. It was commissioned by E. Ray Goetz at the instigation of Goetz's wife and the show's star, Irène Bordoni. She had wanted Rodgers and Hart to write the songs, but they were unavailable, and Porter's agent persuaded Goetz to hire Porter instead. In August 1928, Porter's work on the show was interrupted by the death of his father. He hurried back to Indiana to comfort his mother before returning to work. The songs written for the show included "Let's Misbehave", which was dropped before the show opened in New York, and one of Porter's best-known list songs, "Let's Do It, Let's Fall in Love", which replaced "Let's Misbehave" and was introduced by Bordoni and Arthur Margetson. The show opened on Broadway on October 8, 1928. The Porters did not attend the first night because Porter was in Paris supervising another show for which he had been commissioned, La Revue des Ambassadeurs at the Les Ambassadeurs music hall. This was also a success, and, in Citron's phrase, Porter was finally "accepted into the upper echelon of Broadway songwriters". Cochran now wanted more from Porter than isolated extra songs; he planned a West End extravaganza similar to Ziegfeld's shows, with a Porter score and a large international cast led by Jessie Matthews, Sonnie Hale and Tilly Losch. The revue, Wake Up and Dream, ran for 263 performances in London, after which Cochran transferred it to New York in 1929. On Broadway, business was badly affected by the 1929 Wall Street crash, (Note: The Porters were not greatly affected by the crash, having their assets in safe investments and held in a number of foreign banks, which remained solvent.) and the production ran for only 136 performances. From Porter's point of view, it was nonetheless a success, as his song "What Is This Thing Called Love?" became immensely popular. Porter's new fame brought him offers from Hollywood, but because his score for Paramount's The Battle of Paris was undistinguished, and its star, Gertrude Lawrence, was miscast, the film was not a success. Citron expresses the view that Porter was not interested in cinema and "noticeably wrote down for the movies."

Still on a Gallic theme, Porter's last Broadway show of the 1920s was Fifty Million Frenchmen (1929), for which he wrote 28 numbers, including "You Do Something to Me", "You've Got That Thing" and "The Tale of the Oyster". The show received mixed notices. One critic wrote, "the lyrics alone are enough to drive anyone but P. G. Wodehouse into retirement", but others dismissed the songs as "pleasant" and "not an outstanding hit song in the show". As it was a lavish and expensive production, nothing less than full houses would suffice, and after only three weeks, the producers announced that they would close it. Irving Berlin, who admired and championed Porter, took out a paid press advertisement calling the show "The best musical comedy I've heard in years. ... One of the best collections of song numbers I have ever listened to". This saved the show, which ran for 254 performances, considered a successful run at the time.

=== 1930s ===
Ray Goetz, producer of Paris and Fifty Million Frenchmen, the success of which had kept him solvent when other producers were bankrupted by the post-crash slump in Broadway business, invited Porter to write a musical show about the other city that he knew and loved: New York. Goetz offered the team with whom Porter had last worked: Herbert Fields writing the book and Porter's old friend Monty Woolley directing. (Note: Woolley was a longstanding Yale friend of Porter's, and the two shared many adventures, pranks, foreign trips and professional connections together.) The New Yorkers (1930) acquired instant notoriety for including a song about a streetwalker, "Love for Sale". Originally performed by Kathryn Crawford in a street setting, critical disapproval led Goetz to reassign the number to Elisabeth Welch in a nightclub scene. The lyric was considered too explicit for radio at the time, though it was recorded and aired as an instrumental and rapidly became a standard. Porter often referred to it as his favorite of his songs. The New Yorkers also included the hit "I Happen to Like New York".

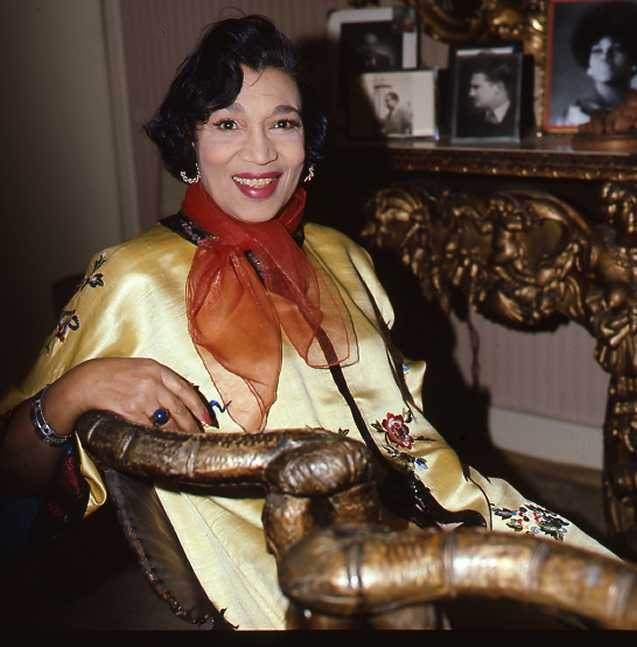
Elisabeth Welch starred in Porter's The New Yorkers and Nymph Errant.

Next came Fred Astaire's last stage show, Gay Divorce (1932). It featured a hit that became Porter's best-known song, "Night and Day". (Note: In 1999, Matthew Shaftel wrote, "Less than two months after the show's opening ... the song was featured on two best-selling recordings and was at the top of sheet music sales. Since then, 83 artists have registered with the [ASCAP] ... to legally perform and record "Night and Day". [Even] today, more than 65 years after its composition, the song earns a stunning six figures, making it Warner Brothers' "crown jewel", and placing it on ASCAP's list of top money-earners of all time.) Despite mixed press (some critics were reluctant to accept Astaire without his previous partner, his sister Adele), the show ran for a profitable 248 performances, and the rights to the film, retitled The Gay Divorcee, were sold to RKO Pictures. (Note: The film version, starring Astaire and Ginger Rogers dropped all of Porter's score except "Night and Day") Porter followed this with a West End show for Gertrude Lawrence, Nymph Errant (1933), presented by Cochran at the Adelphi Theatre, where it ran for 154 performances. Among the songs Porter composed for the show were "Experiment" and "The Physician" for Lawrence, and "Solomon" for Elisabeth Welch.

In 1934, producer Vinton Freedley came up with a new approach to producing musicals. Instead of commissioning book, music and lyrics and then casting the show, Freedley sought to create an ideal musical with stars and writers all engaged from the outset. The stars he wanted were Ethel Merman, William Gaxton and comedian Victor Moore. He planned a story about a shipwreck and a desert island, and for the book he turned to P. G. Wodehouse and Guy Bolton. For the songs, he decided on Porter. By telling each of these that he had already signed the others, Freedley gathered his ideal team together. (Note: Freedley told Bolton and Wodehouse that he had secured Merman, then contacted Gaxton, Moore, and finally Merman.) A drastic last-minute rewrite was necessitated by a major shipping accident that dominated the news and made Bolton and Wodehouse's book seem tasteless. (Note: In 1934, the S.S. Morro Castle caught fire off the New Jersey shore, killing more than 100 people. Bolton and Wodehouse were by then engaged in other work, and Howard Lindsay and Russel Crouse rewrote the book almost completely.) Nevertheless, the show, Anything Goes, was an immediate hit. Porter wrote what many consider his greatest score of this period. (Note: Anything Goes was orchestrated by Robert Russell Bennett and Hans Spialek.) The New Yorker magazine's review said, "Mr. Porter is in a class by himself", and Porter subsequently called it one of his two perfect shows, along with the later Kiss Me, Kate. Its songs include "I Get a Kick Out of You", "All Through the Night", "You're the Top" (one of his best-known list songs), and "Blow, Gabriel, Blow", as well as the title number. The show ran for 420 performances in New York (a particularly long run in the 1930s) and 261 in London. Now at the height of his success, Porter was able to enjoy the opening night of his musicals; he made grand entrances and sat in front, apparently relishing the show as much as any audience member. Russel Crouse commented "Cole's opening-night behaviour is as indecent as that of a bridegroom who has a good time at his own wedding."

Anything Goes was the first of five Porter shows featuring Merman. He loved her loud, brassy voice and wrote many numbers that displayed her strengths. Jubilee (1935), written with Moss Hart while on a cruise around the world, was not a major hit, running for only 169 performances, but it featured two songs that have since become standards, "Begin the Beguine" and "Just One of Those Things". Red, Hot and Blue (1936), featuring Merman, Jimmy Durante and Bob Hope, ran for 183 performances and introduced "It's De-Lovely", "Down in the Depths (on the Ninetieth Floor)", and "Ridin' High". The relative failure of these shows convinced Porter that his songs did not appeal to a broad enough audience. In an interview, he said "Sophisticated allusions are good for about six weeks ... more fun, but only for myself and about eighteen other people, all of whom are first-nighters anyway. Polished, urbane and adult playwriting in the musical field is strictly a creative luxury."

Porter also wrote for Hollywood in the mid-1930s. His scores include those for the Metro-Goldwyn-Mayer films Born to Dance (1936), with James Stewart, featuring "You'd Be So Easy to Love" and "I've Got You Under My Skin", and Rosalie (1937), featuring "In the Still of the Night". He wrote the score of the short film Paree, Paree, in 1935, using some of the songs from Fifty Million Frenchmen. Porter also composed the cowboy song "Don't Fence Me In" for Adios, Argentina, an unproduced movie, in 1934, but it did not become a hit until Roy Rogers sang it in the 1944 film Hollywood Canteen. Bing Crosby, The Andrews Sisters, and other artists also popularized it in the 1940s. The Porters moved to Hollywood in December 1935, but Porter's wife did not like the movie environment, and Porter's closeted homosexual acts, formerly very discreet, became less so; she retreated to their Paris house. When his film assignment on Rosalie was finished in 1937, Porter hastened to Paris to make peace with Linda, but she remained cool. After a walking tour of Europe with his friends, Porter returned to New York in October 1937 without her. They were soon reunited by an accident Porter suffered.

On October 24, 1937, Porter was riding with Countess Edith di Zoppola and Duke Fulco di Verdura at Piping Rock Club in Locust Valley, New York, when his horse rolled on him and crushed his legs, leaving him substantially crippled and in constant pain for the rest of his life. Though doctors told Porter's wife and mother that his right leg would have to be amputated, and possibly the left one as well, he refused to have the procedure. Linda rushed from Paris to be with him, and supported him in his refusal of amputation. He remained in the hospital for seven months before being allowed to go home to his apartment at the Waldorf Towers. (Note: Linda, appraising the deteriorating political outlook in Europe, closed the Paris house in April 1939.) He resumed work as soon as he could, finding it took his mind off his perpetual pain.

Porter's first show after his accident was not a success. You Never Know (1938), starring Clifton Webb, Lupe Vélez and Libby Holman, ran for only 78 performances. The score included the songs "From Alpha to Omega" and "At Long Last Love". He returned to success with Leave It to Me! (1938); the show introduced Mary Martin, singing "My Heart Belongs to Daddy", and other numbers included "Most Gentlemen Don't Like Love" and "From Now On". Porter's last show of the 1930s was DuBarry Was a Lady (1939), a particularly risqué show starring Merman and Bert Lahr. After a pre-Broadway tour, during which it ran into trouble with Boston censors, it achieved 408 performances, beginning at the 46th Street Theatre. The score included "But in the Morning, No" (which was banned from the airwaves), "Do I Love You?", "Well, Did You Evah!", "Katie Went to Haiti" and another of Porter's up-tempo list songs, "Friendship". At the end of 1939, Porter contributed six songs to the film Broadway Melody of 1940 for Fred Astaire, George Murphy and Eleanor Powell.

Meanwhile, as war became imminent in Europe, Porter's wife closed their Paris house in 1939, and the next year bought a country home in the Berkshire mountains, near Williamstown, Massachusetts, which she decorated with elegant furnishings from their Paris home. Porter spent time in Hollywood, New York and Williamstown.

=== 1940s and postwar ===
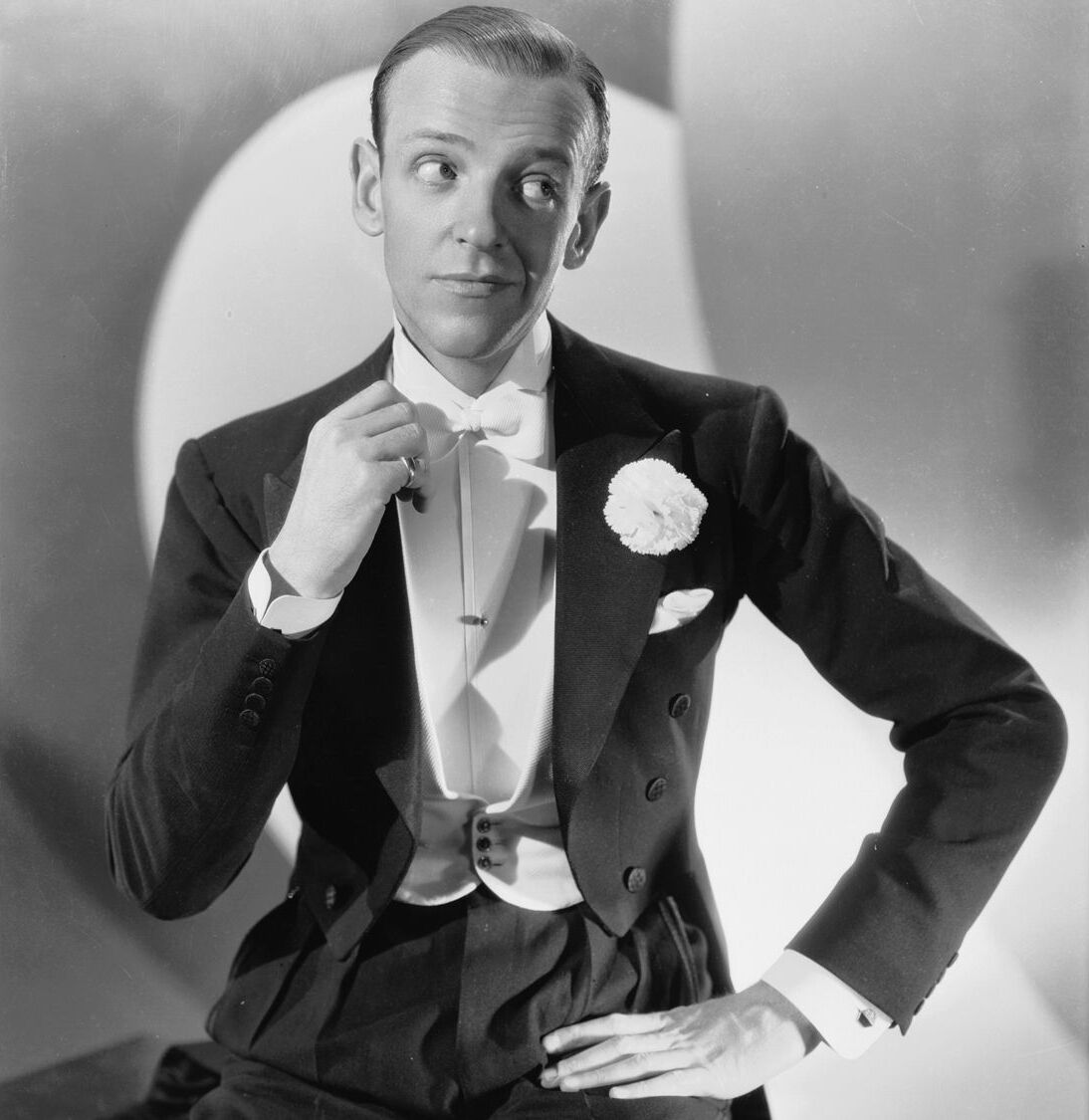
Fred Astaire in You'll Never Get Rich

Panama Hattie (1940) was Porter's longest-running hit so far, running in New York for 501 performances despite the absence of any enduring Porter songs. It starred Merman, Arthur Treacher and Betty Hutton. Let's Face It! (1941), starring Danny Kaye, had an even better run, with 547 performances in New York. This, too, lacked any numbers that became standards, and Porter always counted it among his lesser efforts. Something for the Boys (1943), starring Merman, ran for 422 performances, and Mexican Hayride (1944), starring Bobby Clark, with June Havoc, ran for 481 performances. These shows, too, are short of Porter standards. The critics did not pull their punches, complaining about the lack of hit tunes and the generally low standard of the scores. After two flops, Seven Lively Arts (1944) (which featured the standard "Ev'ry Time We Say Goodbye") and Around the World (1946), many thought that Porter's best period was over.

Between Broadway musicals, Porter continued to write for Hollywood. His film scores of this period were You'll Never Get Rich (1941) with Astaire and Rita Hayworth, Something to Shout About (1943) with Don Ameche, Janet Blair and William Gaxton, and Mississippi Belle (1943–44), which was abandoned before filming began. He also cooperated in the making of the film Night and Day (1946), a largely fictional biography of Porter, with Cary Grant implausibly cast in the lead. The critics scoffed, but the film was a huge success, chiefly because of the wealth of vintage Porter numbers in it. The biopic's success contrasted starkly with the failure of Vincente Minnelli's film The Pirate (1948), with Judy Garland and Gene Kelly, in which five new Porter songs received little attention.

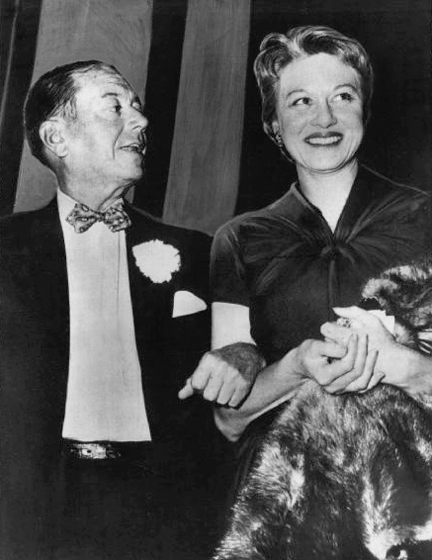
Porter and Jean Howard in early 1954

From this low spot, Porter made a conspicuous comeback in 1948 with Kiss Me, Kate. It was by far his most successful show, running for 1,077 performances in New York and 400 in London. The production won the Tony Award for Best Musical (the first Tony awarded in that category), and Porter won for best composer and lyricist. The score includes "Another Op'nin', Another Show", "Wunderbar", "So In Love", "We Open in Venice", "Tom, Dick or Harry", "I've Come to Wive It Wealthily in Padua", "Too Darn Hot", "Always True to You (in My Fashion)", and "Brush Up Your Shakespeare".

Porter began the 1950s with Out of This World (1950), which had some good numbers but too much camp and puerile humor, and was not greatly successful. His next show, Can-Can (1952), featuring "C'est Magnifique" and "It's All Right with Me", was another hit, running for 892 performances. The soundtrack from Can-Can's film adaptation won the 1960 Grammy Award for Best Sound Track Album. Porter's last original Broadway production, Silk Stockings (1955), featuring "All of You", was also successful, with a run of 477 performances. Porter wrote two more film scores and music for a television special before ending his Hollywood career. The film High Society (1956), starring Bing Crosby, Frank Sinatra and Grace Kelly, included Porter's last major hit song "True Love". It was adapted as a stage musical of the same name. Porter also wrote numbers for the film Les Girls (1957), which starred Gene Kelly. His final score was for the CBS television special Aladdin (1958).

=== Last years ===
Porter's mother died in 1952, and Linda died of emphysema in 1954. By 1958, Porter's injuries caused a series of ulcers on his right leg. After 34 operations, it was amputated and replaced with an artificial limb on April 3, 1958. His friend Noël Coward visited him in the hospital and wrote in his diary, "The lines of ceaseless pain have been wiped from his face ... I am convinced that his whole life will cheer up and that his work will profit accordingly." In fact, Porter never wrote another song after the amputation and spent the remaining six years of his life in relative seclusion, seeing few visitors. He continued to live in the Waldorf Towers in New York in his memorabilia-filled apartment. On weekends, he often visited his estate in the Berkshires, and he stayed in California during the summers.

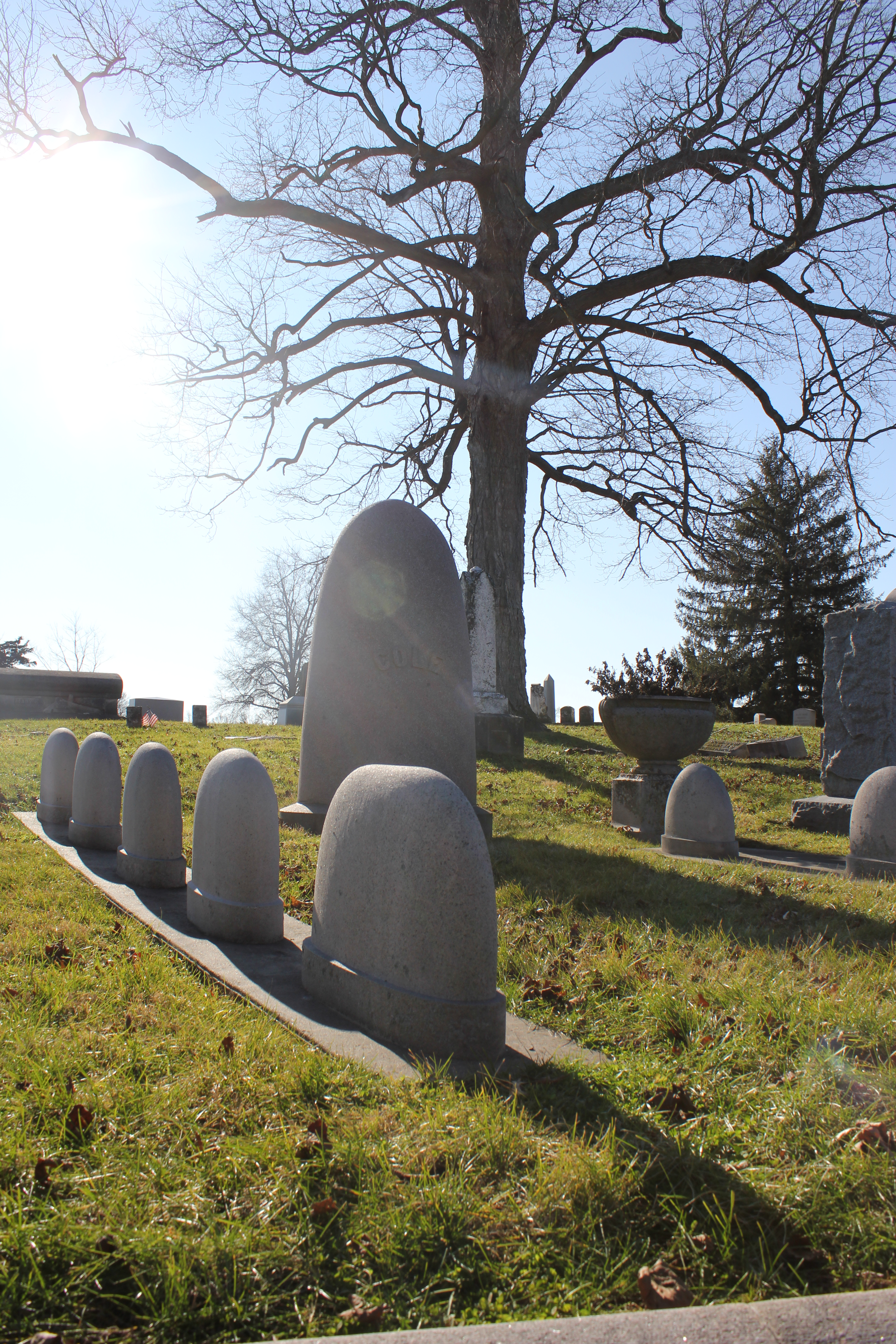
Porter family gravesite in Peru, Indiana

Porter died of kidney failure at age 73 on October 15, 1964, in Santa Monica, California. He is interred in Mount Hope Cemetery in his native Peru, Indiana, between his wife and father.

== Musical style ==
Porter wrote both the music and lyrics of his songs. But he did not write the books of the shows, or the screenplays, in which his songs appeared. Nor, except in Kiss Me Kate, did he tailor his songs to the shows in which they appeared. For Porter, plot was only "a convenient clothesline on which to hang his songs", and he stated in his will that any of his songs could be used in any of his shows. Not needing to accommodate plots or songwriting partners, his recognizable style remained much the same throughout his career.

His lyrics are often about people like himself, upper-class people in elegant or exotic settings: penthouses, cruise ships or foreign countries. He was educated, sophisticated, witty, and an outstanding rhymer. He was a modern master of the list song, such as "Let's Do It" and "You're the Top", but also wrote sentimental ballads that were intensely sincere, sometimes too much so for critics. He was more often risqué than other mainstream songwriters of his time, even using single entendres.

Though he had more formal training in composition than his peers, Porter abandoned "serious" music after his efforts composing for ballet gained him little. Despite his studies in orchestration, he hired other composers to orchestrate his scores for his shows, films, (Note: Orchestrators of Porter's shows included Robert Russell Bennett, Hans Spialek, Maurice B. DePackh, Walter Paul, Don Walker and Philip J. Lang.) and even his wholly instrumental music for Within the Quota, but he reviewed and edited their work. After he wrote a melody and lyrics, a musical secretary would help him harmonize and notate it, but he actively participated in that process and knew what he wanted.

Porter used chromaticism extensively in both melody and harmony. Early in his career, Porter told Richard Rodgers that he intended to write "Jewish tunes"; Rodgers later noted, in that connection, Porter's chromaticism and "unmistakably Mediterranean" use of minor keys. Porter sometimes drew on other foreign musical traditions to match his songs' exotic settings: he often used Latin American rhythms and claimed that "Night and Day" was inspired by a chant heard in Morocco, whereas "Begin the Beguine" was inspired by a native dance in the Dutch East Indies, though these stories' details varied.

== Tributes and legacy ==
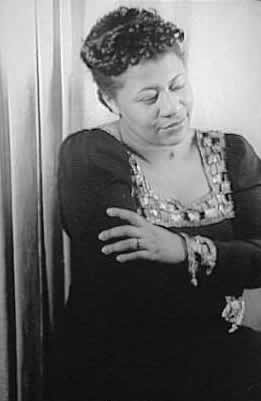
Ella Fitzgerald in 1940

Many artists have recorded Porter songs, and dozens have released entire albums of his songs. The first prominent artist to do so was Crosby in Bing Crosby Sings Cole Porter Songs (1950), followed in 1956 by Ella Fitzgerald in Ella Fitzgerald Sings the Cole Porter Songbook. In 1972, she released another collection, Ella Loves Cole. Others who recorded all-Porter albums include Oscar Peterson, Anita O'Day, Julie London, Frank Sinatra, Rosemary Clooney, Stephane Grappelli and Yo-Yo Ma, Dionne Warwick and Tony Bennett and Lady Gaga. In 1990, Red Hot + Blue, released to benefit AIDS research, featured 20 Cole Porter songs recorded by artists such as U2 and Annie Lennox.

In 1965, shortly after Porter's death, Judy Garland performed a medley of Porter's songs at the 37th Academy Awards. Porter received a Grammy Trustees Award in 1989. Numerous ensembles have paid tribute to Porter since his death, including the National Symphony Orchestra in 2005; the Yale Concert Band in 2010; the Seattle Symphony Orchestra, with Marvin Hamlisch as conductor, in 2011; the Boston Pops in 2011 and 2012; and the Dallas Symphony Orchestra, with Hamlisch and Michael Feinstein, in 2012. In 1980, Porter's music was used for the score of the musical Happy New Year. The cast of The Carol Burnett Show paid tribute to Porter in two different episodes of the series. The Swedish pop music group Gyllene Tider recorded the song "Flickan i en Cole Porter-sång" ("That Girl from the Cole Porter Song") in 1982. David Byrne mentioned Porter in his 1989 song "The Call of the Wild", as did Mercury Rev in its 1998 song "Tonite It Shows".

Porter's life has been dramatized several times. The biographical show Cole, by Alan Strachan and Benny Green, featuring Porter hits, ran in 1974 at London's Mermaid Theatre. In contrast to the highly embellished 1946 screen biography Night and Day, Porter's life was chronicled more realistically in De-Lovely, a 2004 Irwin Winkler film starring Kevin Kline as Porter and Ashley Judd as Linda. De-Lovely's soundtrack includes Porter songs sung by Alanis Morissette, Sheryl Crow, Elvis Costello, Diana Krall and Natalie Cole, among others. Porter is also a character in Woody Allen's 2011 film Midnight in Paris.

Many events commemorated the centenary of Porter's birth, including the halftime show of the 1991 Orange Bowl. Joel Grey and a large cast of singers, dancers and marching bands performed a tribute to Porter in Miami, Florida, during the 57th King Orange Jamboree parade, whose theme was "Anything Goes". The Indianapolis Symphony Orchestra performed a program of Cole Porter music at the Circle Theatre in Indianapolis. "A Gala Birthday Concert" was held at New York City's Carnegie Hall, with more than 40 entertainers and friends paying tribute to Porter's long career in theater and film. The Indiana University Opera performed Porter's musical Jubilee in Bloomington, Indiana. You're the Top: The Cole Porter Story, a video of archival material and interviews, and Red, Hot and Blue, a video of artists performing Porter's music, were released. In addition, the U.S. Postal Service issued a commemorative postage stamp honoring Porter's birth.

In May 2007, a star on the Hollywood Walk of Fame was dedicated to Porter. In December 2010, his portrait was added to the Hoosier Heritage Gallery in the office of the Governor of Indiana. In 2014, Porter was honored with a plaque on the Legacy Walk in Chicago, which celebrates LGBT achievers. Porter is a member of the Songwriters Hall of Fame, the American Theater Hall of Fame and the Great American Songbook Hall of Fame, which recognized his "musically complex [songs] with witty, urbane lyrics".

The Cole Porter Festival is held every year in June in his hometown of Peru, Indiana, to foster music and art appreciation. Porter's birthplace, restored to its 1891 appearance, is now an inn with suites named for him and his works. Costumed singers in the cabaret-style Cole Porter Room at the Indiana Historical Society's Eugene and Marilyn Glick Indiana History Center in Indianapolis take requests from visitors and perform Porter's hit songs. (Note: The setting is designed to evoke the Waldorf Astoria New York, where Porter lived from 1934 until his death.) Since Porter's death, except for a brief time at the New York Historical Society, his 1908 Steinway grand piano, which he had used when composing since the mid-1930s, has been displayed and often played in the lobby of the Waldorf-Astoria Hotel.

== Notable shows and songs ==
Dates, shows and songs are given in Robert Kimball's The Complete Lyrics of Cole Porter. Shows listed are stage musicals unless otherwise noted:

- (1910) "Bingo Eli Yale" (Porter's first Yale football song, still sung today)
- (1911) "Bull Dog" (the official Yale fight song)
- (1916) See America First (Porter's first Broadway show)
- (1919) Hitchy-Koo of 1919 – "Old-Fashioned Garden" (Porter's first hit)
- (1927) "The Laziest Gal in Town" (made famous by Marlene Dietrich in the 1950 film Stage Fright)
- (1927) "Let's Misbehave" (used in Paris, but cut before the New York opening)
- (1928) Paris (adapted to film in 1929) – "Let's Do It, Let's Fall in Love"
- (1929) Wake Up and Dream – "What Is This Thing Called Love?"
- (1929) Fifty Million Frenchmen – "You Do Something to Me"
- (1930) The New Yorkers – "Love for Sale", "I Happen to Like New York", "Where Have You Been?"
- (1932) Gay Divorce (adapted to film as The Gay Divorcee, 1934) – "After You, Who?", "Night and Day"
- (1933) Nymph Errant – "The Physician", "It's Bad for Me"
- (1934) Hi Diddle Diddle (revue) — "Miss Otis Regrets"
- (1934) Anything Goes (adapted to film in 1936 and 1956) – "All Through the Night", "Anything Goes", "I Get a Kick Out of You", "You're the Top"
- (1934) Adios Argentina (unproduced film) – "Don't Fence Me In"
- (1935) Jubilee – "Begin the Beguine", "Just One of Those Things"
- (1936) Red, Hot and Blue – "Down in the Depths (On the Ninetieth Floor)", "Ridin' High", "It's De-Lovely"
- (1936) Born to Dance (film) – "You'd Be So Easy to Love", "I've Got You Under My Skin"†
- (1937) Rosalie (film) – "In the Still of the Night"
- (1938) You Never Know – "At Long Last Love", "Let's Misbehave"
- (1938) Leave It to Me! – "Get Out of Town", "My Heart Belongs to Daddy"
- (1939) Broadway Melody of 1940 (film) – "I Concentrate on You", "I've Got My Eyes on You"

- (1939) Du Barry Was a Lady (adapted to film in 1943) – "Do I Love You?", "Give Him the Ooh-La-La", "Well, Did You Evah!", "Friendship"
- (1940) Panama Hattie (adapted to film in 1942) – "Let's Be Buddies"
- (1941) You'll Never Get Rich (film) – "Dream Dancing", "So Near and Yet So Far", "Since I Kissed My Baby Goodbye"†
- (1941) Let's Face It! (adapted to film in 1943) – "Ace in the Hole"
- (1943) Something to Shout About (film) – "You'd Be So Nice to Come Home To"†
- (1943) Something for the Boys
- (1944) Mexican Hayride – "I Love You"
- (1944) Seven Lively Arts – "Ev'ry Time We Say Goodbye"
- (1946) Around the World
- (1948) The Pirate (film) – "Be a Clown"
- (1948) Kiss Me, Kate (adapted to film in 1953) – "Always True to You in My Fashion", "Another Op'nin', Another Show", "Brush Up Your Shakespeare", "I Hate Men", "So in Love", "Tom, Dick or Harry", "Too Darn Hot", "Why Can't You Behave?", "Wunderbar"
- (1950) Out of This World – "From This Moment On", "I Am Loved"
- (1953) Can-Can (adapted to film in 1960) – "Allez-Vous-En", "C'est Magnifique", "I Am in Love", "I Love Paris", "It's All Right with Me"
- (1954) Silk Stockings (adapted to film in 1957) – "All of You"
- (1955) High Society (film) – "I Love You, Samantha", "Mind if I Make Love to You?", "True Love",† "Who Wants to Be a Millionaire?", "You're Sensational"
- (1956) Les Girls (film) – "Ça, C'est L'amour"
- (1958) Aladdin (television) (Porter's last score)

† Was nominated for an Academy Award for Best Original Song, but did not win.

== Discography ==
Hundreds of recordings have been made of Porter's works. Many of these are listed in The Cole Porter Reference Guide.

== Notes, references and sources ==
=== Sources ===
- Algeo, Matthew (2011). Harry Truman's Excellent Adventure: The True Story of a Great American Road Trip. Chicago: Chicago Review Press. ISBN 9781569767078.
- Citron, Stephen (2005). Noel & Cole: the Sophisticates. Milwaukee: Hal Leonard Corporation. ISBN 0634093029. The 1993 edition of this book is available on line.
- Coward, Noël (1982). Graham Payn; Sheridan Morley (eds.). The Noël Coward Diaries (1941–1969). London: Methuen. ISBN 0-297-78142-1. Several other editions of this book are available on line.
- Ewen, David (1961). The Story of America's Musical Theater. New York: Chilton Book Company.
- Furia, Philip; Patterson, Laurie J. (2022). The Poets of Tin Pan Alley (2nd ed.). New York, NY: Oxford University Press. ISBN 978-0190906474.
- Hischak, Thomas S. (1991). Word Crazy. New York: Praeger. ISBN 978-0275938499.
- Kimball, Robert (1991). Cole Porter: Overtures and Ballet Music, Liner note to EMI CD CDC 7 54300 2. London: EMI Records. OCLC 315563881.
- Kimball, Robert (1992a). The Complete Lyrics of Cole Porter. New York: Da Capo Press. ISBN 0-306-80483-2.
- Kimball, Robert (1992b). "Cole Porter". You're the Top: Cole Porter in the 1930s. Indianapolis: Indiana Historical Society. ISBN 0-871-95089-8.
- Kimball, Robert (1999). "Cole Porter". You're Sensational: Cole Porter in the '20s, '40s, & '50s. Indianapolis: Indiana Historical Society. ISBN 0-871-95129-0.
- McBrien, William (1998). Cole Porter: A Biography. New York: Alfred A. Knopf. ISBN 0-394-58235-7.
- Schwartz, Charles (1977). Cole Porter: A Biography. New York: Da Capo Press. ISBN 0-306-80097-7.
- Seuss, Dr. (2012). Richard Marschall (ed.). Just What the Doctor Disordered: Early Writings and Cartoons of Dr. Seuss. Mineola, NY: Dover. ISBN 978-0486498461.
- Sondheim, Stephen (2012). Finishing the Hat: Collected Lyrics (1954–1981). New York: Knopf. ISBN 978-0679439073.
- Whitburn, Joel (1986). Pop Memories 1890-1954. Menomonee Falls, WI: Record Research. ISBN 0-89820-083-0.
- Wilder, Alec (1990). American Popular Song: The Great Innovators, 1900–1950. New York: Oxford University Press. ISBN 978-0195014457.
