= Let's Do It, Let's Fall in Love =

1928 song by Cole Porter

"Let's Do It (Let's Fall in Love)"
- Sheet music, 1928

Song
- Published: 1928
- Genre: Jazz
- Composer: Cole Porter
- Lyricist: Cole Porter

Audio sample
- 2011 performance of "Let's Do It" by Linda November and Artie Schroeck in Nevada: file; help

"Let's Do It, Let's Fall in Love" is a popular song written in 1928 by Cole Porter. It was introduced in Porter's first Broadway success, the musical Paris (1928) by French chanteuse Irène Bordoni, for whom Porter had written the musical as a starring vehicle.

Bordoni's husband and Paris producer Ray Goetz convinced Porter to give Broadway another try with this show. The song was later used in the English production of Wake Up and Dream (1929) and was used as the title theme music in the 1933 Hollywood movie Grand Slam starring Loretta Young and Paul Lukas. In 1960 it was also included in the film version of Cole Porter's Can-Can.

The original lyrics and music of the song entered the public domain in the United States in 2024.

== History ==
The first of Porter's "list songs", it features a string of suggestive and droll comparisons and examples, preposterous pairings and double entendres, dropping famous names and events, drawing from highbrow and popular culture. Porter was a strong admirer of the Savoy operas of Gilbert and Sullivan, many of whose stage works featured similar comic list songs.

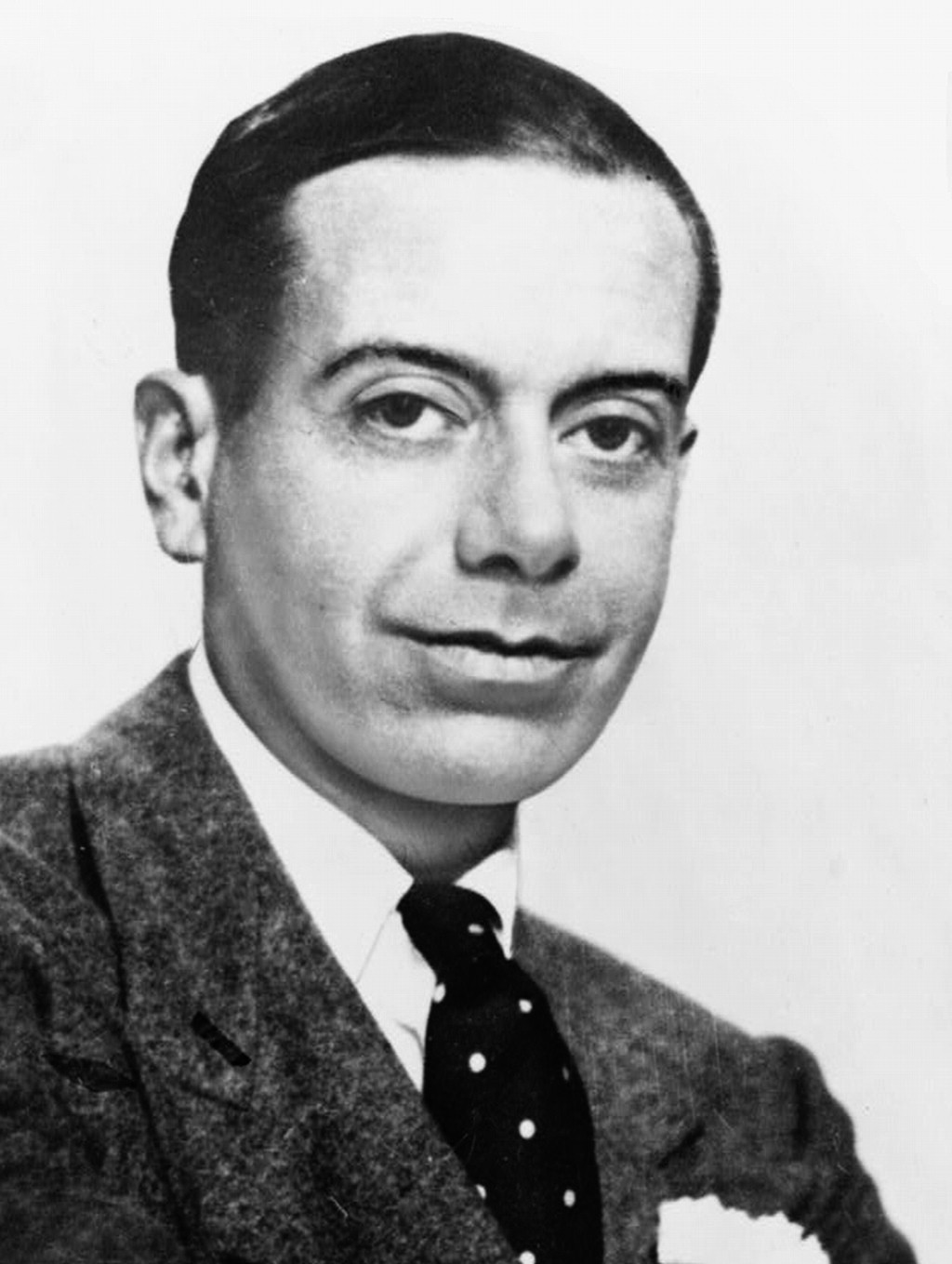
Cole Porter, composer of "Let's Do It, Let's Fall in Love"

The first refrain covers human ethnic groups, the second refrain birds, the third refrain marine life, the fourth refrain insects and centipedes, and the fifth refrain non-human mammals.

With "Let's do 'it'" a euphemism for sexual intercourse in English, author Sheldon Patinkin wrote that it was "the first hit song to proclaim openly that sex is fun." The author of Staging Desire: Queer Readings of American Theater History drew a line from Porter's use of barely veiled double entendres such as "Moths in your rugs do it, What's the use of moth-balls?" to his "pleasure" in barely masking his homosexuality from the public.

The song has regularly lent itself over the years to the addition of contemporary or topical stanzas. For example, in 1955 the lines "Even Liberace, we assume, does it," "Ernest Hemingway could just do it" and many more were added by Noël Coward in his Las Vegas cabaret performance of the song, in which he replaced most of Porter's lyrics with his own.

== Legacy ==
The song has been revived many times since 1928, although usually with only a limited portion of the original lyrics. A punk rock version performed by Joan Jett and Paul Westerberg was used as the theme song in the 1995 film Tank Girl, and later in a more classical version in a musical revue number within the film. In the revue, the song is at first performed by stage actress Ann Magnuson, but is taken over by star Lori Petty after she places duct tape over Magnuson's mouth. It was originally recorded with Joan Jett and Greg Graffin, but Atlantic Records did not want them using Graffin so they deleted his voice and recorded Westerberg's. Joan Jett and Greg Graffin's version of "Let's Do It" was eventually released in 2000 on the compilation CD Laguna Tunes (Blackheart Records).

The White Stripes' song "Forever for Her (Is Over for Me)", from their 2005 album Get Behind Me Satan, borrows lyrics and themes from the song. Brazilian singers Chico Buarque and Elza Soares recorded a Portuguese adaptation by Carlos Rennó, "Façamos – Vamos Amar", on Buarque's 2002 album Duetos. Scottish singer Shirley Manson of Garbage incorporated lyrics from the song into Garbage's performance of their song "Vow" at Bizarre festival in 1996.

The song is featured prominently in Woody Allen's 2011 film Midnight in Paris. Actor Yves Heck played Cole Porter. In June 2026, CBS News included the song in its list of the 250 essential American songs of the past 250 years.

== Racial stereotypes in original 1928 lyric ==
In Porter's publication from 1928, the opening lines for the chorus carried three racial references: Chinks, Japs, and Lapps.

The original was:

Chinks do it, Japs do it,
up in Lapland little Laps do it...

The original line can be heard in several early recordings of the song, such as a recording made by the Dorsey Brothers & their Orchestra (featuring a vocal by a young Bing Crosby), Rudy Vallée, Paul Whiteman And His Orchestra, all in 1928, and a version of the song by the singer and well-known Broadway star Mary Martin (with Ray Sinatra's orchestra), recorded in 1944. Another example is Billie Holiday, in 1941. Peggy Lee with the Benny Goodman orchestra recorded a version in 1941 with these lyrics.

CBS came up with less offensive lyrics, which NBC adopted, and changed the opening to the refrain: "Birds do it, bees do it, even educated fleas do it." when they recognized that the line was offensive.
