= E. Ray Goetz =

American songwriter (1866–1954)

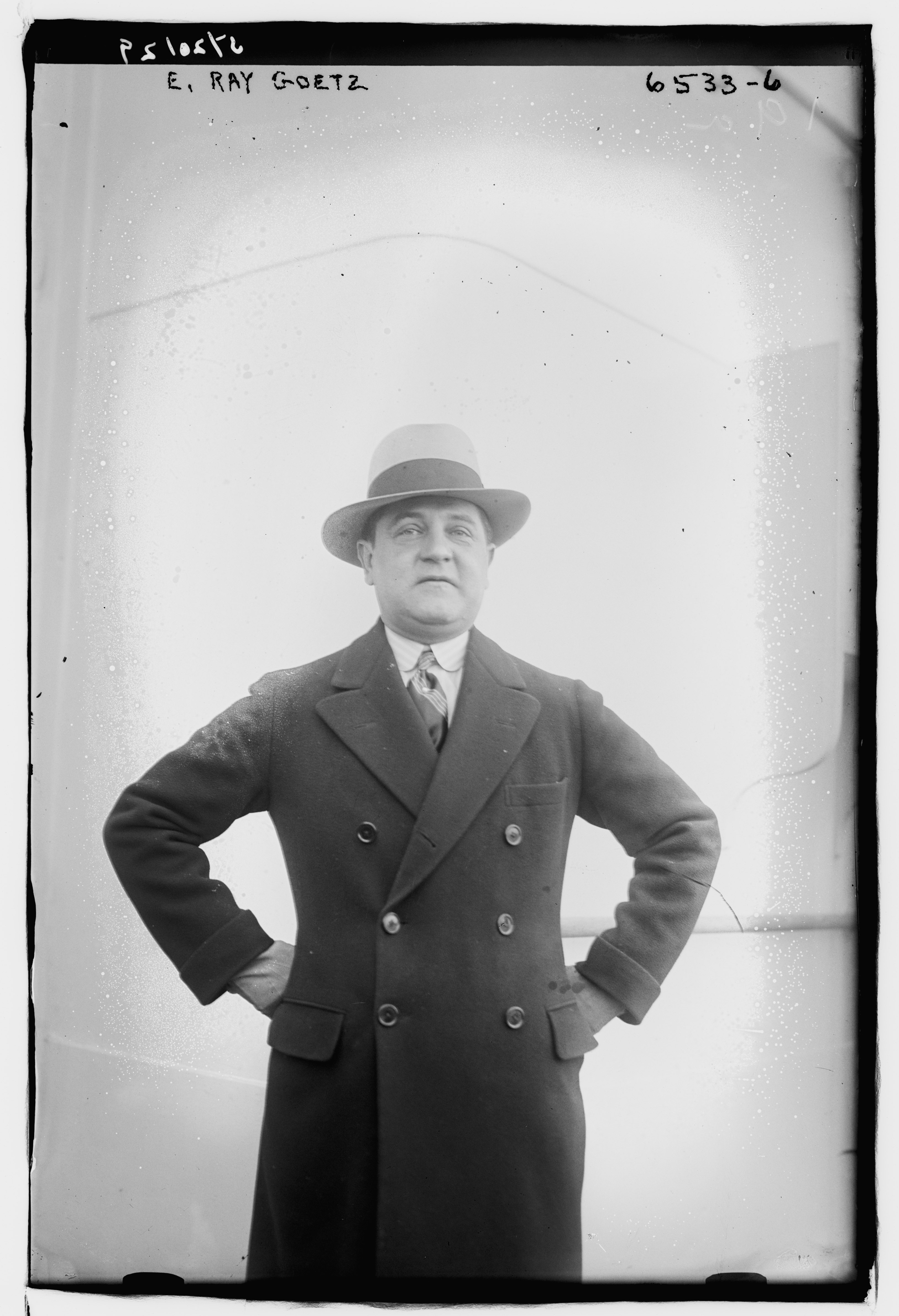
E. Ray Goetz

Edward Ray Goetz (June 12, 1886 – June 12, 1954) was an American composer, lyricist, playwright, theatre director, and theatrical producer. A Tin Pan Alley songwriter, he published more than 500 songs during his career, many of them originally written for the New York stage. His songs were recorded by several artists, including Judy Garland, Al Jolson, and Blossom Seeley. He was active as both a lyricist and composer for Broadway musicals from 1906 through to 1930, collaborating with artists like George Gershwin, Cole Porter, Sigmund Romberg, and A. Baldwin Sloane to create material for the theatre.

Beginning with the musical Hitchy-Koo of 1917, he produced several of the musicals and plays he was creatively involved in up until the 1930-1931 Broadway season, when he produced his final stage work, Porter's The New Yorkers, for which he created the story and served as director. He authored the play The Lady of the Orchids which he produced on Broadway in 1928. He produced and served as production supervisor of Herbert Fields and Porter's 1929 musical Fifty Million Frenchmen which was adapted by Warner Brothers into a 1930 film of the same name.

His work as a songwriter was featured in the films For Me and My Gal (1942), Somebody Loves Me (1952), and The Greatest Show On Earth (1952), the latter of which resulted from his work as the lyricist for the Ringling Bros. and Barnum & Bailey Circus during the final three years of his life. Having never stopped working, he died in 1954.

== Life and career ==
Born in Buffalo, New York, on June 12, 1886, Goetz was the son of a provision merchant. At the age of 16 he moved to New York City to pursue a career as a songwriter. He began writing songs for Ted Shapiro's Tin Pan Alley music publishing company. He studied music at Yale University and Columbia University; and was a pupil of composer Edward MacDowell at the latter institution.

Goetz was active as a lyricist and composer for Broadway musicals from 1906 through 1930. He contributed words and music to several musical revues, including the first Ziegfeld Follies (The Follies of 1907). Other musicals in which his work was featured included The Orchid (1907), The Gay White Way (1907), Two Islands (1907), The Prince Of Bohemia (1910), A Matinee Idol (1910), The Hen-Pecks (1911), The Never Homes (1911), Hanky Panky (1912), All Aboard (1913), Words and Music (1917), and George White's Scandals (1922). He was the lyricist for composer Sigmund Romberg's is 1915 musical Hands Up; to which he also contributed some music.

Beginning with Hitchy-Koo of 1917, Goetz began producing musicals and plays on Broadway. In addition to serving as producer of this musical, he also penned the musical book and served as lyricist with composer Raymond Hubbell writing the music. He produced several more musicals in which he contributed music and/or lyrics, including As You Were (1920), Little Miss Bluebeard (1923), and Cole Porter's Paris (1928), the latter of which included some musical material by Goetz.

He later produced, directed, and created the story for Porter's 1930 Broadway musical The New Yorkers. He authored and produced the 1928 play The Lady of the Orchids. At one point Goetz had planned on producing a production of the Ballets Russes on Broadway with choreography by Léonide Massine, but the Wall Street Crash of 1929 caused serious financial problems for Goetz and that project was abandoned.

Goetz's younger sister Dorothy married Irving Berlin in 1912. She died from typhoid fever contracted during their honeymoon. She was 20 years old at the time of her death. The two men remained friends after her death, and their collaborations include the 1912 song "Alexander's Bagpipe Band", a parody of Berlin's 1911 tune "Alexander's Ragtime Band".

Goetz was a charter member of ASCAP in 1914. Goetz served as the lyricist for the Ringling Bros. and Barnum & Bailey Circus from 1951 through to 1954. He worked with circus bandmaster Merle Evans and John Ringling North. North wrote many of the tunes to which Goetz set words, in addition to serving as President of the circus. Goetz and Ringling North's songs were featured in The Greatest Show On Earth (1952) and in live performances during the 1950s.

Goetz was married three times. His first marriage was to Elizabeth Leyland with whom he had a daughter. His second marriage to Ethel Johnson ended in divorce in April 1918. On 24 October 1918 Goetz was married to actress Irène Bordoni. They were divorced on November 6, 1929.

Goetz died on his 68th birthday on June 12, 1954 in Greenwich, Connecticut. Some of his songs were used posthumously in the 1975 Broadway musical Doctor Jazz.

== Composer and lyricist ==
=== Songs ===
Goetz co-wrote the music for For Me and My Gal, 1942

Goetz published more than 500 songs during his career. His 1911 song "Toddling The Todalo" which he authored with composer Alfred Baldwin Sloane for the musical The Hen-Pecks became a hit song for vaudeville star Blossom Seeley. In 1916 he and Edgar Leslie co-authored the lyrics to the popular song "For Me and My Gal" with George W. Meyer serving as composer. A hit with the public, it later inspired the 1942 film For Me and My Gal in which the song was sung by Judy Garland and Gene Kelly.

Also in 1916, Goetz co-authored the Hawaiian inspired song "Yaaka Hula Hickey Dula" with Joe Young and Pete Wendling, which became a hit song for Al Jolson in the musical Robinson Crusoe, Jr. and a best selling single for Columbia Records. Also successful, was the 1923 song "Who'll Buy My Violets?" which Goetz authored for the 1923 musical Little Miss Bluebeard. He and Buddy DeSylva collaborated on lyrics for several songs with music by George Gershwin for the 1922 and 1923 editions of George White's Scandals, including "Across the Sea," "Let's Be Lonesome Together," "There Is Nothing Too Good for You," and "Throw 'Er in High."

His other popular-song compositions included "So This Is Love," "Don't Go In the Lion's Cage Tonight," "If You Could Care," "Meet Me in the Shadows," "The Land of Going to Be," and "Boom." He also wrote "There's a Girl in Chateau Thierry" in 1919.

=== Stage scores ===
- "For Me and My Gal"
- "The Never Homes" in 1911
- "The Hen Pecks" in 1911
- "Hokey-Pokey" in 1912
- "Hanky-Panky" in 1912
- "Roly-Poly"
- "All Aboard"
- "The Pleasure Seekers"
- "Hitchy-Koo"

=== Movie songwriter ===
- "So This Is Love", 1953
- "Toddling the Todalo", 1952
- "Lovely Luawana Lady", 1952
- "Do I Love You?", 1923)
- "He Goes to Church on Sunday", 1907
- "Yaaka Hula Hickey Dula (Hawaiian Love Song)" (lyrics)
- "Fifty Million Frenchmen", 1931 (playwright)
- "Paris", 1929
- "If You Could Care", 1929

== Producer ==
- George White's Scandals of 1922
- As You Were
- The French Doll
- Little Miss Bluebeard
- Paris
- Fifty Million Frenchmen
- The New Yorkers
