= List of songs written by Cole Porter =

Cole Porter (1891-1964) was an American songwriter. He primarily wrote songs for Broadway musicals and Hollywood films.

== Songs ==
- Songs written at Yale University (1909-1913):

“Bingo Eli Yale” (1910)
“Bull Dog” (1911)
“Antoinette Birby”

- Cora (1911 college musical)
- And the Villain Still Pursued Her (1912 college musical)

"We are the Chorus of the Show"
"Strolling"
"The Lovely Heroine"
"I'm the Villain"
"Twilight"
"Llewellyn"
"That Zip Cornwall Cooch"
"Charity"
"Queens of Terpsichore"
"Leaders of Society"
"Submarine"
"Barcelona Maid"
"Silver Moon"
"Dear Doctor"
"Anytime"
"Come to Bohemia"
"Dancing"
"Fare Thee Well"

- The Pot of Gold (1912 college musical)

"At the Rainbow"
"Bellboys"
"Longing for Dear Old Broadway"
"When I Used to Lead the Ballet"
"My Houseboat on the Thames"
"She Was a Fair Young Mermaid"
"What's This Awful Hullabaloo"
"What a Charming Afternoon"
"Since We've Met"
"Exercise"
"We are So Aesthetic"
"Scandal"
"I Wonder Where My Girl Is Now"
"My Salvation Army Queen"
"It's Awfully Hard When Mother's Not Along"
"I Want to Be Married (To a Delta Kappa Epsilon Man)"
"Ha, Ha, They Must Sail for Siberia"
"I Love You So"
"Loie and Chlodo"
"So Let Us Hail"
"That Rainbow Rag" (cut)
"If I Were a Football Man" (cut)

- The Kaleidoscope (1913 college musical)

"At the Dawn Tea"
"We are Prom Girls"
"Chaperons"
"In the Land Where My Heart Was Born"
"Meet Me Beside the River"
"Beware of the Sophomore"
"Rick-Chick-a-Chick"
"Good-bye My True Love"
"On My Yacht"
"We're a Group of Nonentities"
"Flower Maidens"
"Absinthe"
"The Absinthe Drip"
"Maid of Santiago"
"As I Love You"
"Duodecimalogue"
"Oh, What a Pretty Pair of Lovers"
"A Member of the Yale Elizabethan Club"
"Moon Man"
"My Georgia Gal"

- Paranoia (1914 college musical)
- We’re All Dressed Up and We Don’t Know Huerto Go (1914 college musical)
- See America First (1916 stage musical)
- Hitchy-Koo of 1919 (1919 stage musical)

“I Introduced”
"Old-Fashioned Garden"

- Hitchy-Koo of 1922 (1922 stage musical)
- Greenwich Village Follies (1924 stage musical)

"I'm In Love Again"

- "Hot-House Rose" (single song, 1927)
- "Weren't We Fools?" (single song, 1927)
- La Revue Des Ambassadeurs (1928 stage musical)

"Pilot Me"

- Paris (1928 stage musical)

"Let's Do It, Let's Fall in Love"
"Let's Misbehave" (written for Paris, but cut and then recorded separately)
"Which?"

- Wake Up and Dream (1929 stage musical)

”I Loved Him, But He Didn’t Love Me”
”I’m a Gigolo”
"What Is This Thing Called Love?"

- Fifty Million Frenchmen (1929 stage musical)

”Find Me a Primitive Man”
”The Tale of the Oyster”
"Why Don't We Try Staying Home?"
"You Do Something to Me"
"You've Got That Thing"

- The New Yorkers (1930 stage musical)

”I Happen to Like New York”
"Let's Fly Away"
"Love for Sale"
"Take Me Back to Manhattan"
"Where Have You Been"

- Gay Divorce (1932 stage musical)

”After You, Who?”
"How's Your Romance?"
"I've Got You On My Mind"
"Night and Day"

- Nymph Errant (1933 stage musical)

"It's Bad for Me"
"How Could We Be Wrong?"
"The Physician"

- Ever Yours (1933-1934 stage musical, unproduced)

"Once Upon A Time"

- Hi Diddle Diddle (1934 revue)

"Miss Otis Regrets"

- Anything Goes (1934 stage musical)

"All Through the Night"
"Anything Goes"
"Be Like the Bluebird"
"Blow, Gabriel, Blow"
"Buddie Beware"
"I Get a Kick Out of You"
"Thank You So Much, Mrs. Lowsborough-Goodby" (written for the musical but not used in production)
"You're the Top"

- Adios Argentina (1934-1935 film, unproduced)

"Don't Fence Me In"

- Jubilee (1935 stage musical)

"Begin the Beguine"
"Just One of Those Things"
”A Picture of Me Without You”
"Why Shouldn't I?"

- Born to Dance (1936 film)

”Goodbye, Little Dream, Goodbye”
"I've Got You Under My Skin"
"Rap, Tap On Wood"
”Swingin’ the Jinx Away”
"Easy to Love"

- Red, Hot and Blue (1936 stage musical)

"Down In The Depths"
"It's De-Lovely"
"Ours"
"Ridin' High"

- Rosalie (1937 film)

"In the Still of the Night"

- You Never Know (1938 stage musical)

"At Long Last Love"
"By Candlelight"
"From Alpha to Omega"

- Leave It to Me! (1938 stage musical)

"From Now On"
"Get Out of Town"
”Most Gentlemen Don’t Like Love”
"My Heart Belongs to Daddy"
“Tomorrow”

- Broadway Melody of 1940 (1939 film)

"Between You and Me"
"I Concentrate on You"
"I Happen to Be in Love"
"I've Got My Eyes on You"

- Du Barry Was a Lady (1939 stage musical)

”But in the Morning, No”
"Do I Love You?"
"Friendship"
”Give Him the Ooh-La-La”
"Katie Went To Haiti"
"Well, Did You Evah!"

- Panama Hattie (1940 stage musical)

”Make It Another Old-Fashioned, Please”
”I've Still Got My Health”

- You’ll Never Get Rich (1941 film)

"Dream Dancing"
"So Near And Yet So Far"

- Let’s Face It! (1941 stage musical)

"Ace in the Hole"
"Ev'rything I Love"
”Farming”
"I Hate You, Darling"
”Let’s Not Talk About Love”
”Rub Your Lamp”

- Something to Shout About (1943 film)

"You'd Be So Nice to Come Home To"

- Something for the Boys (1943 stage musical)

"Could It Be You"
”The Leader of a Big-Time Band”

- Mexican Hayride (1944 stage musical)

"I Love You"
"There Must Be Someone for Me"

- Seven Lively Arts (1944 stage musical)

"Ev'ry Time We Say Goodbye"

- Around the World (1946 stage musical)
- Kiss Me, Kate (1948 stage musical)

"Always True to You in My Fashion"
"Another Op'nin', Another Show"
"Bianca"
"Brush Up Your Shakespeare"
"From This Moment On"
"I Am Ashamed That Women Are So Simple"
"I Hate Men"
"I’ve Come to Wive It Wealthily in Padua"
"So in Love"
"Tom, Dick or Harry"
"Too Darn Hot"
"We Open In Venice"
"Were Thine That Special Face"
"Where is the Life That Late I Led?"
"Why Can't You Behave?"
"Wunderbar"

- The Pirate (1948 film)

"Be a Clown"
"Love of My Life"
"Mack the Black"
"Niña"
"You Can Do No Wrong"

- Adam's Rib (1949 film)

”Farewell, Amanda”

- Out of This World (1950 stage musical)

"Cherry Pies Ought To Be You"
"From This Moment On"
"I Am Loved"
"Where, Oh Where?"
"You Don't Remind Me"

- Can-Can (1953 stage musical)

"Allez-Vous-En"
"Can-Can"
"C'est Magnifique"
"Come Along with Me"
"I Am in Love"
"I Love Paris"
"It's All Right with Me"
"Live and Let Live"
"Montmart'"

- Silk Stockings (1955 stage musical, 1957 film)

"All of You"
"As On Through the Seasons We Sail"
"Fated To Be Mated"
"Paris Loves Lovers"
"Satin and Silk"
"Siberia"
"Silk Stockings"
"Stereophonic Sound"

- High Society (1956 film)

"High Society Calypso"
"I Love You, Samantha"
"Little One"
"Mind if I Make Love to You?"
"Now You Has Jazz"
"True Love"
"Who Wants to Be a Millionaire?"
"You're Sensational"

- Les Girls (1956 film)

"Ça, C'est L'amour"
"You're Just Too, Too"

- Aladdin (1958 television musical)

Come To The Supermarket in Old Peking

== Sources ==
Kimball, Robert, ed. (1992). The Complete Lyrics of Cole Porter. New York: Da Capo Press. ISBN 0-306-80483-2.
