= Kiss Me, Kate (original Broadway cast recording) =

Kiss Me Kate
- Cover used for the album of 45-rpm records (cat. no. A-200)

Cast recording by Alfred Drake with the original Broadway cast
- Released: February 15, 1949
- Genre: Show tunes
- Label: Columbia Masterworks

Professional ratings
Review scores
Source	Rating
AllMusic	(2009 CD reissue)

Kiss Me, Kate, credited to Alfred Drake with the original Broadway cast, is the album containing the original studio cast recording of the 1948 musical Kiss Me, Kate. It was released by Columbia on February 15, 1949.

The album was released as a set of six 78-rpm phonograph records (cat. no. C-200). It was also made available on LP (cat. no. ML-4140).

== Reception ==
The album spent several weeks at number one on Billboard's Best-Selling Popular Record Albums chart.

== Legacy ==
The album was added to the National Recording Registry as being "culturally or historically significant".

== Track listing ==
12" LP (Columbia Masterworks ML 4140)

Side 1
No.	Title	Artist(s)	Length
1.	"Overture" – "Another Op'nin', Another Show"	Annabelle Hill with Chorus
2.	"Why Can't You Behave"	Kirk & Lang
3.	"Wunderbar"	Drake & Morison
4.	"So in Love"	Morison
5.	"We Open in Venice"	Drake, Morison, Kirk and Lang
6.	"Tom, Dick or Harry"	Kirk, Lang, Edwin Clay and Charles Wood
7.	"I've Come to Wive It Wealthily in Padua"	Drake with Chorus
8.	"I Hate Men"	Morison

Side 2
No.	Title	Artist(s)	Length
1.	"Were Thine That Special Face"	Drake
2.	"Too Darn Hot"	Lorenzo Fuller, Eddie Sledge and Fred Davis
3.	"Where Is the Life That I Led?"	Drake
4.	"Always True to You (in My Fashion)"	Kirk
5.	"Bianca"	Lang
6.	"So in Love" (Reprise)	Drake
7.	"Brush Up Your Shakespeare"	Jack Diamond, Harry Clark
8.	"1." "I Am Ashamed That Women Are So Simple" "2." "Finale"	1. Morison; 2. Drake & Morison

== Charts ==
Chart (1949)	Peak position
US Billboard Best-Selling Popular Record Albums	1
