= Kiss Me Kate (disambiguation) =

Kiss Me, Kate is a 1948 musical by Cole Porter.

Kiss Me Kate may also refer to:

- Kiss Me, Kate (original Broadway cast recording), a 1949 album containing the original Broadway cast recording of the musical
- Kiss Me, Kate (Jo Stafford and Gordon MacRae album), a 1949 album of songs from the musical
- Kiss Me Kate (film), a 1953 film version of the musical
- Kiss Me Kate (1968 film), a 1968 TV movie adaptation of the musical
- Kiss Me, Kate (2024 film), a 2024 filming of a West End revival of the musical
- Kiss Me, Kate (TV film), 1964 BBC TV version
- Kiss Me Kate (TV series), a British situation comedy
- Kiss Me Kate (horse), an American Thoroughbred racehorse named the 1951 American Champion Three-Year-Old Filly
- Kiss Me Kate, a 2009 EP by Kate Tsui
