= Elizabethan Club =

Social club at Yale University

Coordinates: 41°18′37.4″N 72°55′34.5″W

- Founded: 1911; 115 years ago Yale University
- Type: Literary
- Affiliation: Independent
- Status: Active
- Emphasis: Social
- Scope: Local
- Symbol: Falcon
- Chapters: 1
- Nickname: Lizzie
- Headquarters: 459 College Street; New Haven, Connecticut 06511; United States
- Website: elizabethanclub.yale.edu

The Elizabethan Club is a social club at Yale University named for Queen Elizabeth I and her era. Its profile and members tend toward a literary disposition, and conversation is one of the Club's chief purposes.

The Elizabethan Club's collection of 16th- and 17th-century books and artifacts include Shakespearean folios and quartos, first editions of Milton's Paradise Lost, Spenser's Faerie Queene, and Francis Bacon's Essayes, all locked in the club's vault. The collection is only available for inspection at certain times, or to researchers upon request at Yale's Beinecke Library.

== History ==
Architect Kenneth Boroson, 1995-6, Elizabethan Club Garden. Engraved under the bust of Shakespeare: "I know a bank where the wild thyme blows, where oxlips and the nodding violet grows, Quite over-canopied with lush woodbine, With sweet musk-roses, and with eglantine..."

The club was founded in 1911 by Alexander Smith Cochran, a member of the Yale Class of 1896 and Wolf's Head Society. As an undergraduate, he regretted the lack of a congenial atmosphere in which to discuss literature and the arts with classmates and faculty. In 1910 he began to assemble a small but exceptional collection of first and early editions of the Elizabethan and Jacobean plays that he had studied with William Lyon Phelps, and in 1911 he offered the collection to Yale as the central point of interest for a club where conversation – and tea – would be available every afternoon.

Cochran also provided a clubhouse, with quarters for a resident steward, and a generous endowment of $100,000. His portrait hangs above the fireplace in the Vault Room, and his birthday (28 February) is marked by an annual Founder’s Dinner. The life portrait of the Virgine Queene in the Tea Room, attributed to Federico Zuccari, came with the founder’s original gift. Began during the literary renaissance at the university between 1909 and 1920, the club attracted such book collectors as Phelps, Chauncey Brewster Tinker, and John Berdan.

Cochran’s gift of 141 folios and quartos includes, among other important volumes, the first four Shakespeare Folios, one of the three known copies of the 1604 Hamlet, and the copy of Ben Jonson's Works (1616) inscribed by the author to his friend Francis Young. Over the years additional volumes of equal importance, such as first or early quartos of all the major dramatists, have been acquired by gift and purchase, and the entire collection now numbers around 300 volumes. A catalog of this collection, The Elizabethan Club of Yale University and Its Library, prepared by Yale's Stephen Parks, was published in 1986 and considerably expanded in a 2011 edition. The club vault also holds a sample of 16th-century documents, manuscripts (for example, a letter of condolence from Queen Elizabeth to her friend Lady Southwell, 15 October 1598) and medals (one celebrating the defeat of the Spanish Armada in 1588), as well as various artifacts (a lock of Byron’s hair; a snuff box purportedly carved from a mulberry tree planted by Shakespeare at New Place, his home at Stratford; and a guest book signed by many of the club's visitors).

Documents relating to the club's organization and activities, including a tradition of formal correspondence written in Latin to the Signet Society at Harvard, are viewable at the online Yale Manuscripts and Archives Collection.

== Symbols and traditional ==
The club was named for Queen Elizabeth I and her era. Its emblem is a falcon, found on Queen Elizabeth’s badge. The organization's nickname is Lizzie.

Guests sign in upon entering the clubhouse; consequently, Lizzie's collection of these guestbooks includes autographs of prominent literary, arts, and other figures who have visited. Among these are Theodore Roosevelt, Edward Heath, Robert Frost, (a frequent visitor) Bertrand Russell, Joseph Conrad, W. B. Yeats, Eva Le Gallienne, Diana Rigg, Allen Ginsberg, William Carlos Williams, Dr. Ruth Westheimer, and Kenneth Branagh.

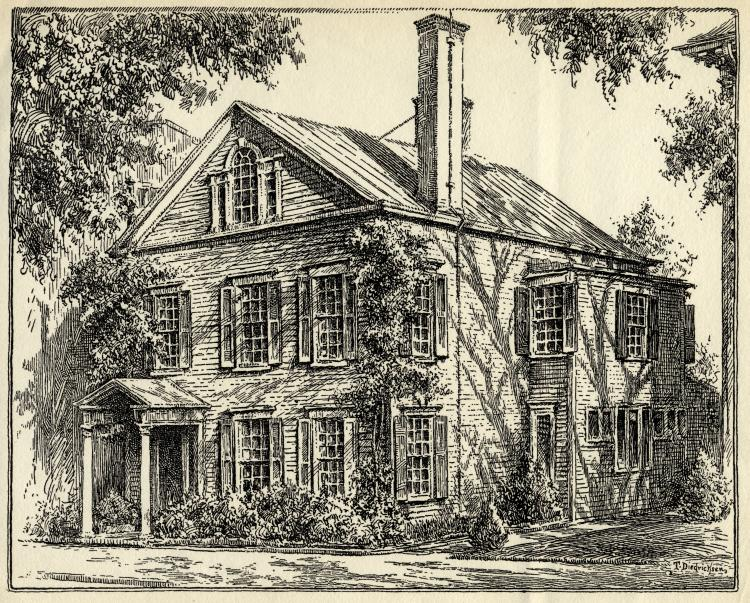
The Elizabethan Club, 1920

== Club house ==
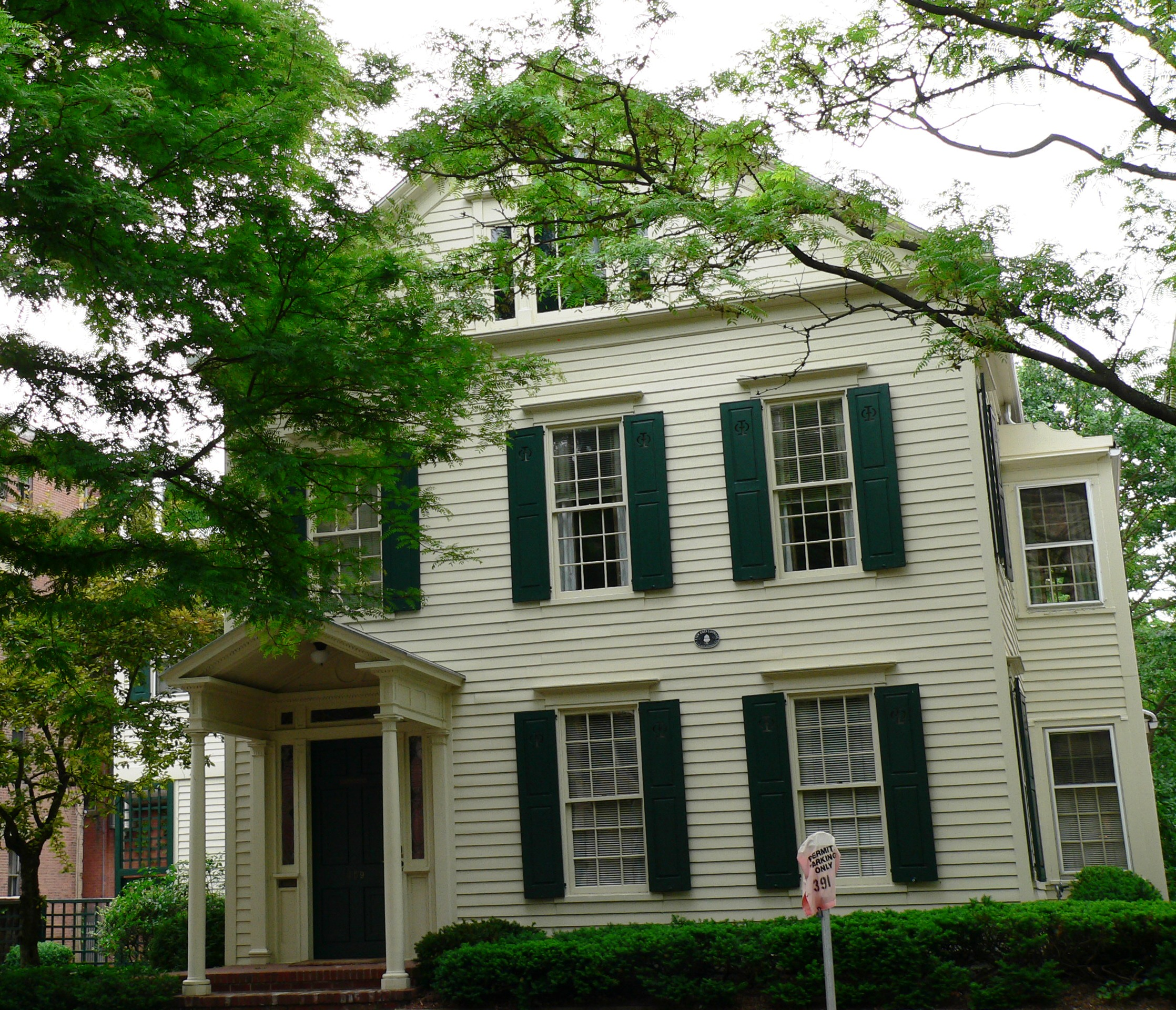
Leverett-Griswold House, circa 1775, renovated 1810-15 and 1995-96. Home of the Elizabethan Club.

The Elizabethan Club is housed in a landmarked Federal-style building, the Leverett Griswold House, built circa 1775. It is located at 459 College Street. It was previously owned successively by the Leverett Griswold and Wilbur Gilbert families. It was renovated between 1810 and 1815. Cochran purchased the house for the club in 1911. Kenneth Boroson, of Kenneth Boroson Architects, LLC designed an addition and rear garden in 1995-1996.

Architectural historian Patrick Pinnell in his 1999 history of Yale's campus says this "crisp little white house... shows off an early example of a gable fronting the street, rather than being turned parallel to it... predicting the temple-front individuality of Greek Revival..." It provides the only remaining Federal-era aspect on this stretch of College Street, one that Pinnell discusses as having been in the mid 19th century a residential street.

On the second floor, the Map Room contains a collection of books about Shakespeare and the Elizabethan period, most of them published in the middle of the twentieth century. In the Study Room, also called the Punch Room, there are bound copies of Punch from 1847 to 1985 and, in the Governors Room numerous bound sets of British and European authors, plus a small collection of books presented to the club by authors who are members.

== Membership ==
Membership in the Elizabethan Club is by invitation only. Membership includes male and female undergraduates, graduate students, university staff, and faculty. Fifteen undergraduate members are elected per class year; however, freshmen are not admitted; accordingly there are at most 45 current seniors, 30 juniors, and 15 sophomores at any time. It is not a "final society", in that membership in another Yale secret society, association, or club is not a bar to also having club membership.

== Activities ==
The club is dedicated to conversation, tea, the art of the book, and literature focused on—but not exclusively of—the Elizabethan era. During the academic year, the clubhouse is open daily for the use of its members. Tea is served every afternoon.

From time to time, the club sponsors special events such as Club Nights with a speaker and discussion; seasonal parties and teas; and an annual lecture honoring Maynard Mack (1909–2001), former president of the club, longtime faculty member and illustrious Shakespeare scholar. Mack lecturers have included Joanne Akalaitis, John Barton, Tony Church, Lisa Harrow, Michael Kahn, Mark Lamos, Carey Perloff, Michael Billington and Sam Waterston.

The Lizzie informally fosters an appreciation for the Art of the Book and of fine printing and typography, befitting a campus with several working old-fashioned undergraduate presses. The club also has underwritten the production of a small series of books, published by the Yale University Press. Indeed, publishing specialized works relating to the club's mission has been a practice dating back to its early years.

== Governance ==
The affairs of the club are managed by a self-perpetuating Board of Incorporators (six members of the university) that meets twice a year and by an elected Board of Governors.

== Popular culture ==
Cole Porter, a member himself according to some sources, although others say he was rejected for membership and responded with satirical compositions, made reference to the club in two of his songs: "A Member of the Yale Elizabethan Club", a satirical description of a self-absorbed "Lizzie" member, and "Since We've Met," in which he satirizes a prudish couple, writing "We shrink at any oath except a soft 'Beelzebub.' / We're out-Elizabething the Elizabethan Club."

== See also ==
- College literary societies
- List of college literary societies
- List of songs written by Cole Porter
