= List of Billboard number-one albums of 1949 =

These are the Billboard magazine number-one albums from 1949.

== Chart history ==
Issue date	Album	Artist(s)	Label	Ref.
January 1	Merry Christmas	Bing Crosby	Decca	
January 8	Merry Christmas	Bing Crosby	Decca	
January 15	Merry Christmas	Bing Crosby	Decca	
January 22	Vaughn Monroe Sings	Vaughn Monroe	RCA Victor	
January 29	Roses in Rhythm	Frankie Carle	Columbia	
February 5	Vaughn Monroe Sings	Vaughn Monroe	RCA Victor	
February 12	Words and Music	Soundtrack	MGM	
February 19	Words and Music	Soundtrack	MGM	
February 26	Words and Music	Soundtrack	MGM	
March 5	Words and Music	Soundtrack	MGM	
March 12	Words and Music	Soundtrack	MGM	
March 19	Kiss Me, Kate	Original Cast	Columbia	
March 26	Words and Music	Soundtrack	MGM	
April 2	Kiss Me, Kate	Original Cast	Columbia	
April 9	Kiss Me, Kate	Original Cast	Columbia	
April 16	Kiss Me, Kate	Original Cast	Columbia	
April 23	Kiss Me, Kate	Original Cast	Columbia	
April 30	Kiss Me, Kate	Original Cast	Columbia	
May 7	Kiss Me, Kate	Original Cast	Columbia	
May 14	Kiss Me, Kate	Original Cast	Columbia	
May 21	Kiss Me, Kate	Original Cast	Columbia	
May 28	Kiss Me, Kate	Original Cast	Columbia	
June 4	South Pacific	Mary Martin and Ezio Pinza	Columbia	
June 11	South Pacific	Mary Martin and Ezio Pinza	Columbia	
June 18	South Pacific	Mary Martin and Ezio Pinza	Columbia	
June 25	South Pacific	Mary Martin and Ezio Pinza	Columbia	
July 2	South Pacific	Mary Martin and Ezio Pinza	Columbia	
July 9	South Pacific	Mary Martin and Ezio Pinza	Columbia	
July 16	South Pacific	Mary Martin and Ezio Pinza	Columbia	
July 23	South Pacific	Mary Martin and Ezio Pinza	Columbia	
July 30	South Pacific	Mary Martin and Ezio Pinza	Columbia	
August 6	South Pacific	Mary Martin and Ezio Pinza	Columbia	
August 13	South Pacific	Mary Martin and Ezio Pinza	Columbia	
August 20	South Pacific	Mary Martin and Ezio Pinza	Columbia	
August 27	South Pacific	Mary Martin and Ezio Pinza	Columbia	
September 3	South Pacific	Mary Martin and Ezio Pinza	Columbia	
September 10	South Pacific	Mary Martin and Ezio Pinza	Columbia	
September 17	South Pacific	Mary Martin and Ezio Pinza	Columbia	
September 24	South Pacific	Mary Martin and Ezio Pinza	Columbia	
October 1	South Pacific	Mary Martin and Ezio Pinza	Columbia	
October 8	South Pacific	Mary Martin and Ezio Pinza	Columbia	
October 15	South Pacific	Mary Martin and Ezio Pinza	Columbia	
October 22	South Pacific	Mary Martin and Ezio Pinza	Columbia	
October 29	South Pacific	Mary Martin and Ezio Pinza	Columbia	
November 5	South Pacific	Mary Martin and Ezio Pinza	Columbia	
November 12	South Pacific	Mary Martin and Ezio Pinza	Columbia	
November 19	South Pacific	Mary Martin and Ezio Pinza	Columbia	
November 26	South Pacific	Mary Martin and Ezio Pinza	Columbia	
December 3	South Pacific	Mary Martin and Ezio Pinza	Columbia	
December 10	South Pacific	Mary Martin and Ezio Pinza	Columbia	
December 17	South Pacific	Mary Martin and Ezio Pinza	Columbia	
December 24	Merry Christmas	Bing Crosby	Decca	
December 31	Merry Christmas	Bing Crosby	Decca	

== See also ==
- 1949 in music
