= Strolling (disambiguation) =

Strolling may also refer to:

- "Strolling", a song by Cole Porter
- Strolling, a musical technique used on Way Out West (Sonny Rollins album)
- "Strolling", a song on Grass Roots (Atban Klann album)
- Strolling, a dance tradition of black Greek life in colleges and universities
