= Tom, Dick or Harry (song) =

Song

from the album Kiss Me, Kate
- Released: December 30, 1948
- Genre: show tune
- Songwriter: Cole Porter

"Tom, Dick or Harry" is a show tune from the Cole Porter musical, Kiss Me, Kate, introduced on Broadway on December 30, 1948 by Lisa Kirk (as Bianca); Harold Lang (as Lucentio); Edwin Clay (as Gremio); and Charles Wood (as Hortensio). In the 1953 Hollywood film version, "Tom, Dick or Harry" was performed by Ann Miller (as Bianca), Tommy Rall (as Lucentio), Bobby Van (as Gremio), and Bob Fosse (as Hortensio).

== Performance and release information ==
In this song, during a musical performance of Shakespeare's Taming of the Shrew (the subplot of Kate), three suitors (Gremio, Lucentio, and Hortensio) compete to win Bianca's affections (Gremio claiming wealth, Hortensio offering social standing, and Lucentio with a promise of love).

Whereas other songs from Kiss Me, Kate (such as "So in Love" and "Too Darn Hot") were released as singles and achieved commercial success outside the show ("So in Love" reached the top ten on the Hit Parade in 1949 and has since been covered by scores of recording artists), "Tom, Dick or Harry" was written expressly to advance the Shrew subplot and is, therefore, a showtune in the truest sense of the word. This is why many studio (non-cast) recordings of Kiss Me, Kate do not include the song.

Perhaps the best-known example of this is Frank Sinatra's Kiss Me, Kate studio album which is part of his four-album (four-show) project that also includes Finian's Rainbow (1947), South Pacific (1949), and Guys and Dolls (1950), and which he produced in 1963 to promote his fledgling label, Reprise Records; hence the project title being the star-studded Reprise Musical Repertory Theatre.

== Historical note ==
In 1990, theatre historian Miles Krueger conducted an interview with Patricia Morison (who originated the title role in Kate) to discuss the original production as well as the six songs dropped from the show prior to the Broadway opening. When asked about one of the deleted songs, "If Ever Married I'm", Morison responded by stating: "That was for Bianca. It was replaced by 'Tom, Dick or Harry' which tells the same story".

== Performance in 2000 ==
On May 18, 2000, "Tom, Dick or Harry" was performed on NBC-TV's Today show by 1999 Broadway revival cast members Amy Spanger (as Bianca), Michael Berresse (as Lucentio), Kevin Neal McCready (as Gremio), and Darren Lee (as Hortensio) as a result of the show having garnered the greatest number of Tony nominations (twelve) for that year.

The Broadway revival of Kate went on to become the top winning show at the 54th Tony Awards (the only show to receive five or more Tonys).
