= Charles Wood (actor) =

American actor (1916–1978)

Charles Wood (April 23, 1916 – May 29, 1978) was an American singer and actor. After moving to New York City from Redwood City, California, where he grew up, he appeared in five Broadway musicals in the 1940s and 1950s.

== Early years ==
Wood was born in Seattle, Washington, to Cyril Percival (Percy) Wood (b. August 18, 1883 in Gonzales, California; d. May 12, 1963 in San Jose, California) and his wife, Edith Florence Chamberlain (b. June 11, 1880 in Oakland, California; d. June 18, 1960 in Belmont, California). They were wed at Trinity Episcopal Parish Church in Seattle on November 6, 1909. Edith Florence Chamberlain Wood is a descendant of John Howland who was among the 102 passengers arriving at Plymouth aboard the Mayflower in 1620. Cyril Percy and his bride resided for one year in Susitna, Alaska, where Cyril was an early day official for the Northern Commercial Company. He served as secretary to William Fairbanks, vice president of the Northern Commercial Company, shortly after the start of the 20th century, and accompanied him on his annual inspection tours of company posts. Later, he was Northern Commercial Company agent at Iditarod, Alaska, and Kodiak, Alaska, where the family resided for eight years and one year respectively.

Charles was born while the family was on one of many visits to Seattle during this period. The family finally left Alaska in 1919 and resided in Seattle for a year before settling in Redwood City in 1920.

Wood attended Lincoln Grammar School in Redwood City and went on to graduate from Redwood City's Sequoia Union High School.

Upon moving to New York City to pursue a career as a professional performer, Wood met and, in 1942, married Adelaide Marchena (b. October 15, 1915 in New York City; d. January 11, 1982 in New York City), a native of Manhattan and a first generation American, the daughter of Carlin and Adelaida Marchena, both of Barcelona, Spain.

== Career ==
Wood appeared on Broadway in five musicals between 1945 and 1953. These included three original productions: Up in Central Park (1945) starring Wilbur Evans and Noah Beery Sr.; originating the role of Hortensio in the hit musical Kiss Me, Kate (1948) starring Alfred Drake, Patricia Morison, Lisa Kirk and Harold Lang; and as Morrie in Wish You Were Here (1952) starring Jack Cassidy, Patricia Marand, Sheila Bond and introducing newcomer Florence Henderson. Kiss Me, Kate was the only Cole Porter musical to reach 1,000 performances during an original run and garnered five 1949 Tony Awards, including the first in the Best Musical category. In addition to original productions, Wood appeared on Broadway in two revivals: Sweethearts (1947) starring Bobby Clark, June Knight and Marjorie Gateson; and Sally.

Wood also appeared in the NBC-TV Hallmark Hall of Fame live color telecast of Kiss Me, Kate on November 20, 1958. A black-and-white kinescope of the telecast (Episode #8–2; Hallmark #29) was released on DVD (release date: February 8, 2011). The telecast starred Drake and Morison (two of the show's four original leads) and also featured Jack Klugman. Although Wood appeared just as he had in the Broadway original a decade earlier, the role he created was played in the broadcast by Jerry Duane. However, Wood sings Hortensio in the 1949 cast recording which was inducted into the Grammy Hall of Fame (class of 1998) and was also inducted into the National Recording Registry (class of 2014).

== Military service ==
Charles Wood served in the United States Army. He was inducted on January 22, 1942, at Fort Dix, New Jersey. He received an honorable discharge on October 18, 1944, at Fort Dix, New Jersey. He achieved the rank of staff sergeant and served in the Headquarters Battery 899th Field Artillery Battalion in Ft Leonard Wood, Missouri.

== Personal life ==
In 1945, shortly after he was cast in Up in Central Park, Wood and his wife moved into an apartment in Midtown Manhattan within walking distance of the Theater District. They continued to reside there until 1972 when the seven-story building was demolished to make way for a residential high-rise tower. During that time, they raised their five children: Charles Jr. (January 30, 1943 – August 28, 2008), Dianne (born February 3, 1944), Barbara (born May 6, 1947), Ronald (born October 19, 1951) and Debra (born December 19, 1952).

His family includes:

1. Older brother, Cyril Chamberlain ("Cy") Wood (b. November 3, 1911 in Susitna, Alaska; d. June 23, 2001 in Topanga, California)
2. Older sister, Mary Wood (b. January 2, 1915 in Iditarod, Alaska; d. July 21, 2009 in Sacramento, California)
3. Younger brother, Alfred Russell Wood (b. June 10, 1917 in Iditarod, Alaska; d. January 1, 2000 in San Luis Obispo, California)
4. Younger sister, Patricia Wood (b. November 19, 1919 in Seattle, Washington; d. December 29, 1998 in San Jose, California)
5. Younger brother, Richard Calvin Wood (b. December 24, 1924 in Oakland, California; d. February 1, 2008 in Phoenix, Arizona)

Virginia Louise Chamberlain Denny (a cousin of the six Wood siblings), was the wife of Victor Winfield Scott Denny Jr., a grandson of David and Louisa Boren Denny of the famed Denny Party who are credited with having founded the city of Seattle in the mid-Nineteenth Century, having named the new city after Chief Seattle (a.k.a. Si'ahl; Sealth) who they negotiated with after having claimed land in the area.

== Death ==
Wood died in 1978, at age 62, in New York City at the former Beekman Downtown Hospital in Lower Manhattan, of complications resulting from a stroke he had suffered two years earlier.

== Bibliography ==
Sources

- Bloom, Ken and Frank Vlastnik. Broadway Musicals: The 101 Greatest Shows of All Time. Black Dog & Leventhal Publishers, Inc, New York, NY. 2004 original edition (ISBN 1579123902); 2008 revised edition (ISBN 9781579123130); 2010 revised edition (ISBN 9781579128494). All three editions include a foreword by Jerry Orbach. A 1948 original cast publicity photo of Kiss Me, Kate, showing Wood in the song "Tom, Dick or Harry" (with his full name listed to the left of the photo), appears on p. 173 of the 2004 edition; on p. 171 of the 2008 edition; and on p. 175 of the 2010 edition.
- Maslon, Laurence and Michael Kantor. Broadway: The American Musical (the companion book to the six-part PBS documentary series). Bulfinch Press; New York, NY (2004). ISBN 0-8212-2905-2. Foreword (2010 revised edition ISBN 978-1-4234-9103-3) by Julie Andrews. A 1948 original cast curtain call photo of Kiss Me, Kate, showing Wood pictured in the front row, appears on p. 229 of both editions.
- The Library of Congress Recorded Sound Reference Center. Show Music on Record, a searchable database based on the book, Show Music on Record: From the 1890s to the 1980s by Jack Raymond, first published in 1982 (ISBN 0804457743). Wood is listed in this online database for singing Hortensio in the song "Tom, Dick or Harry" on the Kiss Me, Kate 1949 original Broadway cast recording: Columbia ML-4140 (1949 LP release); Sony 88697-56207-2 (2009 CD reissue); (2012 MP3 download).
- EMI. Kiss Me, Kate complete score double CD (UK digital recording) with accompanying booklet printed in English, German and French. EMI; London, England (1990). A 1948 original Broadway cast side view photo, showing Wood in "Tom, Dick or Harry" (with his full name and his role listed below the photo), appears on p. 23. A 1948 original Broadway cast curtain call photo, showing Wood pictured in the front row, appears on p. 29.
- Time-Life Books. American Musicals: Cole Porter: Kiss Me, Kate; Can-Can; Anything Goes (one of fifteen American Musicals Series box sets with accompanying 9x9 booklet). Time-Life Records; Alexandria, VA (1981). Wood is pictured in all three of the box set's Kate 1948 original Broadway cast photos: A front view photo, showing Wood in "Tom, Dick or Harry" (with his full name and his role listed above the photo), appears on p. 6. A photo of a Taming of the Shrew scene, showing Wood pictured at center, appears on p. 7. A color photo of the final curtain call, showing Wood pictured in the top row, appears on the box set front cover (back cover: blank). Wood is also credited with originating the role of Hortensio (p. 29) as well as being credited in the song list on the back cover of the booklet (front cover: photo of Cole Porter).
- Time. January 31, 1949 issue. A 1948 original Broadway cast photo of a Taming of the Shrew scene in Kiss Me, Kate, showing Wood pictured at center, appears on the first page of the cover story (pp. 40–43).
