= Little Miss Sunshine (musical) =

2011 musical

- Off-Broadway promotional image
- Music: William Finn
- Lyrics: William Finn
- Book: James Lapine
- Basis: Little Miss Sunshine by Michael Arndt
- Productions: 2011 San Diego, California; 2013 Off-Broadway; 2019 Off West End

Little Miss Sunshine is a musical adapted from the 2006 film of the same name, with music and lyrics by William Finn and book and direction by James Lapine. The musical premiered in San Diego, California, at the Mandell Weiss Theater, La Jolla Playhouse on February 15, 2011 and began performances Off-Broadway at the Second Stage Theatre in October 2013. The musical opened Off West End at the Arcola Theatre in 2019.

== Production history ==
The play was workshopped at the Sundance Institute Theatre Lab at White Oak in Yulee, Florida, from October 25 through November 7, 2009. It then premiered at the La Jolla Playhouse from February 15 through March 27, 2011. The score is by William Finn, with musical staging at La Jolla by Christopher Gattelli. A private reading was done at La Jolla in September 2011, featuring Raúl Esparza and Sherie Rene Scott.

The musical premiered Off-Broadway at the Second Stage Theatre on October 15, 2013 (previews), and officially on November 14, 2013. The production was given a one-week extension before the official opening. The show closed on December 15, 2013. The cast features Will Swenson as Richard Hoover, Hannah Rose Nordberg as Olive Hoover, Stephanie J. Block as Sheryl Hoover, Rory O’Malley as Frank Ginsburg, Wesley Taylor as Joshua Rose, Josh Lamon as Buddy, David Rasche as Grandpa Hoover, Jennifer Sanchez as Miss California and Logan Rowland as Dwayne Hoover. The musical has "undergone a major overhaul since its world premiere at California's La Jolla Playhouse in February 2011, retaining only three songs from the original version." The musical is directed by Lapine, with scenic design by Beowulf Boritt, costume design by Jennifer Caprio, lighting design by Ken Billington, sound design by Jon Weston, and choreography by Michele Lynch.

The musical opened at the Arcola Theatre, Off West End, before touring the UK and Ireland in a new production directed by Mehmet Ergen and produced by Selladoor Productions, marking the show's European premiere.

=== La Jolla cast ===
Georgi James played the role of Olive Hoover in the premiere production at the La Jolla Playhouse. Other cast included Hunter Foster, Malcolm Gets, Dick Latessa, Jennifer Laura Thompson, and Taylor Trensch.

On March 11, 2011 Malcolm Gets left the show. Ensemble member Andrew Samonsky took over the role of Uncle Frank, and understudy Ryan Wagner took over the role of Joshua Rose until the show closed on March 27, 2011.

== Principal roles and casts ==
Character	La Jolla (2011)	Off-Broadway (2013)	Off-West End (2019)
Richard Hoover	Hunter Foster	Will Swenson	Gabriel Vick
Olive Hoover	Georgi James	Hannah Rose Nordberg	Sophie Hartley Booth, Evie Gibson, Lily Mae Denman
Sheryl Hoover	Jennifer Laura Thompson	Stephanie J. Block	Laura Pitt-Pulford
Frank Ginsburg	Malcolm Gets	Rory O'Malley	Paul Keating
Grandpa Hoover	Dick Latessa	David Rasche	Gary Wilmot
Dwayne Hoover	Taylor Trensch	Logan Rowland	Sev Keoshgerian

== Musical numbers ==
Act I

- "The Way of the World" – Hoover family
- For the First Time in My Life" – Olive, Mean Girls, and Hoover family
- "The Happiest Guy in the Van" – Grandpa
- "Pushing the Bus" – Hoover family
- "Always Make Me Proud" – Sheryl, Richard
- "Poor Olive" – Mean Girls
- "How Have I Been?" – Frank, Joshua, Larry
- "Motel Sequence #1" – Richard, Sheryl
- "Most Beautiful Girl in the World" – Grandpa
- "Motel Sequence #2" – Richard, Sheryl
- "Something Better Better Happen" – Sheryl

Act II

- "Nothing Gets in the Way" – Richard, Sheryl, Frank, Olive
- "Something Better Better Happen (Reprise)" – Richard, Sheryl, Frank, Olive
- "Dwayne" – Dwayne
- "What You Left Behind" – Richard
- "LMS Pageant Theme" – Miss California, Buddy, Girls
- "Dolor" – Miss California
- "The Way of the World (Reprise)" – Richard, Sheryl
- "Shake Your Badonkadonk" – Olive, Richard, Frank, Sheryl, Dwayne
- "Finale" – Company

== Awards and nominations ==
=== Original Off-Broadway production ===
Year	Award Ceremony	Category	Nominee	Result
2014	Drama Desk Awards	Outstanding Featured Actress in A Musical	Stephanie J. Block	Nominated
