= Lorenzo Fuller =

American singer (1919–2011)

- Born: Lorenzo Dow Fuller Jr. March 22, 1919; Stockton, Kansas, U.S.
- Died: January 8, 2011 (aged 91) New York City, U.S.
- Genres: Musical theater
- Occupations: Singer; musician; actor; arranger
- Years active: 1920s–1960s

Lorenzo Dow Fuller Jr. (March 22, 1919 – January 8, 2011) was an American singer, musician, actor, and musical director. He was an original cast member of Finian's Rainbow and Kiss Me, Kate, and in the radio show Van and the Genie was the first male African-American actor to star opposite a white woman. His television show Musical Miniatures was also the first to be fronted by a black performer.

== Biography ==
Fuller was born in Stockton, Kansas, the son of L.D. Fuller Sr. and Effie Green Fuller. His father was a successful newspaper publisher and founder of the Fuller Concert Company, which produced shows throughout the Midwest and into Canada and Mexico. By the age of eight, the younger Lorenzo Fuller had begun performing as a harpist on local radio shows, and in his family's troupe. At the age of 15, he began studying opera and classical music at the University of Kansas, and while studying had a regular monthly show on KFKU radio. He was the first black performer to sing with the Kansas University symphony orchestra, becoming known as "the Paul Robeson of KU", and on his graduation performed a solo recital for an audience of over 2000.

He moved to New York in 1945 and studied at the Juilliard School. He could sing in several languages and played many different musical instruments, quickly establishing himself in the city. In 1947, he was a member of the original Broadway cast of Finian's Rainbow, and the following year played Paul in the first production of Kiss Me, Kate. His original performance of Cole Porter's song "Too Darn Hot", with tap dancers Eddie Sledge (the father of the Sledge sisters) and Fred Davis, was recorded and issued in 1949 as a 78-rpm single. Fuller was also successful as a musical arranger, working with George Gershwin as an assistant musical director, and performer, in Porgy and Bess, and touring internationally with the show as American cultural ambassadors.

Fuller was the first African-American to have a network television program, as in 1947 he hosted Musical Miniatures, a regular 15-minute show on NBC. He worked for them until 1952 as a musical director and special materials writer on shows such as Young Broadway, Musical Miniatures, and the Jerry Lester Show. On Musical Miniatures, he was the first African American to have his own television show, several years before Nat "King" Cole. He also appeared on, and won, the Arthur Godfrey Talent Show. His 1950 radio show, Van and the Genie on station WPIX, was the first in which a black man appeared on equal terms with a white woman, Rosamond Vance Kaufman. The pair marched together in the Macy's Thanksgiving Day Parade, behind Jimmy Durante.

Fuller later became a sought-after musical coach to such Broadway performers as Jeannette Adair and Juanita Hall. He continued to perform occasionally at cultural events. A tribute to him took place in his home town of Stockton, Kansas, in 2003.

He died in New York City in 2011, aged 91.
