= Bianca Minola =

- The Taming of the Shrew character
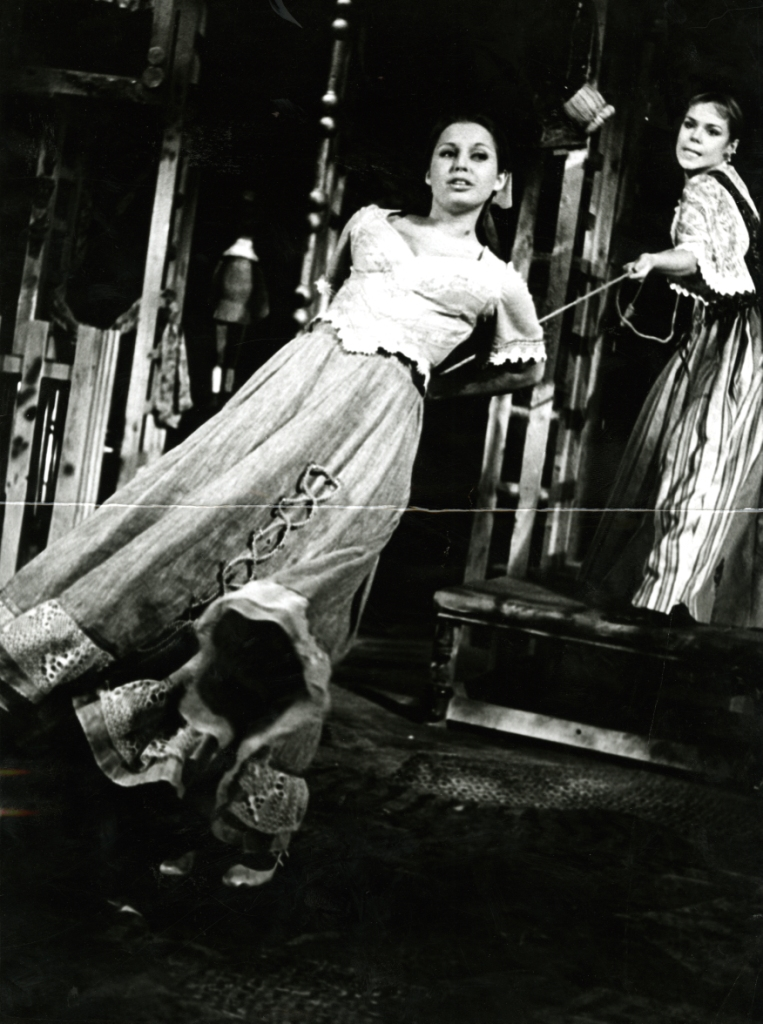
- Lenka Pichlíková as Bianca and Dagmar Veškrnová as Katharina in The Taming of the Shrew (Jiří Wolker's Theatre Prague)
- Created by: William Shakespeare
- Based on: taming of the shrew
- Portrayed by: Linda Arvidson (silent, 1908); Dorothy Jordan (film, 1929); Natasha Pyne (film, 1967); Susan Penhaligon (TV, 1980); Laura Boccanera (Italian film, 2004)

In-universe information
- Family: Katherine Minola (sister); Baptista Minola (father); Lucentio (husband)

Bianca Minola is a character in Shakespeare's The Taming of the Shrew (c.1590–1594).

== Origin ==
The play is similar to Don Juan Manuel's 14th-century Castilian tale of the "young man who married a very strong and fiery woman". The characters Lucentio and Bianca are part of a subplot which derives from Ludovico Ariosto's I Suppositi.

== Role in the play ==
Bianca Minola is the younger daughter of Baptista Minola and sister to Katherina (Kate) Minola. Unlike Kate, Bianca is very obedient and sweet-tempered, causing her to have a good number of suitors. Her father, however, declares that none may marry Bianca until Kate is wed. Desperate to win Bianca's hand in marriage, one of her suitors Hortensio gets his friend Petruchio, who is willing enough, to marry Kate so that Bianca would be allowed to marry. Hortensio then attempts to woo her in the disguise of a tutor named Litio. Bianca, however, falls in love with another suitor, Lucentio (also in the guise of a tutor 'Cambio'). The pair are married and at the wedding feast, Petruchio suggests a contest between himself, Lucentio, and Hortensio: they each send for their wives, and whoever's wife responds the most obediently wins. Despite Lucentio's faith in her obedience, Bianca does not come when summoned, saying that she is too busy. When she is forcefully brought to Lucentio by Kate, Bianca insists that her husband was a fool to set store by her obedience.

Throughout the play, there is evidence of sibling rivalry between Bianca and Kate as Kate accuses Bianca of being their father's "treasure" and the one that he wishes to have married first. In one scene, Kate ties Bianca's hands and whips her, in an attempt to discover which of her suitors Bianca likes the best. Bianca, however, insists that she has yet to meet a suitor that she truly loves.

== Performances ==
In the musical adaptation Kiss Me, Kate, The Taming of the Shrew is a play-within-the-play, and Bianca is played by an actress called Lois Lane. In the 1953 film version Bianca/Lois is played by Ann Miller. In the 1967 film version of the original play, Bianca is portrayed by Natasha Pyne.

In the modern film version 10 Things I Hate About You, Bianca is played by Larisa Oleynik. In the ABC Family television series 10 Things I Hate About You, Bianca is played by Meaghan Jette Martin.
