= Harold Lang (dancer) =

American dancer, singer and actor

- Born: December 21, 1920; Daly City, California
- Died: July 26, 1985 (aged 64); Chico, California, US
- Occupations: Dancer; singer; actor
- Known for: Professor of Dance at California State University, Chico

Harold Lang (December 21, 1920 – July 26, 1985) was an American dancer, singer and actor.

== Early life ==
Harold Lang was born on December 21, 1920 in Daly City, California. As a youth, he delivered telegrams in the San Francisco area. He participated in several dance studies but took an extended hiatus for several years. In 1940, while delivering a telegram backstage at a San Francisco theater during a ballet rehearsal by the San Francisco Opera Ballet, he was inspired to resume training the next day under Willam Christensen at the San Francisco Opera Ballet.

== Career ==
Lang began his professional career as a ballet dancer, dancing with the Kosloff Ballet before making his professional debut in 1938 with the San Francisco Ballet and then went on to perform with the Ballet Russe de Monte Carlo and the American Ballet Theatre (then called Ballet Theatre) from 1941 to 1945. While at ABT, he originated roles in Jerome Robbins' Fancy Free and Interplay, in addition to performing in ballets by George Balanchine, David Lichine, Léonide Massine and Antony Tudor.

Beginning in the late 1940s, Lang transitioned from ballet to musical theater. He made his Broadway debut in the short-lived Mr. Strauss Goes to Boston (1945), then had more success as a soloist in Three to Make Ready (1946) and Look, Ma, I'm Dancin'! (1948). Lang's first major role, however, was as Bill Calhoun/Lucentio in the original production of Kiss Me, Kate (1948) — although he did not always get along with composer Cole Porter. His second major Broadway appearance was the role of Joey in the 1952 revival of Pal Joey.

Other Broadway appearances included Make a Wish (1951), Shangri-La (1956), Ziegfeld Follies of 1957, and I Can Get It for You Wholesale (1962). Lang also toured as the Jester in Once Upon a Mattress.

In the long-running Kiss Me, Kate, Lang (as Bill) performed his showstopping solo number, "Bianca", and also performed "We Open in Venice" (as Lucentio) with Alfred Drake (as Petruchio), Patricia Morison (as Katharine) and Lisa Kirk (as Bianca). Lang also performed "Tom, Dick or Harry" (as Lucentio) with Edwin Clay (as Gremio), Charles Wood (as Hortensio) and Lisa Kirk (as Bianca).

Although he appeared on television in the early 1950s, Lang made no commercial films. It was reported 20th Century-Fox wanted him for the role of Vera-Ellen's character's boyfriend Mike in Three Little Girls in Blue (1946) but he had to refuse because of a stage commitment in Three to Make Ready (1946).

The New York Public Library has archival films of Lang's work in Fancy Free and Interplay. He portrayed John Sappington Marmaduke "Bubber" Dinwiddie, the brother of Martha Dinwiddie Butterfield in the Patrick Dennis mock-bio First Lady. Lang is included in Ben Bagley's 'Jerome Kern Revisited' album, singing four songs. Both Arthur Laurents and Gore Vidal reported having affairs with Lang.

From 1970 until his death in 1985, Lang was a professor of dance at California State University in Chico, California.

== Death ==
Lang died on July 26, 1985, at the age of 64 from pancreatic cancer in Chico, California.

== Stage appearances ==
- Fancy Free (April 18, 1944) (Metropolitan Opera House)
- Mr. Strauss Goes to Boston (September 6–15, 1945) (Broadway)
- Three to Make Ready (March 7 – December 14, 1946) (Broadway)
- Look Ma, I'm Dancin'! (January 29 – July 10, 1948) (Broadway)
- Kiss Me, Kate (cast member from December 30, 1948 – July 28, 1950, replaced by understudy Danny Daniels when show moved to Shubert Theatre) (Broadway)
- Make a Wish (April 18 – July 14, 1951) (Broadway)
- Pal Joey (January 3, 1952 – April 18, 1953; 1954) (Broadway, national tour and London)
- The Time of Your Life (January 19–30, 1955) (Broadway)
- Shangri-La (June 13 – 30, 1956) (Broadway)
- Ziegfeld Follies of 1957 (March 1 – June 15, 1957) (Broadway)
- On the Town (January 15 – March 15, 1959) (Off-Broadway revival, Carnegie Hall Playhouse) (as Gabey)
- Oklahoma! (1959) (Dayton, Ohio) (as Will Parker)
- Once Upon a Mattress (1960–1961) (national tour)
- I Can Get It for You Wholesale (March 22 – December 8, 1962) (Broadway)
- Song of Norway (1963) (Warren, Ohio)
- Show Boat (1963) (Milwaukee) (as Frank Schultz)
- Little Me (1964) (Gaithersburg, Maryland)
- No Strings (1964) (Gaithersburg, Maryland)
- The Decline and Fall of the Entire World as Seen Through the Eyes of Cole Porter Revisited (1965) (Off-Broadway)
- The Gershwin Years (1973) (national tour)

== Discography ==
- Pal Joey (original Broadway soundtrack with Vivienne Segal) (1951, Columbia Masterworks)
- Kiss Me Kate (original Broadway soundtrack with Alfred Drake, Patricia Morison, Lisa Kirk) (1967, Capitol Records)
- Ben Bagley's Jerome Kern Revisited (with Nancy Andrews, Barbara Cook, Bobby Short, Cy Young, Ben Bagley) (1965, CBS Records)
- Ben Bagley's The Decline and Fall of the Entire World as Seen Through the Eyes of Cole Porter (with Ben Bagley, Kaye Ballard, Carmen Alvarez, William Hickey, Elmarie Wendel) (1973, Columbia Masterworks)
- Kiss Me Kate (re-issue) (with Alfred Drake, Saint Subber & Lemuel Ayers, Pembroke Davenport, Robert Russell Bennett, Bella & Samuel Spewack, Lisa Kirk, Patricia Morison) (Columbia Masterworks)

== Filmography ==
- Musical Comedy Time (1950)
- The Bert Parks Show (1950)
