= Lisa Kirk =

American actress (1925–1990)

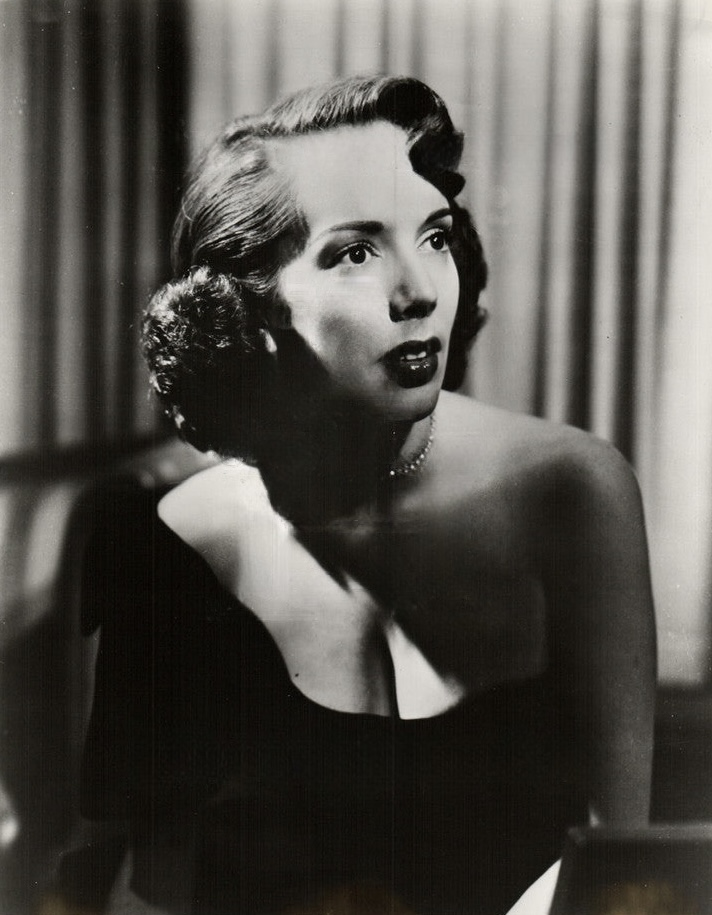
- Kirk in 1951
- Born: Elsie Kirk; February 25, 1925; Brownsville, Pennsylvania, U.S.
- Died: November 11, 1990 (aged 65); New York City, U.S.
- Occupations: Actress; singer
- Spouse: Robert Wells (m. 1949)

Lisa Kirk (born Elsie Kirk; February 25, 1925 – November 11, 1990) was an American actress and singer noted for her comic talents and rich contralto (her voice was called a husky alto).

== Early life ==
Born in Brownsville, Pennsylvania as Elsie Kirk, she was raised in Roscoe, Pennsylvania.

Kirk enrolled as a law student at the University of Pittsburgh, but abandoned her studies when she was offered a spot in the chorus line at the Versailles nightclub in Manhattan.

== Career ==
Kirk studied theatre at HB Studio in New York City and made her Broadway debut in Allegro in 1947. In 1948, she gained critical acclaim for her performance as Lois Lane/Bianca in Kiss Me, Kate, for which Kirk recounted learning the songs (from Cole Porter) and performing them for investors before performing them in the theatre. The reviewer for CastAlbumReviews.com wrote: "As Lois/Bianca, Lisa Kirk acts and sings her numbers impeccably; her performance of 'Why Can't You Behave?' is unsurpassed as her sultry voice pours over great lines such as, 'There I'll care for you forever/Well, at least till you dig my grave'."

In Mack and Mabel (1974), she played an older actress who becomes a star tap dancer, and was noted by Clive Barnes to be "particularly fine". Additional Broadway credits include Here's Love (1963), Me Jack, You Jill (closed during previews in 1976), and a 1984 revival of Noël Coward's Design for Living.

Kirk's only feature film work was dubbing the singing voice for Rosalind Russell's character Rose Hovick in Gypsy (except for "Mr. Goldstone" and the first half of "Rose's Turn"). It was rumored that Kirk had also dubbed Lucille Ball's singing voice in Mame (1974). However, Ball denied this on The Merv Griffin Show, saying, "She's not dubbing my voice because no one can."

Kirk was active in the early days of television, appearing in such anthology series as Studio One, where she co-starred in The Taming of the Shrew on June 5, 1950. She appeared on Kraft Television Theatre, The Colgate Comedy Hour, and General Electric Theater. In later years, she was a guest star on sitcoms such as Bewitched and The Courtship of Eddie's Father, as well as variety series like The Ed Sullivan Show, The Hollywood Palace, and The Dean Martin Show.

Kirk frequently appeared at the Persian Room in the Plaza Hotel. She also appeared at New York City's Rainbow and Stars nightclub. In a review of her act at Rainbow and Stars, in April 1989, The New York Times music critic John S. Wilson wrote that Kirk's "long career has given her polish, presence and a solid foundation of songs by Rodgers and Hammerstein, Cole Porter and Jerry Herman with which she is associated. She has maintained such a trim structure that she can do justice to a song called 'Is That Really Her Figure?' And although her voice may not be as full-bodied as it once was, she has a warm, easy projection that gives sensitivity and color to her songs."

In addition to Kirk's appearances on original cast albums and compilations of Broadway performances, she recorded a number of solo recordings, including Lisa Kirk Sings At The Plaza (1959) from MGM Records. A posthumous complication CD I Feel A Song Comin' On was released in 2004.

Kirk may be best known for her roles in the original Broadway productions of Rodgers and Hammerstein's Allegro and Cole Porter's Kiss Me, Kate. Bloom and Vlastnik wrote in their book Broadway Musicals: the 101 Greatest Shows of All Time that Kirk "hit the jackpot again", introducing "Why Can't You Behave" and "Always True to You (in My Fashion)". Another popular number was the upbeat "Tom, Dick or Harry", performed with Harold Lang as Lucentio, Edwin Clay as Gremio and Charles Wood as Hortensio (suitors to Kirk's Bianca). Lewis Nichols wrote: "Having startled the town last season by singing 'The Gentleman is a Dope' as though she meant it, Miss Kirk is captivating ... this year as a fully accredited hoyden with a sense of humor."

== Personal life ==
From 1949 until her death, Kirk was married to sketch artist and famed songwriter Robert Wells, who co-wrote "The Christmas Song (Chestnuts Roasting on an Open Fire)" with Mel Torme. They had no children.

In 1950, Kirk's mother, Elsie Kirk, filed suit against her daughter for failing to abide to what she said was an agreement that the two of them share her earnings. Lisa Kirk insisted no such agreement existed.

In 1968, Kirk was involved in an automobile accident, in which she substained whiplash that caused nerve damage in her lower back. In September 1972, after four years of physical and voice rehabilitation, Kirk made a comeback at the St. Regis nightclub in New York City.

== Death ==
A non-smoker, Kirk died of lung cancer on November 11, 1990, at the Memorial-Sloan Cancer Center in Manhattan.

== Radio appearances ==
Year	Program	Episode/source
1952	Musical Comedy Theater	Yolanda and the Thief

== Television ==
Year	Title	Role	Notes
1967	The Monkees	Gloria	S1:E21, "The Prince and the Paupers"
1967	Bewitched	Madame Maruska	S3:E30, "How To Fail In Business With All Kinds of Help"
