= Katherina Minola =

- The Taming of the Shrew character
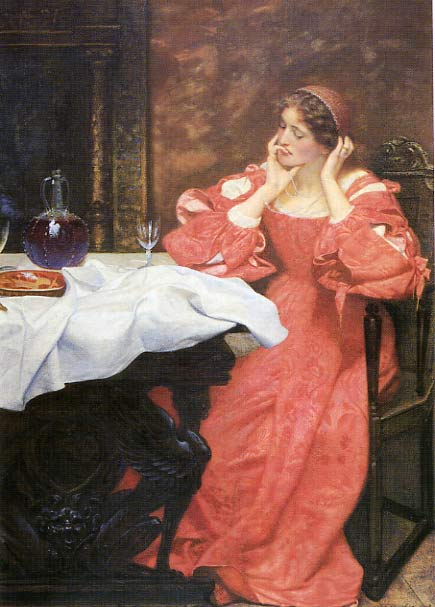
- The Shrew Katherina by Edward Robert Hughes (1898).
- Created by: William Shakespeare
- Portrayed by: Florence Lawrence (1908); Mary Pickford (1929); Elizabeth Taylor (1967)

In-universe information
- Spouse: Petruchio
- Relatives: Bianca Minola (younger sister); Baptista Minola (father)

Katherina "Kate" Minola is a fictional character in William Shakespeare's play The Taming of the Shrew. Referred to in the play as the titular "shrew" and the "ingenue", the play focuses on Katherina's taming by Petruchio into a more conventional role of a good wife. She is the elder daughter of Baptista Minola and the sister of Bianca Minola.

== Role in the play ==
Katherina Minola is the older daughter of Baptista Minola and the sister of Bianca. Many men have deemed Kate to be unsuitable for marriage as she does not conform to the societal standards of what a good wife should be. Baptista also declares that Bianca may not marry until Kate has been married, which causes some outrage and plotting from Bianca's suitors. Baptista's declaration motivates Petruchio to pursue marriage with Kate, he is encouraged by Hortensio (who is eager to marry Bianca). In the first encounter between Kate and Petruchio, Petruchio manages to match Kate's temper and convinces her father that she loves him but only pretends to hate him. Kate stays surprisingly quiet when Petruchio declares they will be married the following Sunday. The silence from Kate and Petruchio's words is enough for Baptista, and the two are wed, though Petruchio arrives late and forces Kate to leave the wedding feast early.

Now, at this point, Petruchio attempts to "tame" Kate in several ways. Kate is frightened by the way that Petruchio yells at his servants, she is kept from sleeping and eating, with Petruchio saying that each dish brought is not good enough for her. He repeatedly told her that because he loves her so much, he cannot let her endure substandard food or sleeping conditions.

On the way to Padua to visit Baptista, Kate is further humiliated and broken down as Petruchio forces her to say that the sun is the moon, and that an old man is a beautiful woman. Kate's will has mostly been broken down by this point, likely due to the lack of food and rest. She therefore agrees with everything her husband says. The two embrace and continue to Padua, where Bianca and Lucentio announce they are to be married.

At the wedding feast of Bianca and Lucentio, Kate, Bianca, and "the widow", who is married to Hortensio are each called by their husbands in a competition to see who has the most obedient wife. Kate is the only one who responds, and at Petruchio's command, she brings in the other two women. Kate then delivers a speech urging the women to listen to their husbands.

There is a very clear sibling rivalry between Bianca and Kate. Kate, at one point, accuses Bianca of being their father's "treasure" and the one that he wishes to have married first. In Act II Scene I, Kate ties Bianca's hands and whips her as she is attempting to discover which of the suitors Bianca likes best.

== Performances ==
Florence Lawrence plays Kate in the first screen adaptation of the play in 1908, directed by D.W. Griffith. Mary Pickford then plays her in the 1929 "talkie" version alongside Douglas Fairbanks and Dorothy Jordan as Petruchio and Bianca. In the 1967 film, Kate is portrayed by famed actress Elizabeth Taylor and Petruchio is played by Taylor's then-husband Richard Burton with Natasha Pyne as Bianca.

In the musical remake, Kiss Me Kate (1953 film version), she is portrayed by Kathryn Grayson.

In the modern remake 10 Things I Hate About You (1999) Kate becomes Kat Stratford and is played by Julia Stiles. There is also an ABC Family television series with the same title as the 1999 film, and Kat Stratford is played by Lindsey Shaw.

The Royal Shakespeare Company's 2019 production gives the play a new twist, as the cast is gender-bent; meaning that the role of Kate is now played by a man (Actor Joseph Arkley) and the other traditional masculine characters are now portrayed by women.
