= Stephanie J. Block =

American actress and singer (born 1972)

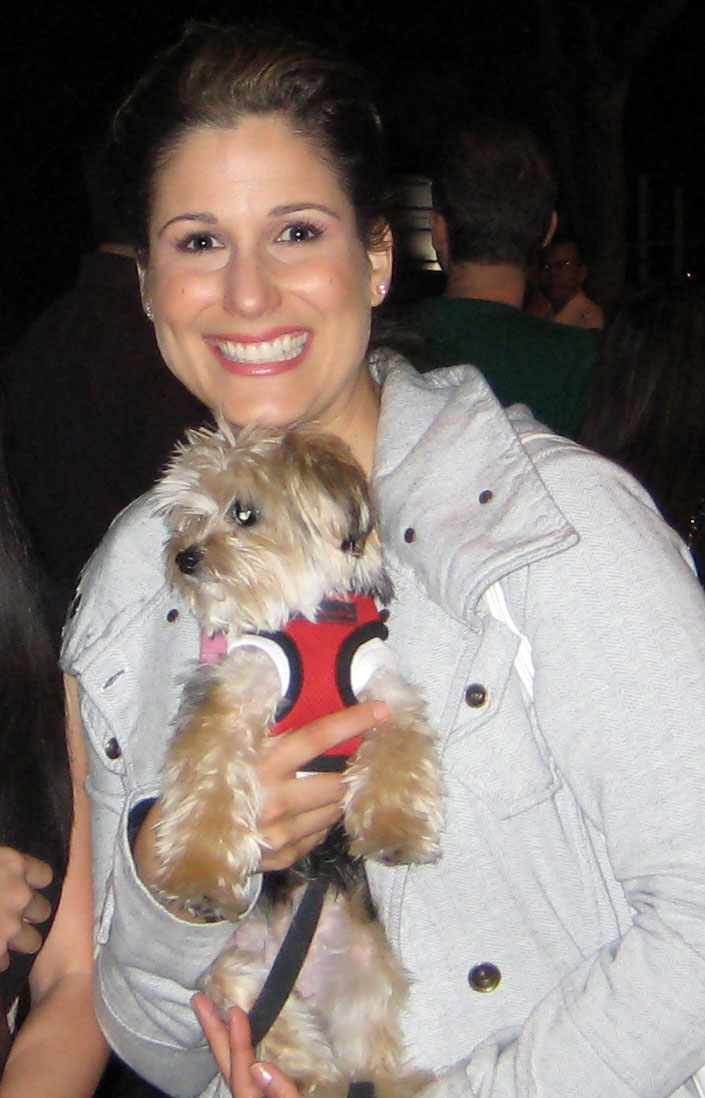
- Block in Los Angeles in 2008
- Born: Stephanie Janette Block; September 19, 1972 (age 54); Brea, California, U.S.
- Occupations: Actress; singer
- Years active: 1994–present
- Known for: Wicked; Falsettos; The Cher Show; Into the Woods
- Spouse: Sebastian Arcelus (m. 2007)
- Children: 1
- Website: stephaniejblock.com

Stephanie Janette Block (born September 19, 1972) is an American actress and singer, best known for her work in Broadway theatre.

Block made her Broadway debut in 2003, originating the role of Liza Minnelli in The Boy from Oz. After reading for the role of Elphaba during the early stages of Wicked in 2000, Block became the first actress to play the role in the show's first U.S. national tour in 2005. She later reprised the role of Elphaba on Broadway from 2007 to 2008.

A three-time Tony Award nominee and six-time Drama Desk Award nominee, Block won the 2019 Tony Award for Best Actress in a Musical and Drama Desk Award for Outstanding Actress in a Musical for her lead performance in The Cher Show. Block held onto the title of Best Actress for over 2 years as a result of the COVID-19 Broadway shutdown. She also received Tony and Drama Desk nominations for her performances in The Mystery of Edwin Drood (2013) and Falsettos (2016). She received Drama Desk nominations for her performances in the Off-Broadway productions of By the Way, Meet Vera Stark (2011) and Little Miss Sunshine (2013), as well as in the Broadway production of 9 to 5 (2009).

Additionally, Block has appeared on numerous cast recordings and released a solo album, This Place I Know, in 2009. Her television credits include recurring roles on Madam Secretary (2017) and Rise (2018).

Block starred as The Baker's Wife in a Broadway revival of Stephen Sondheim's Into the Woods. She reprised the role in the U.S. national tour. Block made her London stage debut starring in a 2024 Barbican Theatre revival of Kiss Me, Kate.

== Early life and education ==
Block was born on September 19, 1972, in Brea, California, and has one sister, Renée. Her mother, Rosemarie (née Garritano), worked for the local school district, and her father, Steven Block, was a welfare fraud investigator. She was raised Catholic and is of German and Italian descent. She graduated High school at the Orange County School of the Arts at Los Alamitos High School.

== Acting career ==
Block started her professional musical theater career with regional theater, appearing in many productions including Funny Girl, Crazy for You, Oliver!, James Joyce's The Dead, and Bells Are Ringing. Block was additionally the original Belle in the Disneyland production of Beauty and the Beast and did voice work for numerous commercials, including the singing voice of Barbie.

In early 2000, Block read the part of Elphaba in the first reading of the new musical Wicked. After a few months of reading, she was replaced by Idina Menzel, a decision that left Block devastated, but accepting of the decision that had been made to cast a more experienced performer in the role. She was Menzel's understudy in the San Francisco tryout in 2003, but she left the show prior to Broadway when she was offered a lead role in a new Broadway musical, The Boy from Oz.

Block made her Broadway debut in 2003, playing the role of Liza Minnelli opposite Hugh Jackman's Peter Allen in the show. The show received mixed reviews but proved to be a hit with audiences, playing on Broadway for close to a year. The musical received several Tony Award nominations, including a nomination for Best Musical.

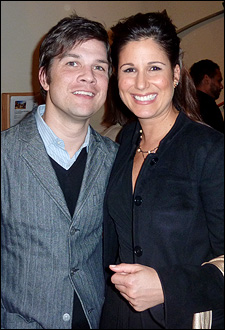
Block with Stephen Oremus, with whom she worked in Wicked.

In spring 2005, Block originated the role of Elphaba in the first national tour of Wicked. She was awarded both the 2006 Helen Hayes Award and the 2007 Carbonell Award for Best Actress in a Non-Resident Production for this role. Block received great reviews for a show-stopping performance. After performing with the tour for a year, Block left the production in March 2006 and was replaced by Julia Murney.

In 2007 Block performed in the title role of the new Broadway musical The Pirate Queen, with music written by Claude-Michel Schönberg and Alain Boublil. Block was praised by critics, such as Ben Brantley from The New York Times, for giving a "truly felt, realistic, performance". Plagued by insufficient ticket sales and harsh reviews, the show opened in April and barely played for two months at the Hilton Theatre, closing in June. Later that year Block reprised the role of Elphaba in Wicked on Broadway beginning October 9, 2007, where she replaced Julia Murney. She left the production after eight months, on June 15, 2008, and was succeeded by Kerry Ellis.

Block starred alongside Allison Janney, Megan Hilty, and Marc Kudisch in the musical adaptation of the 1980 film 9 to 5. The production was directed by Joe Mantello with music written by Dolly Parton. The show opened on Broadway in April 2009 at the Marquis Theatre and closed in September 2009. Block starred as Judy Bernly, the frazzled divorcée, the role played by Jane Fonda in the film. For this role Block was nominated for the Drama Desk Award for Outstanding Actress in a Musical.

In 2009, Block released her debut album through PS Classics titled This Place I Know. Although the album failed to chart, it was a hit with critics with some hailing it as the best album that has come out of the Broadway community in some time.

She has done concert work in London's West End. In February 2010 she performed live at the New Players Theatre in London.

Block was seen as Grizabella in the Municipal Opera Production production of Cats, which ran from July 19–25, 2010. Block also starred as Sonia Walsk alongside Jason Alexander in the Reprise Theatre Company's production of They're Playing Our Song, which played at the UCLA Freud Playhouse for two weeks from September 28 – October 10, 2010.

Block made her off-Broadway debut as Gloria Mitchell in the play By the Way, Meet Vera Stark by Pulitzer Prize winner Lynn Nottage alongside Karen Olivo and David Garrison. By the Way, Meet Vera Stark played at Second Stage Theatre through June 12, 2011. Entertainment Weekly wrote that Block's performance in the show was, "terrifically over-the-top". She received a nomination for the Drama Desk Award for Outstanding Featured Actress in a Play.

Block starred as Reno Sweeney in the Broadway revival of Anything Goes, first playing the role for three weeks in November 2011 while Sutton Foster was away filming a pilot episode. Block performed with co-star Colin Donnell on the 2011 CBS Thanksgiving Day Parade. Block returned to the role on March 15, 2012, as Foster left the production permanently on March 11. She remained with the show until its closure on July 8, 2012.

Block performed the lead role in Roundabout Theatre Company's production of The Mystery of Edwin Drood, which ran from November 13, 2012, to March 10, 2013. For this role, she was nominated for another Drama Desk Award for Outstanding Actress in a Musical and received a nomination for the Tony Award for Best Actress in a Musical.

From November 14 to December 15, 2013, Block appeared in the Off-Broadway production of Little Miss Sunshine at Second Stage Theatre as Sheryl Hoover. For this role, she received a nomination for the Drama Desk Award for Outstanding Featured Actress in a Musical.

Block played Trina in the 2016 Broadway revival of Falsettos, directed by James Lapine. She was joined by Christian Borle and Andrew Rannells who played Marvin and Whizzer, respectively. The musical began previews on September 29, 2016, and opened officially on October 27, 2016. The limited run ended on January 8, 2017. For her performance, Block received rave reviews, with The New York Times writing that she is "better here than ever". She received nominations for the Tony Award for Best Featured Actress in a Musical, the Drama Desk Award for Outstanding Featured Actress in a Musical, and the Outer Critics Circle Award for Outstanding Featured Actress in a Musical.

Block had a recurring role in the NBC series Rise, playing Patricia, a devout Catholic who ends up at odds with her husband over their son's involvement in a controversial high school play.

Block played singer Cher in the biomusical The Cher Show. The musical played an out-of-town tryout in Chicago at the Oriental Theatre, beginning on June 12, 2018, and running through July 15. The production opened on Broadway at the Neil Simon Theatre in December 2018. For this performance, Block won the 2019 Drama Desk Award for Outstanding Actress in a Musical and the Tony Award for Best Actress in a Musical. She also won an Outer Critics Circle Award and was nominated for a Drama League Award. The Cher Show ended its run on August 18, 2019.

On August 1, 2021, Stephanie launched the Stages podcast, with Marylee Graffeo Fairbanks.

In August 2022, it was announced that Block would replace Sara Bareilles as the Baker's Wife in the Broadway revival of Into the Woods beginning September 6 of that year and would star alongside her husband Sebastian Arcelus, who played the Baker. She then starred alongside Brian d'Arcy James, who returned to the show after Arcelus's limited engagement ended the following month. Block and Arcelus reprised their roles in the production's U.S. national tour, which launched in early 2023. Before that, Arcelus once again starred alongside Block in the Broadway production for its final week of performances in January 2023.

Block starred as Norma Desmond opposite Derek Klena as Joe Gillis in the Kennedy Center production of Sunset Boulevard from February 1–8, 2023.

On June 13, 2023, Block announced she was back in the studio recording a new album, set for release in the fall - her first full-length solo record in almost 15 years. On September 26, 2023, Block announced her first holiday album, "Merry Christmas, Darling" which was released on November 3, being promoted by Block's rendition of Sleigh Ride, released as a single on October 6. The album contains duets with her husband and daughter, as well as new songs specially written for the occasion.

On Dec 19, 2023, the 300th episode of The Theatre Podcast with Alan Seales was released, featuring Block as the guest.

Block made her London theatre debut in a revival of Kiss Me, Kate at the Barbican Theatre for an engagement lasting from June through September 2024. The production was filmed on stage with a cinema release in the UK and internationally on November 17, 2024. It is also aired on PBS as part of its Great Performances series on May 30, 2025. She received two nominations at the Helen Hayes Awards for her performances in Into the Woods and Sunset Boulevard and won an award for the latter.

== Personal life ==
Block married actor Sebastian Arcelus on October 25, 2007. Arcelus starred alongside Block in the first national tour of Wicked as the Fiyero replacement from January to March 2006 and again on Broadway from October to December 2007. They have one daughter, Vivienne Helena Arcelus, who was born January 19, 2015.

== Acting credits ==
=== Theatre ===
Year	Title	Role	Theatre	Director(s)	Ref.
1994	The Will Rogers Follies	Ziegfeld's Favorite	Will Rogers Theatre	Steven Minning	
1995	Godspell	Robin/Dance Captain	U.S. National Tour		
1997	Crazy for You	Polly	La Mirada Theatre for the Performing Arts		
1997	Damn Yankees	Gloria Thorpe	Sacramento Music Circus		
1997	South Pacific	Nellie Forbush	Cabrillo Music Theatre		
1998	Guys and Dolls	Sarah Brown	Civic Light Opera of South Bay Cities		
1999	Bye Bye Birdie	Rosie	Sacramento Music Circus		
1999	Bells Are Ringing	Gwynne	Reprise Theatre Company		
2000	Call Me Madam		UCLA Freud Playhouse	John Bowab	
2000	James Joyce's The Dead	Mary Jane Morkan	Kennedy Center's Eisenhower Theatre	Charles Prince	
2000	Funny Girl	Fanny Brice	Thousand Oaks Civic Arts Plaza		
2001	Triumph of Love	Corine	Santa Barbara Civic Light Opera		
2001	Oliver!	Nancy	Paramount Theatre	Scott Thompson and Richard Byron	
2001	Crazy for You	Polly	Redondo Beach Performing Arts Center	Alan Coats	
2001	Haven	Ruth Gruber	Gindi Auditorium	Michael Unger	
2002	The Grass Harp	Baby Love Dallas	Pasadena Playhouse	Kay Cole	
2002	Fiddler on the Roof	Tzeitel	Pittsburgh Civic Light Opera	Glenn Casale	
2002	I Love a Piano	Ginger	Temple Hoyne Buell Theatre	Ray Roderick	
2003	Let Me Sing	Molly	Charlotte Repertory Theatre	Michael Bush	
2003	Wicked	Ensemble (u/s Elphaba)	Curran Theatre	Joe Mantello	
2003–04	**The Boy from Oz**	**Liza Minnelli**	**Imperial Theatre**	Philip Wm McKinley	
2005–06	Wicked	Elphaba	U.S. National Tour	Joe Mantello	
2006	**The Pirate Queen**	**Grace O'Malley**	Cadillac Palace Theatre	Frank Galati	
2007	**The Pirate Queen**	**Grace O'Malley**	**Hilton Theatre**	Frank Galati	
2007–08	**Wicked**	**Elphaba** (replacement)	**Gershwin Theatre**	Joe Mantello	
2008	**9 to 5**	**Judy Bernly**	Ahmanson Theatre	Joe Mantello	
2009	**9 to 5**	**Judy Bernly**	**Marquis Theatre**	Joe Mantello	
2010	Cats	Grizabella	The Muny	Suzanne Viverito	
2010	They're Playing Our Song	Sonia Walsk	Freud Playhouse	Lonny Price	
2011	By the Way, Meet Vera Stark	Gloria Mitchell	Second Stage Theatre	Jo Bonney	
2011–12	**Anything Goes**	**Reno Sweeney** (replacement)	**Stephen Sondheim Theatre**	Kathleen Marshall	
2012–13	**The Mystery of Edwin Drood**	**Edwin Drood / Alice Nutting**	**Studio 54**	Scott Ellis	
2013	Little Miss Sunshine	Sheryl Hoover	Second Stage Theatre	James Lapine	
2016–17	**Falsettos**	**Trina**	**Walter Kerr Theatre**	James Lapine	
2017	Brigadoon	Meg Brockie	New York City Center	Christopher Wheeldon	
2018	**The Cher Show**	**Star**	Oriental Theatre	Jason Moore	
2018–19	**The Cher Show**	**Star**	**Neil Simon Theatre**	Jason Moore	
2022–23	**Into the Woods**	**The Baker's Wife** (replacement)	**St. James Theatre**	Lear deBessonet	
2023	Sunset Boulevard	Norma Desmond	Kennedy Center	Sammi Cannold	
2023	Into the Woods	The Baker's Wife	U.S. National Tour	Lear deBessonet	
2024	**Kiss Me, Kate**	**Lilli Vanessi / Katharine**	**Barbican Theatre**	Bartlett Sher	
2026–27	**Falsettos**	**Trina**	Carnegie Hall	Vadim Feichtner	
2027	**Falsettos**	**Trina**	**London Palladium**	Vadim Feichtner	

• Credits in bold indicate Broadway or London/West End production(s)

=== Film ===
Year	Title	Role	Ref.
2006	James Marshall's Cinderella	Narrator	
2022	iMordecai	Netta	
2024	Kiss Me, Kate	Lilli Vanessi / Katharine	

=== Television ===
Year	Title	Role	Notes	Ref.
Unknown	Life Goes On	Sarah	Recurring	
2005	The Tonight Show with Jay Leno	Elphaba	Episode: July 18, 2005	
2013	Homeland	Patricia Cooper	Episode: "Game On"	
2014	It Could Be Worse	Jenny	3 episodes	
2016	Orange Is the New Black	CO Francine Dennis	3 episodes	
2017	Madam Secretary	Abby Whitman	4 episodes	
2017	Falsettos: Live from Lincoln Center	Trina	Filmed stage production	
2018	Rise	Patricia Saunders	Recurring role, 8 episodes	
2019	Bluff City Law	Sarah Carpenter	Episode: “American Epidemic”	

== Concerts ==
- Stephanie J. Block at Cafe Carlyle at The Carlyle (February 11–15, 2020)
- Broadway Stands Up for Freedom: We The People at Town Hall (2018)
- The Pros and Con-cert at The Cabaret in Indianapolis (2018)
- Stephanie J. Block Live at Lincoln Center filmed for PBS (2018)
- It's Christmastime In The City with Brian D'Arcy James and the New York Pops (2015)
- On Broadway with Andrew Rannells and the New York Pops (2014)
- Tapestry of Song and Voices of Youth (The Indianapolis Children's Choir) with Henry Leck, Josh Pedde and Cheryl West (2014)
- Do You Hear the People Sing? with Peter Lockyer, Terrence Mann, Lea Salonga, Marie Zamora, the Indianapolis Symphony Orchestra and Symphonic Choir (2011)
- Broadway on the Beach with Doug LaBrecque and the Reno Philharmonic Orchestra (2011)
- Pops on the River: Summer Lovin' with Doug LaBrecque and the Reno Philharmonic Orchestra (2011)
- Broadway & the American Songbook (Wicked Divas) with Julia Murney and the Boston Pops (2011)
- Broadway Voices solo concert in Garner, NC (2011)
- Wicked Divas with Julia Murney and the Utah Symphony Orchestra (2011)
- Wicked Divas with Julia Murney and the Odgen Symphony Ballet (2011)
- Marvin Hamlisch: Broadway's Greatest Moments at The Krannert Center (2011)
- Solo concert presented by the Austin Cabaret Theatre (2011)
- Wicked Divas with Erin Mackey and the Cleveland Pops (2010)
- The Best of Broadway with the Ridgefield Symphony Orchestra (2010)
- Wicked Divas with Julia Murney and the Columbus Symphony Orchestra (2010)
- Don't Stop Believing at the Cobb Energy Performing Arts Centre in Atlanta, GA (2010)
- Broadway Comes to Tampa (2010)
- Stephanie J. Block in Concert at The New Players Theatre (2010)
- xoxoXMAS at Birdland (2009)
- Scott Alan: Just Me...And Them at the Leicester Square Theatre (2009)
- True Colors Cabaret (2009)
- Nothing Like a Dame at New World Stages (2009)
- Visa Signature Tony Awards Preview Concert at the Hudson Theatre (2009)
- Defying Inequality at the Gershwin Theatre (2009)
- The Yellow Brick Road Not Taken at the Gershwin Theatre (2008)
- Mr. Green's Opus at Birdland (2008)
- Block Party at Birdland (2007)
- Billy Stritch and the Girls at Birdland (2007)
- The Broadway Musicals of 1925 (2007)
- An Evening with Andrew Lippa (2006)
- Block Party at Birdland (2006)
- Broadway Comes to Tampa (2006)
- Valentine at Birdland (2005)
- All Smiles at Birdland (2004)

== Discography ==
=== Cast recordings ===
- The Boy from Oz – Original Broadway Cast (2003)
- The Pirate Queen – Original Broadway Cast Recording (2007)
- 9 to 5 –The Musical – Original Broadway Cast Recording (2009)
- The Mystery of Edwin Drood – The 2013 New Broadway Cast Recording (2013)
- Falsettos – 2016 New Broadway Cast Recording (2016)
- Lerner & Loewe's Brigadoon – New York City Center 2017 Cast Recording (2018)
- The Cher Show – Original Broadway Cast Recording (2019)

=== Collaborative projects ===
- The Broadway Musicals of 1925 (2003)
- Broadway's Carols for a Cure, Volume 5 (2003)
- Broadway's Carols for a Cure, Volume 6 (2004)
- Broadway Unplugged 2004 (2004)
- A Joyful Christmas (2004)
- Thankful (2004)
- The Broadway Musicals Cut-Outs (2007)
- Dreaming Wide Awake: The Music of Scott Alan (2007)
- Wicked: 5th Anniversary Cast Recording (2008)
- Chasing the Day: The Music of Will Van Dyke (2010)
- Sorta Love Songs: The Songs of Scott Burkell and Paul Loesel (2010)
- Wicked: Deluxe Edition (2013)
- Ahrens & Flaherty: Nice Fighting You (2014)

=== Solo albums ===
- This Place I Know (2009)
- Merry Christmas, Darling (2023)

== Accolades ==
Year	Award	Category	Show	Result	Ref.
2000	Robby Award	Best Actress	Funny Girl	Won	
2001	Austin Critics Table Award	Best Actress	Oliver!	Won	
2002	Ovation Award	Best Actress	Crazy for You	Nominated	
2002	Robby Award	Best Actress in a Supporting Role	Triumph of Love	Won	
2006	Helen Hayes Award	Best Actress in a Leading Role – Non-Resident Production	Wicked	Won	
2007	Drama League Award	Distinguished Performance	The Pirate Queen	Nominated	
2007	Broadway.com Audience Awards	Favorite Diva Performance	The Pirate Queen	Nominated	
2007	Carbonell Award	Best Actress in a Non-Resident Production	Wicked	Won	
2008	Broadway.com Audience Awards	Favorite Replacement – Female	Wicked	Nominated	
2009	Broadway.com Audience Awards	Favorite Diva Performance	9 to 5	Nominated	
2009	Broadway.com Audience Awards	Favorite Actress in a Leading Role in a Musical	9 to 5	Nominated	
2009	Drama Desk Award	Outstanding Actress in a Leading Role in a Musical	9 to 5	Nominated	
2011	Kevin Kline Award	Outstanding Actress in a Leading Role in a Musical	Cats	Nominated	
2011	Ovation Award	Best Actress	They're Playing Our Song	Nominated	
2012	Broadway.com Audience Awards	Favorite Replacement	Anything Goes	Nominated	
2012	Drama Desk Award	Outstanding Actress in a Featured Role in a Play	By the Way, Meet Vera Stark	Nominated	
2013	Tony Award	Best Actress in a Leading Role in a Musical	The Mystery of Edwin Drood	Nominated	
2013	Drama Desk Award	Outstanding Actress in a Leading Role in a Musical	The Mystery of Edwin Drood	Nominated	
2013	Broadway.com Audience Awards	Favorite Diva Performance	The Mystery of Edwin Drood	Won	
2013	Broadway.com Audience Awards	Favorite Actress in a Leading Role in a Musical	The Mystery of Edwin Drood	Nominated	
2014	Drama Desk Award	Outstanding Actress in a Featured Role in a Musical	Little Miss Sunshine	Nominated	
2017	Tony Award	Best Actress in a Featured Role in a Musical	Falsettos	Nominated	
2017	Drama Desk Award	Outstanding Featured Actress in a Musical	Falsettos	Nominated	
2017	Outer Critics Circle Award	Outstanding Actress in a Featured Role in a Musical	Falsettos	Nominated	
2017	Broadway.com Audience Awards	Favorite Diva Performance	Falsettos	Nominated	
2017	Broadway.com Audience Awards	Favorite Funny Performance	Falsettos	Nominated	
2017	Broadway.com Audience Awards	Favorite Actress in a Featured Role in a Musical	Falsettos	Nominated	
2019	Tony Award	Best Actress in a Leading Role in a Musical	The Cher Show	Won	
2019	Drama Desk Award	Outstanding Actress in a Leading Role in a Musical	The Cher Show	Won	
2019	Drama League Award	Distinguished Performance	The Cher Show	Nominated	
2019	Outer Critics Circle Award	Outstanding Actress in a Leading Role in a Musical	The Cher Show	Won	
2019	Broadway.com Audience Awards	Favorite Diva Performance	The Cher Show	Nominated	
2019	Broadway.com Audience Awards	Favorite Actress in a Leading Role in a Musical	The Cher Show	Nominated	
2023	Broadway.com Audience Awards	Favorite Replacement (Female)	Into the Woods	Nominated	
2024	Helen Hayes Award	Outstanding Performer in a Visiting Production	Into the Woods	Nominated	
2024	Helen Hayes Award	Outstanding Lead Performer in a Musical	Sunset Boulevard	Won	
