= Roses in Rhythm =

Studio album by Frankie Carle
- Released: 1948
- Label: Columbia

Professional ratings
Review scores
Source	Rating
Billboard	81/100

Frankie Carle Presents Roses in Rhythm, or simply Roses in Rhythm, is a studio album by American pianist Frankie Carle, released in 1948 on Columbia Records.

It was the third in the series of piano albums released by Carle on Columbia.

== Content ==
The album collected compositions whose titles contained the word "rose".

== Release ==
The album was originally released as a set of four 10-inch 78-rpm phonograph records (cat. no. C-174). Later, it was made available on 45 rpm (four 7-inch records, cat. no. B-174) and 33 rpm (one 10-inch LP, cat. no. CL 6032).

There was also a different Frankie Carle album titled Roses in Rhythm, released on a 12-inch LP in 1956 (cat. no. CL-913).

== Reception ==
Billboard reviewed the album in its issue from November 27, 1948, giving it 81 points out of 100 (which indicated an "excellent" rating). The reviewer stated: "Frankie Carle piano albums [...] have proven to be money-in-the-bank items. This one shouldn't become the exception to the rule. It's the same winning combination – Carle's distinctive piano tinkling with the aid of a rhythm section and eight, time-tested evergreen tunes."

The album reached number one on Billboard's Best-Selling Popular Record Albums chart for the week of January 29, 1949.

== Track listing ==
Set of four 10-inch 78-rpm records (Columbia C-174)

Side 1
No.	Title	Writer(s)	Length
1.	"Roses of Picardy"	Weatherly—Wood

Side 2
No.	Title	Writer(s)	Length
1.	"My Wild Irish Rose"	Olcott

Side 3
No.	Title	Writer(s)	Length
1.	"Mexicali Rose"	Stone—Tenney

Side 4
No.	Title	Writer(s)	Length
1.	"Rose of Washington Square"	Macdonald—Hanley

Side 5
No.	Title	Writer(s)	Length
1.	"Honeysuckle Rose"	Razaf—Waller

Side 6
No.	Title	Writer(s)	Length
1.	"Rose Room" ("In Sunny Roseland")	Williams—Hickman

Side 7
No.	Title	Writer(s)	Length
1.	"Only a Rose"	Hooker—Friml

Side 8
No.	Title	Writer(s)	Length
1.	"One Dozen Roses"	Lewis—Washburn—Jurgens—Donovan

10-inch LP (Columbia CL 6032)

Side 1
No.	Title	Length
1.	"Roses of Picardy"
2.	"Mexicali Rose"
3.	"Honeysuckle Rose"
4.	"Only a Rose"

Side 2
No.	Title	Length
1.	"My Wild Irish Rose"
2.	"Rose of Washington Square"
3.	"Rose Room" ("In Sunny Roseland")
4.	"One Dozen Roses"

== Charts ==
Chart (1949)	Peak position
US Billboard Best-Selling Popular Record Albums	1

== See also ==
- List of Billboard number-one albums of 1949
