= Kiss Me, Kate =

Musical by Cole Porter and Bella and Samuel Spewack

- Music: Cole Porter
- Lyrics: Cole Porter
- Book: Bella and Samuel Spewack
- Basis: The Taming of the Shrew by William Shakespeare
- Productions: 1948 Broadway; 1951 West End; 1999 Broadway revival 2001 West End revival 2019 Broadway revival
- Awards: 1949 Tony Award for Best Musical; 1949 Tony Award for Composer and Lyricist; 1949 Tony Award for Best Author; 1999 Tony Award for Best Revival

Kiss Me, Kate is a musical with music and lyrics by Cole Porter and a book by Bella and Samuel Spewack. The story involves the production of a musical version of William Shakespeare's The Taming of the Shrew and the conflict on and off-stage between Fred Graham, the show's director, producer, and star, and his leading lady, his ex-wife Lilli Vanessi. A secondary romance concerns Lois Lane, the actress playing Bianca, and her gambler boyfriend, Bill, who runs afoul of some gangsters. The original production starred Alfred Drake, Patricia Morison, Lisa Kirk and Harold Lang.

Kiss Me, Kate was Porter's response to Rodgers and Hammerstein's Oklahoma! and other integrated musicals; it was the first show he wrote in which the music and lyrics were firmly connected to the script. The musical premiered in 1948 and proved to be Porter's only show to run for more than 1,000 performances on Broadway. In 1949, it won the first Tony Award for Best Musical.

== Conception ==
Producer Arnold Saint-Subber conceived the idea for Kiss Me, Kate after witnessing the on-stage/off-stage battling of husband-and-wife actors Alfred Lunt and Lynn Fontanne during their 1935 production of The Taming of the Shrew. In 1947, he asked the Spewacks (undergoing their own marital woes at the time) to write the script; Bella Spewack in turn enlisted Cole Porter to write the music and lyrics.

Porter's score drew from musical styles of the Italian Renaissance, Verdi's operas, blues, the Viennese waltz, and, in "Brush Up Your Shakespeare", the 1897 hybrid "Bowery waltz". In writing the lyrics for Kiss Me, Kate, Porter drew from Shakespearean themes and language, without creating something esoteric, and the song "Always True to You in My Fashion" was inspired by the Ernest Dowson poem "Non Sum Qualis Eram Bonae Sub Regno Cynarae”, with its refrain "I have been faithful to thee, Cynara, in my fashion".

== Productions ==
=== Original Broadway production ===
After a 3½-week pre-Broadway tryout at the Shubert Theatre in Philadelphia starting December 2, 1948, the original Broadway production opened on December 30, 1948, at the New Century Theatre, where it ran for nineteen months before transferring to the Shubert, for a total run of 1,077 performances. Directed by John C. Wilson with choreography by Hanya Holm, the original cast included Alfred Drake, Patricia Morison, Lisa Kirk, Harold Lang, Charles Wood and Harry Clark. Brooks Atkinson of The New York Times praised the "authentic book which is funny without the interpolation of gags. Cole Porter has written his best score in years, together with witty lyrics. Under Hanya Holm's direction, the dancing is joyous. And Lemuel Ayers has provided carnival costumes and some interesting scenery." The production won 5 Tony awards including Best Musical. The 1949 original cast recording has been inducted into the Library of Congress's National Recording Registry for the album's "cultural, artistic and/or historical significance to American society and the nation's audio legacy".

=== Original London and Australian productions ===
The original West End production opened on March 8, 1951, at the Coliseum Theatre, and ran for 400 performances. Directed by Sam Spewack with choreography again by Holm, this production starred Patricia Morison, Bill Johnson, Adelaide Hall and Julie Wilson.

The original Australian production played from February 1952 at His Majesty's Theatre, Melbourne, before seasons in Sydney, Brisbane, Perth and Adelaide until 1954. The production featured Hayes Gordon and Joy Turpin (later replaced by Evie Hayes).

=== 1970 London and 1987 UK revivals ===
A London revival opened in December 1970 at the London Coliseum, in a production by the Sadler's Wells Opera. The cast featured Emile Belcourt (Petruchio), Judith Bruce, Eric Shilling, Ann Howard (Kate), Francis Egerton and Robert Lloyd, with direction by Peter Coe and choreography by Sheila O'Neill. Coe did a translation for British audiences, including having "a tea wagon", and included "traditional English music hall jokes". This revival had a "brief run", according to the Encyclopedia of the Musical Theatre.

The Royal Shakespeare Company staged a production which opened at the Royal Shakespeare Theatre, Stratford-upon-Avon, on February 10, 1987, toured the UK from March to May, and then played at London's Old Vic Theatre from May 19, 1987. Directed by Adrian Noble and staged by Ron Field, the production starred Nichola McAuliffe and Paul Jones as Lilli/Kate and Fred/Petruchio, with Tim Flavin and Fiona Hendley as Bill/Lucentio and Lois/Bianca. The gangsters were played by Emil Wolk and John Bardon, who shared the 1987 Olivier Award for Outstanding Performance of the Year by an Actor in a Musical, while McAuliffe won the Olivier for Outstanding Performance of the Year by an Actress in a Musical. The production moved to the Savoy Theatre on January 15, 1988, with a new cast.

=== 1952 and 1999 Broadway revivals ===
A short-lived Broadway revival ran at the Broadway Theatre in January 1952. It was directed by John C. Wilson and choreographed by Hanya Holm. Holly Harris and Robert Wright starred as Lilli and Fred.

A Broadway revival opened at the Martin Beck Theatre on November 18, 1999, and closed on December 30, 2001, after 881 performances and 28 previews. Directed by Michael Blakemore, Produced by Richard Godwin, and choreographed by Kathleen Marshall and Rob Ashford, the opening night cast included Marin Mazzie, Brian Stokes Mitchell, Amy Spanger, Michael Berresse, Ron Holgate, Lee Wilkof and Michael Mulheren. This production won the Tony Awards for Best Revival of a Musical and Best Actor in a Musical for Mitchell; Marin Mazzie received a Tony nomination for Best Actress in a Musical, and Michael Berresse, Lee Wilkof and Michael Mulheren received Tony nominations for Best Featured Actor in a Musical.

=== 2001 and 2012 London revivals ===
A West End revival opened at the Victoria Palace Theatre on October 30, 2001, and closed on August 24, 2002. As with the 1999 Broadway revival, Michael Blakemore was the director with choreography by Kathleen Marshall. Brent Barrett and Marin Mazzie co-starred.

Chichester Festival Theatre's 2012 revival of the show transferred to the Old Vic Theatre on London's South Bank in November 2012, with an official opening in December. It starred Hannah Waddingham as Lili/Kate and Alex Bourne as Fred Graham. The production was directed by Trevor Nunn. The show received positive reviews from critics and audiences. Hannah Waddingham and Alex Bourne were both nominated for the 2013 Olivier Awards as Best Actress/Actor in a Musical for their performances.

=== 2015 Opera North production ===
In September 2015 Opera North presented a revival directed by Jo Davies, choreographed by Will Tuckett. The production opened at the Leeds Grand Theatre before touring to Theatre Royal Newcastle, The Lowry Salford, and Theatre Royal Nottingham. The production was co-produced with Welsh National Opera who continued to tour it in 2016, first as part of the Shakespeare400 season at the Wales Millennium Centre, Cardiff, and then to Liverpool Empire Theatre, Bristol Hippodrome, New Theatre Oxford, Mayflower Theatre Southampton, Birmingham Hippodrome, and Venue Cymru Llandudno, before returning to Cardiff. The production was revived at London Coliseum briefly in June 2018, following a return visit to Leeds Grand Theatre in May 2018.

=== 2019 Broadway revival ===
The Roundabout Theatre Company presented a revised third Broadway revival of Kiss Me, Kate with Kelli O'Hara as Lilli Vanessi/Kate, Will Chase as Fred Graham/Petruchio, Stephanie Styles as Lois Lane/Bianca, and Corbin Bleu as Bill Calhoun/Lucentio. The production is directed by Scott Ellis and choreographed by Warren Carlyle, with minor "feminist" updates by Amanda Green to make the musical "more accessible for today's audiences". Roundabout produced a benefit concert of the show with O'Hara, Ellis, and Carlyle in 2016. The revival had a limited run at Studio 54. Previews began on February 14, 2019, with the opening on March 14. The production closed on June 30, 2019.

=== 2024 London revival ===
A revival directed by Bartlett Sher and choreographed by Anthony Van Laast ran at the Barbican Theatre in London from June 4 to September 14, 2024, with an official opening on June 18. The production starred Adrian Dunbar as Fred / Petruchio and Stephanie J. Block as Lilli / Katharine. Other cast members included Charlie Stemp as Bill / Lucentio, Georgina Onuorah as Lois / Bianca, and Nigel Lindsay and Hammed Animashaun as the gangsters. The production was filmed on stage for a November 17, 2024 release in UK cinemas and internationally.

== Casts ==
Character	Original Broadway cast (1948)	Original West End cast (1951)	1999 Broadway revival	2019 Broadway revival
Fred Graham/Petruchio	Alfred Drake	Bill Johnson	Brian Stokes Mitchell	Will Chase
Lilli Vanessi/Katharine	Patricia Morison	Patricia Morison	Marin Mazzie	Kelli O'Hara
Bill Calhoun/Lucentio	Harold Lang	Walter Long	Michael Berresse	Corbin Bleu
Lois Lane/Bianca	Lisa Kirk	Julie Wilson	Amy Spanger	Stephanie Styles
First Man	Harry Clark	Danny Green	Lee Wilkof	John Pankow
Second Man	Jack Diamond	Sidney James	Michael Mulheren	Lance Coadie Williams
Harrison Howell	Denis Green	Austin Trevor	Ron Holgate	Terence Archie
Henry Trevor/Baptista	Thomas Holer	Daniel Wherry	John Horton	Mel Johnson, Jr.
Hattie	Annabelle Hill	Adelaide Hall	Adriane Lenox	Adrienne Walker
Paul	Lorenzo Fuller	Archie Savage	Stanley Wayne Mathis	James T. Lane

== Plot ==
Act I

The cast of a musical version of William Shakespeare's The Taming of the Shrew is rehearsing for the opening of the show that evening ("Another Op'nin', Another Show"). Egotistical Fred Graham is the director and producer and is starring as Petruchio; his movie-star ex-wife, Lilli Vanessi, is playing Katharine. The two seem to be constantly arguing, and Lilli is particularly angry that Fred is pursuing the alluring young actress Lois Lane, who is playing Bianca. After the rehearsal, Lois's boyfriend Bill appears; he is playing Lucentio, but he missed the rehearsal because he was gambling. He tells her that he signed a $10,000 IOU in Fred's name, and Lois reprimands him ("Why Can't You Behave?").

Before the opening, Fred and Lilli meet backstage, and Lilli shows off her engagement ring from Washington insider General Harrison Howell, reminding Fred that it is the anniversary of their divorce. They recall the operetta in which they met, which included "Wunderbar", a Viennese waltz; they end up fondly reminiscing, singing and dancing. Two gangsters show up to collect the $10,000 IOU, and Fred replies that he never signed it; the gangsters obligingly say they will give him time to remember it and will return later. In her dressing room, Lilli receives flowers from Fred, and she declares that she is still "So In Love" with him. Fred tries to keep Lilli from reading the card that came with the flowers, which reveals that he really intended them for Lois. However, Lilli takes the card with her onstage, saying she will read it later.

The show begins ("We Open in Venice"). Baptista, Katharine and Bianca's father, will not allow his younger daughter Bianca to marry until his older daughter Katharine is married. However, she is shrewish and ill-tempered, and no man desires to marry her. Three suitors – Lucentio, Hortensio, and Gremio – try to woo Bianca, and she says that she would marry any of them ("Tom, Dick, or Harry"). Petruchio, a friend of Lucentio, expresses a desire to marry into wealth ("I've Come to Wive it Wealthily in Padua"). The suitors hatch a plan for him to marry Kate, as Baptista is rich. Kate, however, has no intentions of getting married ("I Hate Men"); Petruchio attempts to woo her ("Were Thine That Special Face"). Offstage, Lilli has an opportunity to read the card. She walks on stage off-cue and begins beating Fred, who, along with the other actors, tries to remain in character as Baptista gives Petruchio permission to marry Kate. Lilli continues to strike Fred, and he ends up spanking her onstage.

Offstage, Lilli furiously declares she is leaving the show. However, the gangsters reappear, and Fred tells them that if Lilli quits, he'll have to close the show and won't be able to pay them the $10,000; the gangsters force her to stay at gunpoint. Back onstage, Bianca and Lucentio dance while the chorus performs "We Sing of Love", covering a scene change. The curtain opens, revealing the exterior of a church; Petruchio and Kate have just been married, and they exit the church; the gangsters, dressed in Shakespearean costume, are onstage to make sure that Lilli stays. Petruchio implores for Kate to kiss him, and she refuses. He lifts her over his shoulder and carries her offstage while she pummels his shoulder with her fists ("Kiss Me Kate").

Act II

During the show's intermission, the cast and crew relax in the alley behind the theater, lamenting that it's "Too Darn Hot" to meet their lovers that night. The play continues, as Petruchio tries to "tame" Katharine and mourns for his now-lost bachelor life ("Where Is the Life That Late I Led?"). Offstage, Lilli's fiancé Harrison Howell is looking for her. He runs into Lois, and she recognizes him as a former lover but promises not to tell Lilli. Bill is shocked to overhear this, but Lois tells him that even if she is involved with other men, she is faithful to him in her own way ("Always True to You in My Fashion"). Lilli tries to explain to Howell that she is being forced to stay at the theatre by the gangsters, but Howell doesn't believe her and wants to discuss wedding plans. Fred insidiously points out how boring Lilli's life with Howell will be compared with the theatre. Bill sings a love song he has written for Lois ("Bianca").

The gangsters discover that their boss has been killed, so the IOU is no longer valid. Lilli leaves—without Howell—as Fred unsuccessfully tries to persuade her to stay ("So in Love" (Reprise)). The gangsters get caught on stage and improvise a comedic tribute to Shakespeare in which they explain that knowing Shakespeare is the key to romance ("Brush Up Your Shakespeare"). The company prepares for the conclusion of the play, the wedding of Bianca and Lucentio, even though they are now missing one of the main characters. However, just in time for Katharine's final speech, Lilli arrives onstage ("I Am Ashamed That Women Are So Simple"). Fred and Lilli wordlessly reconcile on stage, and the play ends ("Kiss Me Kate" (Finale)) with them, as well as Bill and Lois, kissing passionately.

== Song list ==
Act I

- "Another Op'nin', Another Show" – Hattie and Company
- "Why Can't You Behave?" – Lois Lane and Bill Calhoun
- "Wunderbar" – Fred Graham and Lilli Vanessi
- "So in Love" – Lilli
- "We Open in Venice" – Petruchio (Fred), Katharine Minola (Lilli), Bianca (Lois) and Lucentio (Bill)
- "Tom, Dick or Harry" – Bianca, Lucentio, Gremio and Hortensio
- "I've Come to Wive it Wealthily in Padua" – Petruchio and the Men
- "I Hate Men" – Katharine
- "Were Thine That Special Face"^ – Petruchio
- "We Sing of Love (Cantiamo D'Amore)" – Bianca, Lucentio and Ensemble
- "Kiss Me, Kate" – Petruchio, Katharine and Ensemble

Act II

- "Too Darn Hot" – Paul and Ensemble
- "Where is the Life That Late I Led?" – Petruchio
- "Always True to You in My Fashion" – Lois
- "From This Moment On"^ – Harrison Howell and Lilli
- "Bianca" – Bill and Ensemble
- "So in Love" (Reprise) – Fred
- "Brush Up Your Shakespeare" – First Gangster and Second Gangster
- "I Am Ashamed That Women Are So Simple" – Katharine
- "Kiss Me, Kate" (Reprise/Finale) – Company

Notes

- In 1998, the original cast recording of the 1948 Broadway production was inducted into the Grammy Hall of Fame.
- The song From This Moment On, originally from Porter's 1951 musical Out of This World, was added to the 1953 film version of Kiss Me Kate. This song was also added to Act II, between Always True to You in My Fashion and Bianca, in the 1999 revival.
- For the 2019 revival, "I Am Ashamed That Women Are So Simple" was changed to "I Am Ashamed That People Are So Simple."
- ^ songs were cut from the 2024 London revival.

== Film and television ==
A film version of the same name was released in 1953. There have been at least five television productions, the first on Hallmark Hall of Fame in 1958, with Drake and Morison reprising their Broadway roles, the second recorded for the launch of BBC Two in the UK in 1964, starring Howard Keel, Patricia Morison, Millicent Martin and Bill Owen; the third in 1968 with then husband-and-wife team Robert Goulet and Carol Lawrence, and the fourth in 2003 on Great Performances, a high-definition shot performance of the London revival with Brent Barrett and Rachel York. The fifth, a live filming of the 2024 London revival, which played in select movie theaters on November 17, 2024, aired as part of Great Performances on May 30, 2025.

== Awards and nominations ==
=== Original Broadway production ===
Year	Award	Category	Nominee	Result
1949	Tony Award	Best Musical		Won
1949	Tony Award	Best Author (Musical)	Samuel and Bella Spewack	Won
1949	Tony Award	Best Original Score	Cole Porter	Won
1949	Tony Award	Best Costume Design	Lemuel Ayers	Won
1949	Tony Award	Best Producer of a Musical	Saint Subber and Lemuel Ayers	Won

=== 1987 Royal Shakespeare Company UK revival ===
Year	Award	Category	Nominee	Result
1987	Laurence Olivier Award	Best Musical Revival		Nominated
1987	Laurence Olivier Award	Outstanding Performance of the Year by an Actor in a Musical	John Bardon and Emil Wolk	Won
1987	Laurence Olivier Award	Outstanding Performance of the Year by an Actress in a Musical	Nichola McAuliffe	Won

=== 1999 Broadway revival ===
Year	Award	Category	Nominee	Result
2000	Tony Award	Best Revival of a Musical		Won
2000	Tony Award	Best Performance by a Leading Actor in a Musical	Brian Stokes Mitchell	Won
2000	Tony Award	Best Performance by a Leading Actress in a Musical	Marin Mazzie	Nominated
2000	Tony Award	Best Performance by a Featured Actor in a Musical	Michael Berresse	Nominated
2000	Tony Award	Best Performance by a Featured Actor in a Musical	Lee Wilkof	Nominated
2000	Tony Award	Best Performance by a Featured Actor in a Musical	Michael Mulheren	Nominated
2000	Tony Award	Best Direction of a Musical	Michael Blakemore	Won
2000	Tony Award	Best Choreography	Kathleen Marshall	Nominated
2000	Tony Award	Best Orchestrations	Don Sebesky	Won
2000	Tony Award	Best Scenic Design	Robin Wagner	Nominated
2000	Tony Award	Best Costume Design	Martin Pakledinaz	Won
2000	Tony Award	Best Lighting Design	Peter Kaczorowski	Nominated
2000	Drama Desk Award	Outstanding Revival of a Musical		Won
2000	Drama Desk Award	Outstanding Actor in a Musical	Brian Stokes Mitchell	Won
2000	Drama Desk Award	Outstanding Actress in a Musical	Marin Mazzie	Nominated
2000	Drama Desk Award	Outstanding Featured Actor in a Musical	Michael Mulheren	Nominated
2000	Drama Desk Award	Outstanding Featured Actor in a Musical	Lee Wilkof	Nominated
2000	Drama Desk Award	Outstanding Director of a Musical	Michael Blakemore	Won
2000	Drama Desk Award	Outstanding Choreography	Hanya Holm	Nominated
2000	Drama Desk Award	Outstanding Orchestrations	Don Sebesky	Won
2000	Drama Desk Award	Outstanding Set Design	Robin Wagner	Won
2000	Drama Desk Award	Outstanding Costume Design	Martin Pakledinaz	Won

=== 2001 London revival ===
Year	Award	Category	Nominee	Result
2002	Laurence Olivier Award	Best Musical Revival		Nominated
2002	Laurence Olivier Award	Best Actor in a Musical	Brent Barrett	Nominated
2002	Laurence Olivier Award	Best Actress in a Musical	Marin Mazzie	Nominated
2002	Laurence Olivier Award	Best Performance in a Supporting Role in a Musical	Nancy Anderson	Nominated
2002	Laurence Olivier Award	Best Performance in a Supporting Role in a Musical	Michael Berresse	Nominated
2002	Laurence Olivier Award	Best Director of a Musical	Michael Blakemore	Nominated
2002	Laurence Olivier Award	Best Theatre Choreographer	Kathleen Marshall	Nominated
2002	Laurence Olivier Award	Best Set Design	Robin Wagner	Nominated
2002	Laurence Olivier Award	Best Costume Design	Martin Pakledinaz	Nominated
2002	Evening Standard Award	Best Musical		Won
2002	Critics Circle Award	Best Musical		Won

=== 2012 London revival ===
Year	Award	Category	Nominee	Result
2013	Laurence Olivier Award	Best Musical Revival		Nominated
2013	Laurence Olivier Award	Best Actor in a Musical	Alex Bourne	Nominated
2013	Laurence Olivier Award	Best Actress in a Musical	Hannah Waddingham	Nominated
2013	Laurence Olivier Award	Best Performance in a Supporting Role in a Musical	Adam Garcia	Nominated
2013	Laurence Olivier Award	Best Theatre Choreographer	Stephen Mear	Nominated

=== 2019 Broadway revival ===
Year	Award	Category	Nominee	Result
2019	Tony Award	Best Revival of a Musical		Nominated
2019	Tony Award	Best Actress in a Musical	Kelli O'Hara	Nominated
2019	Tony Award	Best Choreography	Warren Carlyle	Nominated
2019	Tony Award	Best Orchestrations	Larry Hochman	Nominated
2019	Drama Desk Award	Outstanding Revival of a Musical		Nominated
2019	Drama Desk Award	Outstanding Featured Actor in a Musical	Corbin Bleu	Nominated
2019	Drama Desk Award	Outstanding Choreography	Warren Carlyle	Won
2019	Drama League Awards	Outstanding Revival of a Broadway or Off-Broadway Musical		Won
2019	Drama League Awards	Distinguished Performance Award	Kelli O’Hara	Nominated
2019	Outer Critics Circle Awards	Outstanding Revival of a Musical (Broadway or Off-Broadway)		Nominated
2019	Outer Critics Circle Awards	Outstanding Choreographer	Warren Carlyle	Won
2019	Outer Critics Circle Awards	Outstanding Actress in a Musical	Kelli O'Hara	Nominated

=== 2024 London revival ===
Year	Award	Category	Nominee	Result
2024	WhatsOnStage Awards	Best Musical Revival		Nominated
2024	WhatsOnStage Awards	Best Choreography	Anthony Van Laast	Nominated
