= Kiss Me Kate (film) =

1953 film by George Sidney

- Theatrical release poster
- Directed by: George Sidney
- Screenplay by: Dorothy Kingsley
- Based on: Kiss Me, Kate; 1948 musical by Bella and Samuel Spewack
- Produced by: Jack Cummings
- Starring: Kathryn Grayson; Howard Keel; Ann Miller; James Whitmore; Kurt Kasznar; Keenan Wynn; Bobby Van
- Cinematography: Charles Rosher
- Edited by: Ralph E. Winters
- Music by: Cole Porter (songs); Saul Chaplin (score); André Previn Conrad Salinger (orchestrations)
- Production company: Metro-Goldwyn-Mayer
- Distributed by: Loew's Inc.
- Release dates: October 15, 1953 (previews); November 5, 1953 (New York City); November 26, 1953 (United States)
- Running time: 109 minutes
- Country: United States
- Languages: English; French; Italian
- Budget: $1,981,000
- Box office: $3,117,000 (rentals)

Kiss Me Kate is a 1953 American musical romantic comedy film directed by George Sidney from a screenplay by Dorothy Kingsley, based on the 1948 Broadway musical Kiss Me, Kate by Bella and Samuel Spewack. The film stars Kathryn Grayson, Howard Keel, Ann Miller, James Whitmore, and Kurt Kasznar, with Keenan Wynn and Bobby Van.

Inspired by William Shakespeare's play The Taming of the Shrew, it tells the tale of formerly married musical theater actors Fred Graham and Lilli Vanessi, brought together to star opposite one another in the roles of Petruchio and Katherine in a Broadway musical version of Shakespeare's play.

Already on poor terms, the two leads skirmish from the start. Their relationship eventually breaks into an all-out emotional war mid-performance that threatens the production's success. The only thing keeping the show together are threats from a pair of gangsters who have come to collect a gambling debt.

Kingsley's screenplay was nominated for a Writers Guild of America Award. The songs were by Cole Porter, with musical underscoring by Saul Chaplin and André Previn, who were nominated for an Oscar. Hermes Pan choreographed most of the dance routines.

The film was shot in 3-D, using the most advanced technology then available. Devotees of the stereoscopic 3-D medium usually cite this film as one of the best examples of a Hollywood release in polarized 3D.

== Plot ==
Fred Graham and Lilli Vanessi, a divorced couple, meet at Fred's New York apartment to hear Cole Porter perform the score for Kiss Me Kate, his musical version of The Taming of the Shrew, to be directed by Fred. Cole Porter plays the song "So In Love" to both Fred and Lilli, who love the song, despite the fact that Lilli distances herself from Fred. Lois Lane arrives to audition for the Bianca role ("Too Darn Hot"). Lilli declines the lead role of "Katherine", opposite Fred as the male lead Petruchio, since she is leaving to marry a rich Texas rancher. She changes her mind when Cole and Fred manipulate her by offering Lois the lead role instead.

Lois' boyfriend, Bill Calhoun, is playing Lucentio in the show. He leads a gambling lifestyle, which results in him owing a local gangster $2,000, but he signs the IOU in Fred's name. Lois laments his bad-boy lifestyle ("Why Can't You Behave?").

After a fiery confrontation during rehearsals, Fred and Lilli get together in her dressing room and reminisce about happier times ("Wunderbar"). Fred later sends flowers and a card to Lois, but his butler mistakenly gives them to Lilli. Lilli is overcome by this romantic gesture and fails to read the card ("So In Love (Reprise)").

The play opens, with Fred, Lilli, Lois and Bill performing an opening number ("We Open in Venice"). In the play, Bianca, the younger daughter of Baptista, wishes to marry, but her father will not allow it until his elder daughter, Katherine, is married. Bianca has three suitors – Gremio, Hortensio and Lucentio – and each of them try to win her over. She is prepared to marry anyone ("...any Tom, Dick or Harry...").

Petruchio arrives, seeking a wife ("I've Come to Wive It Wealthily in Padua"), and when he hears of Katherine, he resolves to woo her. Katherine hates the idea of getting married ("I Hate Men"). When Petruchio serenades Katherine ("Were Thine That Special Face"), Lilli finally reads the card from the flowers. She sees that it is addressed to Lois, and attacks Fred/Petruchio on stage, ad-libbing verbal abuse. As the curtain comes down, Fred spanks Lilli/Kate. Backstage, Lilli phones her fiancé, Tex, to come and immediately pick her up.

Lippy and Slug, a pair of thugs, arrive to collect from Fred. Fred asks them to keep Lilli from leaving the show so it will be successful enough for Fred to pay the debt. Lois has learned that Fred has taken responsibility for the IOU and she comes to thank him, but each time she begins to thank him for not being angry about Bill forging his name, Fred kisses her to prevent Lippy and Slug from learning about his deception. Lilli and Bill walk in on the scene and become furious.

In order to keep Lilli from leaving, Slug and Lippy appear on stage, disguised as Petruchio's servants. They have no acting ability, but still manage to amuse the audience. Petruchio sets about "taming the shrew", but later reminisces about his days of philandering ("Where Is the Life That Late I Led?").

During the play's intermission, when Tex arrives to rescue Lilli from the theatre, he is recognized by Lois, an old flame. When Bill is angered by Lois' behavior, she admits that though she loves Bill, she cannot resist the advances of other men ("Always True to You in My Fashion").

The gambling debt is cancelled by the untimely death of Slug and Lippy's boss, so they stop interfering with Lilli's mid-performance departure from the theatre. Fred tells her that she truly belongs in theatre, and also reveals his true feelings for her. She departs, leaving a dejected Fred to be cheered up by Slug and Lippy ("Brush Up Your Shakespeare").

Bianca marries Lucentio. The rejected suitors, Gremio and Hortensio, meet two new girls ("From This Moment On"). At the finale, the show is temporarily halted when Lilli's understudy goes missing. Suddenly, Lilli reappears on stage, delivering Kate's speech about how women should surrender to their husbands ("I'm Ashamed That Women Are So Simple"). Fred is bowled over, and the play reaches its triumphant finale ("Kiss Me Kate"), with Fred and Lilli back together as a real couple.

== Cast ==
- Kathryn Grayson as Lilli Vanessi / "Katherine (Kate)"
- Howard Keel as Fred Graham / "Petruchio"
- Ann Miller as Lois Lane / "Bianca"
- Keenan Wynn as Lippy
- Tommy Rall as Bill Calhoun / "Lucentio"
- James Whitmore as Slug
- Kurt Kasznar as "Baptista"
- Bobby Van as "Gremio"
- Bob Fosse as "Hortensio"
- Ron Randell as Cole Porter
- Willard Parker as Tex Calloway
- Ann Codee as Suzanne, Lili's maid
- Claud Allister as Paul, Fred's valet
- Dave O'Brien as Ralph, the stage manager
- Carol Haney and Jeanne Coyne as specialty dancers in "From This Moment On"

Cast notes:

- Lilli's understudy, Jeanie, is mentioned several times, but never appears.
- In the 1948 stage musical, Lilli's fiancé is the aging Senator Harrison Howell. This character was cut from the film and replaced by Tex Calloway.

== Production ==
Metro-Goldwyn-Mayer adapted Kiss Me, Kate from the 1948 Broadway musical, with Dorothy Kingsley writing the screenplay for director George Sidney and producer Jack Cummings. According to the AFI Catalog of Feature Films, the film was in production from early May to July 4, 1953.

Most of the film's songs came from the stage musical, but "From This Moment On" was taken from Cole Porter's 1950 musical Out of This World. The Production Code Administration required changes to some of the stage version's more suggestive lyrics, including replacing a reference to the Kinsey Report in "Too Darn Hot" with "the latest report". Bob Fosse, who appeared as Hortensio, was allowed to choreograph a short dance segment for himself and Carol Haney in "From This Moment On"; he later described the moment as a turning point in his career.

Kiss Me Kate was MGM's second venture into stereoscopic 3-D filmmaking, after Arena. Studio head Dore Schary later recalled that he was skeptical of the format, but MGM made the film in 3-D under pressure from studio executives. To protect the release if audiences rejected 3-D, MGM also prepared a standard two-dimensional version.

== Musical numbers ==
1. "So in Love" – Lilli and Fred
2. "Too Darn Hot" – Lois
3. "Why Can't You Behave?" – Lois
4. "Kiss Me, Kate" – MGM Studio and Orchestra Chorus
5. "Wunderbar" – Lilli and Fred
6. "So in Love (Reprise)" – Lilli
7. "We Open in Venice" – Lilli, Fred, Lois, Bill
8. "Tom, Dick or Harry" – Lois, Gremio, Bill, Hortensio
9. "I've Come to Wive it Wealthily in Padua" – Fred
10. "I Hate Men" – Lilli
11. "Were Thine That Special Face" – Fred
12. "Finale Act One (Kiss Me, Kate)" – Chorus
13. "Where Is the Life That Late I Led?" – Fred
14. "Always True to You in My Fashion" – Lois and Bill
15. "Brush Up Your Shakespeare" – Slug and Lippy
16. "From This Moment On" – Lois, Bill, Hortensio, Gremio
17. "Finale" – Fred and Chorus

Song notes:

- The song "Another Op'nin', Another Show" was cut and survives in the film only as an instrumental, with the chorus melody being heard several times. Cole Porter opposed it being cut, so the melody was inserted into "Why Can't You Behave?" as a dance sequence, and it is also used as incidental music in several places.
- "From this Moment On" was not in the original Broadway production but was originally from another Cole Porter Broadway show, Out of This World (1950). Bob Fosse choreographed his featured solo in this number, danced with Carol Haney. The song was subsequently added to the stage production in the 1999 revival as a backstage duet between Lilli and Harrison Howell, her love interest in the stage play.
- The song "Too Darn Hot" is sung by Lois early in the film instead of three African American males in the stage version. Also, the line about the "Kinsey Report" was too controversial, and had to be changed to the "Latest Report".

== Release ==
Kiss Me Kate was previewed on October 15, 1953, in four locations: two in 3-D with stereophonic sound (in Columbus, Ohio, and at the Victory Theatre in Evansville, Indiana) and two in 2-D (Loew's theaters in Rochester, New York, and Houston, Texas). Additional previews took place later in October in Dayton, Ohio (2-D), and at the Majestic Theatre in Dallas, Texas (3-D). Grosses from the 3-D version were 40% higher.

Despite the results, Radio City Music Hall decided not to screen it in 3-D when it opened November 5, 1953, in New York City.

Although Kiss Me Kate is often referred to as the first 3-D musical, Those Redheads from Seattle, also a 3-D musical, was released by Paramount Pictures on October 16, 1953.

== Reception ==
=== Box office ===
In its opening at Radio City Music Hall, Kiss Me Kate grossed a below-par $130,000 for the week, although this was blamed on a snowstorm at the weekend.

According to MGM records, the film earned theatrical rentals of $2,011,000 in the United States and Canada and $1,106,000 elsewhere, for a worldwide total of $3,117,000. Gross profit was $1,136,000, but high production costs led to a net loss of $544,000.

=== Critical response ===
The film had a mostly positive reception. Bosley Crowther of The New York Times called Kiss Me Kate "one of the year's more magnificent musical films ... a beautifully staged, adroitly acted and really superbly sung affair—better, indeed, if one may say so, than the same frolic was on the stage." Variety opened its positive review by stating: "Metro's reputation for turning out top calibre musical pictures is further enhanced with Kiss Me Kate. It's Shakespeare's Taming of the Shrew done over in eminently satisfying fashion via a collaboration of superior song, dance and comedy talents." Harrison's Reports called it "a lively and highly entertaining blend of comedy, music, dancing and romance."

John McCarten of The New Yorker was more dismissive, writing that it "does have some engaging tunes, but the book of the original has been so thoroughly laundered that little of the comedy, which ran to fairly bawdy stuff, remains, and Kathryn Grayson and Howard Keel, as a bickering theatrical pair compelled to play opposite each other in Shakespeare, are lacking in vital juices." Richard L. Coe of The Washington Post disliked the changes made to the stage version such as the reduction of "Another Op'nin" and "I Am Ashamed That Women Are So Simple," calling the film "a grand musical with lots of pleasures to recommend it. But if you're familiar with what they had to work with, you'll not be enthusiastic, a form of criticism with which not all agree, but in this case I don't see how it's to be avoided." The Monthly Film Bulletin wrote, "The execution generally—sets, costumes, dance numbers, the Cole Porter songs—is pleasing, but the direction lacks flair and the film seems somewhat over-long."
