= Kiss Me, Kate (2024 film) =

Film by Bartlett Sher

- Theatrical release poster
- Directed by: Bartlett Sher
- Based on: Kiss Me, Kate by Bella and Samuel Spewack
- Starring: Adrian Dunbar; Stephanie J. Block
- Music by: Cole Porter
- Distributed by: Trafalgar Releasing
- Release date: 17 November 2024
- Running time: 161 minutes
- Country: United Kingdom
- Language: English
- Box office: $737,395

Kiss Me, Kate (also known as Kiss Me, Kate: The Musical) is a 2024 British musical comedy film directed by Bartlett Sher, based on the 1948 Broadway musical of the same name. The film stars Adrian Dunbar and Stephanie J. Block were filmed at the Barbican Theatre in London. The film director is Brett Sullivan.

The film was released in cinemas across the United Kingdom and United States on 17 November 2024, and has grossed $737,395 at the box office.

== Cast ==
- Adrian Dunbar as Fred
- Stephanie J. Block as Lilli
- Jack Butterworth as Paul
- Georgina Onuorah as Lois Lane
- Charlie Stemp as Bill Calhoun
- Peter Davison as General Harrison Howell

== Production ==
Kiss Me, Kate was filmed at the Barbican Theatre in London. The production company was Steam Motion and Sound.

== Release ==
Kiss Me, Kate was released in cinemas across the United Kingdom and United States on 17 November 2024. The film was also released in cinemas across Australia and New Zealand on 29 November 2024.

== Reception ==
=== Box office ===
Kiss Me, Kate grossed $737,395 at the box office in the United Kingdom, Australia and New Zealand.

=== Critical response ===
Clive Davis of The Times rated the film four out of five stars, calling it "enormous fun".
