= Another Op'nin', Another Show =

"Another Op'nin', Another Show" is the opening number of Cole Porter's 1948 musical Kiss Me, Kate. It was introduced by Patricia Morison.

Sung by a band of players performing a musical adaption of Shakespeare's The Taming of the Shrew, the song has become regarded as a show business anthem on a level with "That's Entertainment!" (from The Band Wagon) and "There's No Business Like Show Business" (from Annie Get Your Gun). However, it was not included in the 1953 film version of the musical, except — when Porter insisted that the song be used in the film — as an instrumental dance number from the song "Why Can't You Behave"

Adelaide Hall, playing the role of Hattie, sang "Another Op'nin', Another Show" in the London production of Kiss Me, Kate, which opened on March 8, 1951 at the Coliseum Theatre and ran for 400 performances.

Marin Mazzie and Hannah Waddingham have also performed the song in the show.

== Other appearances ==
The song was the opening number of episode 514 of The Muppet Show.

Sharon, Lois & Bram performed the song on their television series Sharon, Lois & Bram's Elephant Show in 1987 on the Snow White Elephant episode featuring Jayne Eastwood. The episode celebrated the 50th Anniversary of Snow White.
