= Why Can't You Behave? =

Song
- Published: 1948 by T.B. Harms Co.
- Songwriter(s): Cole Porter

"Why Can't You Behave?" is a 1948 popular song written by Cole Porter, for his musical Kiss Me, Kate, where it was introduced by Lisa Kirk. The character Lois Lane sings it to her boyfriend Bill, who had just missed rehearsal because he was gambling and told her he signed a $10,000 IOU in the name of the director of the show. In the 1953 film version, the song is performed by Ann Miller.

== Notable recordings ==
- 1948 Frank Sinatra - recorded December 15, 1948 with The Phil Moore Four.
- 1949 Bing Crosby - recorded January 4, 1949 with Vic Schoen and His Orchestra for Decca Records.
