= So in Love =

1948 song by Cole Porter

Song
- Published: 1948
- Genre: Show tune
- Songwriter: Cole Porter

"So in Love" is a song by Cole Porter from his 1948 musical Kiss Me, Kate, which is based on Shakespeare's The Taming of the Shrew. The tune is sung by Lilli Vanessi after she receives flowers her ex-husband had intended for someone else, and as the song progresses, Lilli's initial sorrowful resignation develops into unrequited love.

It was first sung in the show by Patricia Morison, reprised by Alfred Drake, and further popularized by Patti Page in 1949. The Page recording was issued by Mercury Records as catalog number 5230, and first reached the Billboard chart on February 12, 1949, lasting two weeks and peaking at No. 13. Other versions popular that year were by Gordon MacRae and Dinah Shore. The song has been recorded by many other artists, including Peggy Lee and Ella Fitzgerald.

== Recorded versions ==
- Julie Andrews – 1989
- The Joe Ascione Quartet – Movin' Up! (2007)
- Josephine Barstow & Thomas Hampson – 1990
- Shirley Bassey – Shirley (1961)
- Mimi Benzell – 1959
- Vikki Carr – 1964
- Rondi Charleston – 2001
- Andy Cole – 1958
- Chick Corea – 1989
- Bing Crosby (with Vic Schoen's Orchestra) (recorded January 4, 1949; released by Decca Records as catalog number 24559, with the flip side “Why Can't You Behave?”)
- Plácido Domingo – 1991
- Tommy Dorsey & His Orch. (vocal: Denny Dennis) – 1948; released by RCA Victor Records as catalog number 20-3331, with the flip side “While the Angelus Was Ringing”
- Alfred Drake (released by RCA Victor Records as catalog number 20-3352, with the flip side “Were Thine That Special Face”)
- Alfred Drake & Anne Jeffreys (Broadway Revival) – 1965
- Lara Fabian & Mario Frangoulis (feat. in the film "De-Lovely") – 2004
- Eddie Fisher – 1955
- Ella Fitzgerald – Ella Fitzgerald Sings the Cole Porter Songbook (1956)
- Renée Fleming & Bryn Terfel on Fleming's album Under the Stars (2003)
- The Four Lads – 1958
- Sergio Franchi – RCA Victor album There Goes My Heart (1965)
- Sergio Franchi – 1976
- Lily Frost – 2006
- Roberta Gambarini – Groovin' High Records – 2009
- Lesley Garrett – 1996
- Robert Goulet & Carol Lawrence (TV Production) – 1968
- Gogi Grant & Howard Keel – 1959
- Kathryn Grayson & Howard Keel (Film Soundtrack) – 1953; released by MGM Records as catalog number 30813, with the flip side “I Hate Men”
- Jane Harvey (released by MGM Records as catalog number 10359, with the flip side “Always True to You in My Fashion”)
- Dick Haymes – 1948
- Edmund Hockridge & Janine Roebuck – 1996
- Mark Jacoby
- Jazz Orchestra of the Delta – Big Band Reflections of Cole Porter (2003)
- Betty Johnson
- Allan Jones with orchestra conducted by Robert Armbruster. Recorded in Hollywood on April 26, 1950. It was released by EMI on the His Master's Voice label as catalog number BD 6085.
- Stan Kenton
- Dave King – I'll Be Ringing You (2012)
- Lisa Kirk – 1953
- k.d. lang – Red Hot + Blue (1990)
- Mario Lanza
- Steve Lawrence
- Peggy Lee – 1958
- Liane & The Boheme Bar Trio – 1959
- Guy Lombardo's Orchestra (recorded January 24, 1949; released by Decca Records as catalog number 24572, with the flip side “Here I'll Stay”)
- Julie London – 1965
- Joe Loss and His Orchestra. Recorded in London on January 29, 1950. It was released by EMI on their His Master's Voice label as catalog number BD 6088
- Lulu – 1965
- Patti LuPone – 2005
- Gordon MacRae – 1949; released by Capitol Records as catalog number 1684, with the flip side “Ramona”
- Sue Matthews – 1993
- Marin Mazzie & Brian Stokes Mitchell (Broadway Revival) – 1999
- Nichola McAuliffe & Paul Jones (London Revival) – 1987
- Robert Merrill & Roberta Peters
- Vaughn Monroe (released by RCA Victor Records as catalog number 20-4171, with the flip side “I Concentrate on You”)
- Diana Montague & Thomas Allen – 1993
- Patricia Morison & Alfred Drake (Broadway Production) – 1948
- Patricia Morison & Alfred Drake (TV Production) – 1958
- Patricia Morison & Alfred Drake – 1959
- Patricia Morison & Bill Johnson (London Production) – 1951
- Joan Morris – 1988
- Mika Ohashi – 1988
- Georg Ots
- Patti Page – 1949; released by Mercury Records as catalog number 5230, with the flip side “Where's That Man?”
- Johnny Prophet – 1963
- Tito Puente – 1960
- John Raitt
- Patricia Routledge & David Holliday – 1967
- Diane Schuur – 2005
- Dinah Shore (recorded December 1948; released by Columbia Records as catalog number 38399, with the flip side “Always True to You in My Fashion”)
- Cesare Siepi – 1958 and 1964
- Frank Sinatra & Keely Smith – 1963
- Dakota Staton – 1961
- Enzo Stuarti
- Kiri Te Kanawa – 1985
- Clare Teal – Don't Talk (2004)
- Trio Désolé feat. Lorraine Caron on their album Sweet Surrender (2013)
- Leslie Uggams – So in Love! (1963)
- Jerry Vale – 1966
- Marlene VerPlanck
- Caetano Veloso – Foreign Sound (2004)
- Dinah Washington
- Deborah 'DeDe' Wedekind – Clear Skies Ahead (2011)
- Julie Wilson
- Will Wright
- Earl Wrightson – 1962
- Rachel York & Brent Barrett (London Revival) – 2002)
- Tony Bennett – Love for Sale (2021)
- Joe Hisaishi & New Japan Philharmonic World Dream Orchestra - American in Paris (2005)
