= Too Darn Hot =

1948 musical theatre song

"Too Darn Hot" is a song written by Cole Porter for his musical Kiss Me, Kate (1948).

== Background ==
In the stage version, it is sung at the start of Act 2, and in the 1948 original Broadway production, it was sung by Lorenzo Fuller (as Paul) and Eddie Sledge and Fred Davis (as the specialty dancers), leading the full company.

In the 1953 MGM Hollywood film version, it is moved to a much earlier point, and it is sung by Ann Miller (as Lois Lane, Fred's new girlfriend, who is cast as Bianca). The song does not contribute to the plot in either the stage or film versions (according to general opinion); in the stage version, the song represents the company of The Taming of the Shrew taking a break offstage during the intermission of their play; in the film version it allowed the audience to see Lois's fun-loving, risk-taking nature, and gave Ann Miller a chance to show off her dancing skills, specifically tap. The line 'According to the Kinsey report' (in the original stage production) was changed in the film version to 'According to the latest report'. The song has also been covered by many artists.

== Notable recordings ==
- Ella Fitzgerald recorded the song for her 1956 album Ella Fitzgerald Sings the Cole Porter Song Book, and on her 1960 album Ella in Berlin: Mack the Knife.

"Too Darn Hot"

Song by Ella Fitzgerald

from the album Ella Fitzgerald Sings the Cole Porter Songbook
- Released: 1956
- Recorded: February – March 1956
- Genre: Jazz
- Length: 3:51
- Label: verve
- Songwriter: Cole Porter

- Petula Clark recorded it for her album Petula Clark in Hollywood (1959).
- Mel Torme - included on Mel Tormé Swings Shubert Alley 1960)
- Erasure for the Red Hot + Blue compilation (album and video versions) in 1990.
- Stacey Kent - for her album The Boy Next Door (2003)
- Anthony Strong on his 2013 album Stepping Out
- Holly Cole for the album Shade (2013)

== In popular culture ==
- On February 16, 1964 Mitzi Gaynor performed the song on The Ed Sullivan Show, broadcast live from the Deauville Hotel in Miami Beach, in between the two sets by The Beatles for their second appearance on the show.
- This song was the soundtrack of a 2003 Adidas commercial.
- The song gained new currency in 2004 because of two films that came out that year. The first was the Porter biopic De-Lovely, and the second was the movie Kinsey, which used the tune because Porter mentioned the Kinsey report on American sexual attitudes in the song's bridge.
- This song is referenced in the title song of the 2008 musical In the Heights by Usnavi.
- In 2013, for Verve Remixed: The First Ladies, RAC (DJ) did a chill version of Ella Fitzgerald's take.
- In 2015, Katie Derham danced the Charleston to "Too Darn Hot" on the thirteenth series of Strictly Come Dancing with her professional dancing partner Anton Du Beke.
- The song is featured in the establishing opening scene of the 2024 film Apartment 7A, a prequel to the 1968 film Rosemary's Baby.
- Part of the song is played in the film Kinsey to illustrate the impact Alfred Kinsey's 1948 Sexual Behavior in the Human Male had on popular culture.
