= Out of This World (musical) =

1950 musical with music and lyrics by Cole Porter

- Original cast recording
- Music: Cole Porter
- Lyrics: Cole Porter
- Book: Dwight Taylor; Reginald Lawrence
- Basis: Plautus' play Amphitryon
- Productions: 1950 Broadway

Out of This World is a musical with music and lyrics by Cole Porter, and the book by Dwight Taylor and Reginald Lawrence. The show, an adaptation of Plautus's comedy Amphitryon, first opened on Broadway in 1950.

== Synopsis ==
The Roman gods Mercury and Jupiter are in search of some entertainment of the human kind. The focus of their attention is a young bride, Helen, and her husband, Art. Mercury joins the two on their trip to Athens, intending to put himself between the blushing newlyweds. While the men are busy chasing Helen, the goddess Juno (Jupiter's wife) is playing games of her own, with inept gangster Nikki as her reluctant sidekick.

== Songs ==
Act 1

- I Jupiter, I Rex – Jupiter and Ensemble
- Use Your Imagination – Mercury and Helen
- Hail, Hail, Hail – Vulcania, Mercury and Ensemble
- I Got Beauty – Juno and Ensemble
- Maiden Fair – Ensemble
- Where, Oh, Where – Chloe and Dancer Boys and Girls
- I Am Loved – Helen
- They Couldn't Compare to You – Mercury, Singing Girls and Dancing Girls
- What Do You Think About Men? – Helen, Chloe and Juno
- Dance – Night
- I Sleep Easier Now – Juno
- Ballet – Night, Strephon and Dancing Ensemble

Act 2

- Climb Up the Mountain – Juno, Niki Skolianos and Company
- No Lover for Me – Helen
- Cherry Pies Ought to Be You – Mercury, Chloe, Juno and Niki Skolianos
- I Am Loved (Reprise) – Helen
- Hark to the Song of the Night – Jupiter
- Dance – Strephon, Chloe and Ensemble
- Nobody's Chasing Me – Juno
- Dance – Ensemble
- Use Your Imagination (Reprise) – Entire Company

== Productions ==
Out of This World began pre-Broadway tryouts on November 4, 1950 at the Shubert Theatre, Philadelphia, and then moved to the Shubert Theatre, Boston on November 28, 1950. The musical opened on Broadway at the New Century Theatre on December 21, 1950 and closed on May 5, 1951 after 157 performances. Staging was by Agnes De Mille, additional direction by George Abbott and choreography was by Hanya Holm. The cast featured George Gaynes as Jupiter, Charlotte Greenwood as Juno, Priscilla Gillette as Helen, David Burns as Nikki, William Eythe as Art O'Malley, and William Redfield as Mercury.

The Encores! New York City Center Series concert production ran from March 30 – April 1, 1995, directed by Mark Brokaw with choreography by John Carrafa. The song "From This Moment On" that had been dropped from the original Broadway production was used, with orchestration by Jonathan Tunick and sung by Helen (Marin Mazzie) and Art (Gregg Edelman). The cast also included Andrea Martin (Juno), Peter Scolari (Mercury), and La Chanze (Chloe).

== Response ==
In the role of Juno, eccentric dancer Charlotte Greenwood's hit comic numbers were "Nobody's Chasing Me", "Climb Up The Mountain", and "I Sleep Easier Now". Brooks Atkinson described Greenwood's performance as "warmhearted clowning"; she "throws her head back when she plunges into a song. She plays a few tricks with a collapsible camera tripod. She moves around the stage in a sort of grotesque crouch. And once, in the happiest moment of the show, she swings those long legs in a cartwheel-motion that delighted New Yorkers after the first World War, and delights New Yorkers of today."

The New York Post was complimentary: "'Out of This World' is a fine, beautiful, and imaginative new musical comedy with attractive and characteristic Cole Porter songs, a handsome production, some splendidly dynamic dancing, an attractive cast, and a good story that is an excellent combination of the humorous and the romantic. It is first-rate entertainment."

Ethan Mordden commented in his book Coming Up Roses: The Broadway Musical in the 1950s (Oxford University Press): "Something went wrong, because after a hectic tryout period the show opened in New York to tepid reviews, and the gala score couldn't produce a single hit. (It had had one till Abbott threw out "From This Moment On" in Boston, apparently because William Eythe, a non-singer, was killing his half of the whirlwind love duet. Why didn't Abbott reassign the number to Redfield and Ashley, whose characters it would in fact have suited?) I blame Dwight Taylor, for his original plan was misconceived and humorless...It was too silly, too given to masquerade and unmotivated appearances, as 1920s musicals had been."
