= Always True to You in My Fashion =

1948 show tune by Cole Porter

"Always True to You in My Fashion" is a 1948 show tune by Cole Porter, written for the musical Kiss Me, Kate. It is based on Non Sum Qualis Eram Bonae sub Regno Cynarae, a similarly ironic poem by the English Decadent poet Ernest Dowson (1867–1900), which has the refrain 'I have been faithful to thee, Cynara! in my fashion,' and which was probably inspired by Dowson's lifelong friend Adelaide Foltinowicz, who never returned his devotion. The phrase "faithful in my fashion" entered the language before the song was written, and was the title of a 1946 Hollywood film.

The singer protests that she is always faithful to her main love in her own way, despite seeing, and accepting gifts from, wealthy men. The strong ironic innuendo is that she trades sexual favours for gifts. The song is full of wordplay, such as the spoonerism "If the Harris pat means a Paris hat …"

The song begins with a reprise of "Why Can't You Behave", sung by Bill and Lois, before going into the main song.

The Chorus ends with the lines: "but, I'm Always True to You, Darlin', in My Fashion. Yes, I'm Always True to You, Darlin', in My Way". One Chorus is sung in French.

The song is sung in the second half of the show by Lois (Bianca) to her love interest, Bill (Lucentio), who has become frustrated with Lois' penchant for older wealthy men. Broadway actress and singer Lisa Kirk, who originated the role of Lois/Bianca, introduced the song in the second act of the original (1948) production. It was performed in the 1953 film version by Ann Miller and Tommy Rall.

== Other versions ==
The song has been notably sung by Ella Fitzgerald, Eartha Kitt, Blossom Dearie, Jo Stafford, Peggy Lee (with George Shearing), Della Reese on her Della Della Cha-Cha-Cha album (1961), and by Julie London in 1961 (on the LP album (Liberty Records LST-7192) Whatever Julie Wants)

== Cultural references ==
Porter wondered whether Clark Gable would object to his name being used in the song, in which it is implied that Gable is one of Lois's lovers ("Mister Gable, I mean Clark / Wants me on his boat to park"). Gable was delighted upon hearing the song, along with his name's being mentioned in the lyric.

In some versions of the lyrics, there are references to the Back Bay neighborhood of Boston and Mack the Knife from the Threepenny Opera.

The song is the basis for the number "I Always, Always, Never Get My Man", performed by actress Jane Krakowski, in episode 5 of the television show Schmigadoon!. Both songs feature a similar structure and use of wordplay.
