= Ryan Scott Oliver =

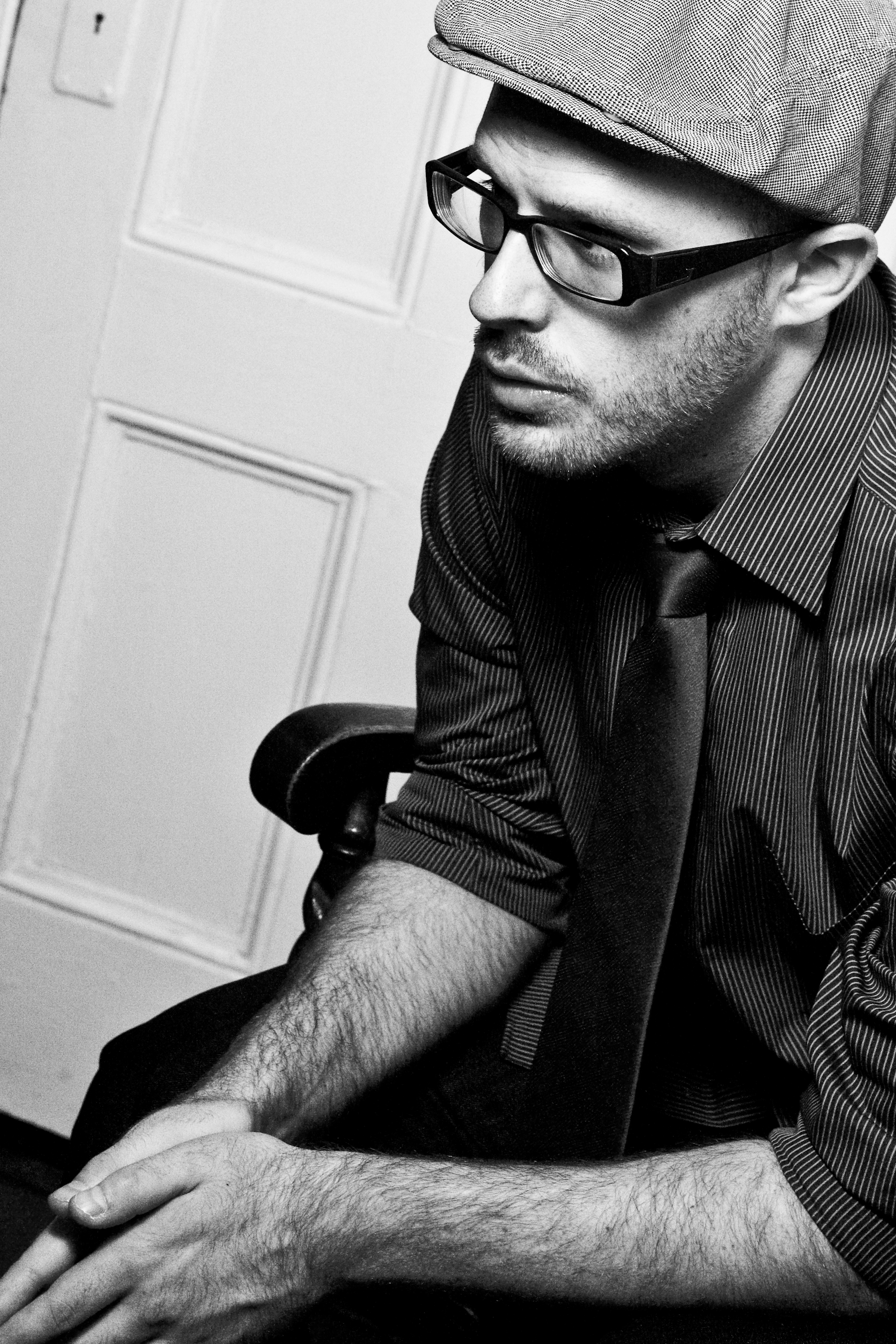

Background information
- Born: August 27, 1984 (age 42); Pasadena, California
- Occupations: Composer, lyricist
- Website: www.ryanscottoliver.com

Ryan Scott Oliver (born August 27, 1984) is an American musical theatre composer and lyricist. He is a 2011 Lucille Lortel Award Nominee and the recipient of both the 2009 Jonathan Larson Grant and the 2008 Richard Rodgers Award for Musical Theater. Oliver is an adjunct professor at Pace University in New York, and Artistic Director of the Pasadena Musical Theatre Program in California. He received his B.A. in Music Composition from UCLA and his M.F.A. in Musical Theatre Writing from the Tisch School of the Arts at New York University. He is also the creator of the blog Crazytown and a member of ASCAP. Oliver's work has been performed at the Writers Guild Awards, Off Broadway in TheatreWorksUSA's We the People, and in countless showcases.

Ryan, along with actress Lindsay Mendez, founded and currently runs Actor Therapy; a five-week training experience for young actors in NYC.

He is gay and is married to photographer Matthew Murphy.

== Early life ==
Oliver was born in Pasadena, California and his interest in musicals began at 9 years old when he joined a local summer musical theater camp. In 2004, Oliver took over the program as Artistic Director and renamed it the Pasadena Musical Theatre Program. Oliver also attended the Los Angeles County High School for the Arts.

== Works ==
=== Mrs. Sharp ===
Mrs. Sharp, with music and lyrics by Oliver and book by Kirsten Guenther, is loosely based on the 1991 teacher-student sex scandal and murder trial surrounding Pamela Smart. The musical was first performed at NYU in 2007 with Alex Brightman, Scott Evans, and Ali Stroker under the direction of Ryan Mekenian. Additional performances of the work occurred at an ASCAP concert musically directed by Alex Lacamoire also starring Brightman, Stroker, and directed by Mekenian.

Mrs. Sharp was ultimately given a staged reading at Playwrights Horizons in 2009 directed by Michael Greif with Jane Krakowski as the title character. Playwright Horizons described Mrs. Sharp as:

[T]he story of a woman who "wants you to become more." Having written an unsuccessful self-help series entitled Invent Yourself: Five Words to Live By, 31-year-old Kimberly Sharp is encouraged by her husband to take a job teaching at the local high school. Kimberly sets out to change the lives of her students, absorbing them into her web of fantastical delusions and private affairs. But when her husband discovers she's gone just a bit too far, Kimberly realizes only one thing can be done about him. Someone goes to jail, someone becomes a beloved self-help guru and someone gets shot in the head — but everyone learns a lesson from Mrs. Sharp.

=== Darling ===
Darling, conceived by Brett Ryback and with the book, music and lyrics by Oliver, is a dark retelling of J.M. Barrie's Peter Pan. It follows sixteen year-old Darling in 1920s New England, and her adventures with Peter, a rent-boy. With him, she explores the seedy underground world of drugs, sex, and a white powder called Dust. Darling was featured on the "Bound for Broadway" episode of NBC's The Apprentice in 2010, and was presented by Pace New Musicals Program in 2009, and in 2012, was given a private workshop and developmental production as a collaboration between Retrop Production and RareWorks Theatre Company, in association with Sh-K-Boom Records, at Emerson College. In 2013, Darling received The Weston Playhouse Theatre Company New Musical Award. In 2019, a staged reading of "Darling" was performed at NYU's Steinhardt School of Culture, Education and Human Development.

=== 35MM: A Musical Exhibition ===
35MM: A Musical Exhibition (or just 35MM) is a multimedia anthology song cycle in which each song is paired with a photograph. Most songs in the show were inspired by photos taken by Oliver's partner Matthew Murphy, while many of the songs inspired new photographs in turn. The songs were released in an original cast recording by the label Ghostlight in 2012 starring Betsy Wolfe, Lindsay Mendez, Alex Brightman, Jay Armstrong Johnson, and Ben Crawford. A full developmental production was presented at Urban Stages in December 2010, directed by Daisy Prince. 35MM made its Off-Broadway World Premiere at the Galapagos Art Space in New York City on March 7, 2012 starring Lindsay Mendez. Due to popular demand, the show was extended and sold out its run. 35MM is currently being licensed and has received productions in Baltimore, Maryland; Dayton, Ohio; London; and Canada in 2013. In June 2015, it made its Australian premiere in the inaugural season of Hayward Street's Incubator Series in Brisbane, Queensland. Half a Soul Productions presented a performance in August 2025 at the Laurie Beechman Theater in New York City.

=== Jasper in Deadland ===
Jasper in Deadland is a pop-rock musical based on the myth of Orpheus and Eurydice. It follows 16-year-old Jasper Jarvis as he travels through the Afterlife on a mission to save his best friend, Agnes. Jasper in Deadland was commissioned in 2011 for the Pasadena Musical Theatre Program, and premiered as part of the Los Angeles Festival of New Musicals. In 2014 it was produced by Prospect Theater Company at the West End Theatre in New York City starring Matt Doyle, Ben Crawford, Allison Scagliotti, and Bonnie Milligan and directed by Brandon Ivie. In 2015, it had a tryout at the 5th Avenue Theatre in Seattle, Washington, with Matt Doyle, Sydney Shepherd, and Louis Hobson and directed by Brandon Ivie. In February 2016 at Studio 54 a CD release concert was held starring Matt Doyle and Sydney Shepard. The CD was released in May 2016.

=== We Foxes ===
We Foxes, a Southern gothic thriller set in Missouri, 1945, is a new project started commissioned by Broadway Across America. We Foxes tells about Willa, a tough and unmannered orphan girl adopted by the Sheriff's Wife, a calculating socialite, and the bloody domestic war that ensues between them when the girl uncovers the terrible secrets lurking beneath the floorboards. Oliver attended the TheatreWorks Silicon Valley Writer's Retreat in April 2013 for We Foxes. This show was also featured at CAP 21 and the Weston Playhouse.

=== Tomorrow, the Island Dies ===
Tomorrow, the Island Dies is a folk horror musical set on the small fictional island of Haverness. It follows a Widow Clack, a pregnant 18-year-old girl who runs a lighthouse with her brother, Benji Clack, in a time where climate change will imminently lead to the ocean destroying Haverness. The young adult population of the island plans to abandon Haverness within a couple of days when a dead body washes ashore, and the group falls into division with accusations against each other. The musical was commissioned by Samford University and Chelsea Reynolds Nicholson in 2021 after she listened to Oliver's Future Demons EP. It was originally released as a concept album on October 6, 2023, featuring nine songs, which was produced by Oliver, Very Intense Productions, AT New Works, and its musical director, Joshua Zecher-Ross, with performers including Jason Gotay, Victoria Huston-Elem, Jisel Soleil Ayon, Shelby Acosta, Kim Onah, Charlie Fusari, Miranda Luze, Ethan Carlson, Nathan David Smith, Tristan Caldwell, Caitlin Doak, Nicole DeLuca, Jack Murphy, and Grace Ellis Solomon. It premiered on April 11, 2024 for four nights at Samford University in a production directed by Nicholson. A full original cast album was later released on October 22, 2024, alongside a private reading of the show on November 7 of the same year.

=== Other works ===
- Music+Lyrics by Ryan Scott Oliver: Vol. I: Oliver's first songbook, published by Hal Leonard.
- The Frog Prince Continued, commissioned by Chicago's Emerald City Theatre
- Rated RSO: A collection of Oliver's work which has been performed at the Kennedy Center, New York Musical Theatre Festival, Joe's Pub, Pace University, and Boston Court Performing Arts Center
- Circle 9: a One-Act Musical: Music by Brian Valencia, book and lyrics by Oliver
- Angus Oblong's The Debbies, A Ten Minute Musical: Music by Oliver and book and lyrics by Gordon Leary, inspired by characters from Angus Oblong's Creepy Susie and 13 Other Tragic Tales for Troubled Children and The Oblongs
- Out of my Head, A Musical Revue: Music and lyrics by Oliver, book by Kirsten Guenther
- Quit India: Book, music, and lyrics by B.T. Ryback and Oliver, is a musical retelling of the opera Lakmé

== Awards ==
- 2013 The Weston Playhouse Theatre Company New Musical Award (for Darling)
- 2009 Jonathan Larson Grant Recipient
- 2008 Richard Rodgers Award for Musical Theater Winner (for Mrs. Sharp)
- 2007 ASCAP Foundation Harold Adamson Lyric Award Recipient
- 2007 Margo Lion Award for Excellence in Adaptation for Alive at Ten with Kristen Guenther
- 2007 Dramatist Guild Fellowship
