= & Juliet =

2019 jukebox musical

- Poster for the West End production
- Music: Max Martin and others Arranged by: Bill Sherman
- Lyrics: Max Martin and others
- Book: David West Read
- Basis: Romeo and Juliet by William Shakespeare
- Premiere: 2019: Manchester Opera House
- Productions: 2019 Manchester; 2019 West End; 2022 Broadway; 2024 UK & Ireland tour 2024 US tour

& Juliet is a 2019 jukebox musical featuring the music of Swedish pop songwriter Max Martin, with a book by David West Read, in which Anne Hathaway negotiates with her husband, William Shakespeare, to change the ending to Romeo and Juliet so that Juliet does not kill herself. Juliet's parents plan to send her to a convent, so she flees to Paris, accompanied by her nurse, a friend and Anne herself, who writes herself into the play as a new character, "April". Shakespeare resists Anne's ideas, and the story unfolds as a tug-of-war between the two writers, with Juliet consequently buffeted between lovers and advisers, as Anne seeks a happy ending for her.

& Juliet premiered at the Manchester Opera House in September 2019, before transferring to the West End in November 2019. At the 2020 Laurence Olivier Awards, & Juliet received nine nominations and won three awards, including Best Actress in a Musical for Miriam-Teak Lee in the title role. The West End production also received a record-breaking 13 nominations at the 2020 WhatsOnStage Awards, ultimately winning six awards. The 2022 Broadway production was nominated for nine Tony Awards, but did not win any.

== Synopsis ==
=== Act One ===
William Shakespeare is celebrated by the cast, at his first production of Romeo and Juliet, and welcomes the audience to his newest play ("Larger than Life"). Shakespeare introduces his wife, Anne Hathaway, who is visiting from Stratford-upon-Avon to see the play. She suggests he change the ending, wondering what would have happened if Juliet did not kill herself; Shakespeare greets the idea with displeasure ("I Want It That Way"). Nevertheless, he allows his wife to explain her idea for the further events of the play, beginning with Juliet waking up to find Romeo dead ("...Baby One More Time").

At Romeo's funeral, Juliet finds out that Romeo had many other relationships, with both men and women ("Show Me the Meaning of Being Lonely") and, upon learning of their forbidden relationship, Juliet's parents decide they will send her to a convent. May, Juliet's non-binary friend, and Angelique, her nurse, come to her rescue, while Anne writes herself into the play as "April", another of Juliet's friends. The four of them decide to take a road trip to Paris ("Domino"). Anne writes Shakespeare into the story as the carriage driver, and the trip to Paris begins ("Show Me Love").

In France, a party is planned for François du Bois, a sensitive young musician. His father, Lance, tells him he must either marry or join the army, even though François does not wish to pursue either option. Juliet, Angelique, May, and April sneak into the party ("Blow"). François notices their arrival but does not mind them crashing his party. May tells Juliet about their struggles as a non-binary person in a binary world ("I'm Not a Girl, Not Yet a Woman"). François and Juliet begin to bond about their stifled lives and shared experiences ("Overprotected"). François finds himself attracted to Juliet, and they dance together ("Confident").

Angelique and Lance spend the night together, and it is revealed that she was formerly the nurse to his children. Lance asks her to stay, while Angelique wants to continue to mentor Juliet ("Teenage Dream/Break Free"). Juliet wakes up next to François, who proposes, but Juliet worries about rushing into a new relationship so soon after her tumultuous romance with Romeo ("Oops!... I Did It Again"). When her parents arrive to take her to the convent, however, she quickly accepts François's proposal. Anne is irritated that Shakespeare has taken up the quill to force Juliet into another abrupt marriage; she complains that he never writes about happy marriages.

Determined to introduce a conflict or a plot twist to Anne's version of the play, Shakespeare has François and May meet again. After the two share a sudden kiss, they both feel conflicted ("I Kissed a Girl"). Complicating situations, Shakespeare decides to bring Romeo back from the dead, despite Anne's protests. Romeo makes a flashy entrance, saying that he has come back for his wife ("It's My Life").

=== Act Two ===
The arrogant, selfish Romeo finds Juliet, "forgives" her for not killing herself, and demands that she return to the marriage ("Love Me Like You Do"). Juliet reveals to Romeo that she is engaged to François ("Since U Been Gone"). Shakespeare is frustrated with Anne because Juliet did not submit to Romeo's view of events. Anne counters that giving Juliet's story a happy ending is important to her and protests that Shakespeare cares more about his plays than his family. Anne breaks Shakespeare's quill, so that neither of them can make further changes to the story. Meanwhile, May is annoyed that François is ignoring May's feelings and still planning on marrying Juliet ("Whataya Want from Me"), while Juliet complains to May that Romeo lied to and cheated on her. François is conflicted and increasingly uneasy because he hasn't told Juliet about his feelings for May.

Juliet meets again with Romeo, who reflects that he only ever felt valued for his looks and says that Juliet made him want to be a better person ("One More Try"). Despite their recent bonding, Juliet remains uncertain of her feelings towards Romeo ("Problem/Can't Feel My Face"). François's brother (in fact Shakespeare in disguise) invites Romeo to join the family band, which is booked to play at Juliet and François' wedding. Angelique, in the meantime, proposes to Lance.

Anne discovers that Juliet is still in love with Romeo and recounts her own romance with Shakespeare ("That's the Way It Is"). At the wedding, Lance, François, Shakespeare, May, and Romeo perform ("Everybody"). François reads his vows to Juliet ("As Long as You Love Me"). Confused by them, Juliet reneges on the marriage, and François confesses his feelings for May ("It's Gonna Be Me"). This prompts Romeo to again profess his love for Juliet, while her parents insist she return to Verona with them, which Juliet refuses to do ("Stronger"). Lance apologizes to François for trying to control his actions and accepts his and May's relationship ("Shape of My Heart"). Angelique reassures Juliet that she will never leave her ("Fuckin' Perfect"), but Juliet insists Angelique go with Lance, before taking charge of her own destiny ("Roar").

Shakespeare complains that Anne has ruined his play, and that he only brought back Romeo to give Juliet the happy ending he thought Anne wanted. Anne refutes this, saying she wants Juliet to be able to make her own choices. Realizing he has hurt Anne, Shakespeare apologizes ("I Want It That Way – Reprise"). Shakespeare and Anne agree there does not need to be a conclusive ending, rather a new beginning. Romeo apologizes to Juliet, and they decide to go on a first date, while Angelique and Lance get married, and François and May begin a relationship ("Can't Stop the Feeling!").

== Cast and characters ==
Character	Manchester	West End	Broadway	UK Tour	US Tour
Character	2019		2022	2024	
Juliet Capulet	Miriam-Teak Lee	Miriam-Teak Lee	Lorna Courtney	Gerardine Sacdalan	Rachel Webb
Anne Hathaway/April	Cassidy Janson	Cassidy Janson	Betsy Wolfe	Lara Denning	Teal Wicks
William Shakespeare	Oliver Tompsett	Oliver Tompsett	Stark Sands	Matt Cardle	Corey Mach
Lance Du Bois	David Bedella	David Bedella	Paulo Szot	Dr Ranj Singh	Paul-Jordan Jansen
May	Arun Blair-Mangat	Arun Blair-Mangat	Justin David Sullivan	Jordan Broatch	Nick Drake
Romeo Montague	Jordan Luke Gage	Jordan Luke Gage	Ben Jackson Walker	Jack Danson	Michael Canu
Angélique/Nurse	Melanie La Barrie	Melanie La Barrie	Melanie La Barrie	Sandra Marvin	Kathryn Allison
François Du Bois	Tim Mahendran	Tim Mahendran	Philippe Arroyo	Kyle Cox	Mateus Leite Cardoso

=== Notable cast replacements ===
West End (2019–23)

- Romeo Montague: Tom Francis
- Angelique/Nurse: Keala Settle
- May: Jo Foster

Broadway (2022–)

- Juliet Capulet: Maya Boyd
- William Shakespeare: Oliver Tompsett, Drew Gehling, Corey Mach
- Anne Hathaway: Alison Luff, Teal Wicks
- Lance Du Bois: David Bedella, Joey Fatone, Hayden Tee, James Monroe Iglehart
- Angelique/Nurse: Charity Angél Dawson, Kandi Burruss

UK Tour (2024–25)

- William Shakespeare: Jay McGuiness
- Lance Du Bois: Lee Latchford-Evans

== Musical numbers ==
& Juliet is a jukebox musical and features existing music co-written by Max Martin, except for the new original song "One More Try", performed on the cast recording by Jessie J.

A number of songs were cut or replaced in the show's workshops, including "Send My Love (To Your New Lover)" by Adele, "22" by Taylor Swift and "I Don't Believe You" by P!nk.

Performer(s)	Song	Original Artist
Act 1
Shakespeare and Company	"Larger than Life"	Backstreet Boys
Anne, Shakespeare and Company	"I Want It That Way"	Backstreet Boys
Juliet	"...Baby One More Time"	Britney Spears
Rosaline, Anne, Shakespeare, Lord Capulet, Lady Capulet, Juliet and Company	"Show Me the Meaning of Being Lonely"	Backstreet Boys
Juliet, Anne, Angelique and May	"Domino"	Jessie J
Juliet, Anne, Angelique, May and Company	"Show Me Love"	Robyn
Juliet, Anne, Angelique, May and Company	"Blow"	Kesha
May and Juliet	"I'm Not a Girl, Not Yet a Woman"	Britney Spears
François and Juliet	"Overprotected"	Britney Spears
Juliet, François, Angelique and Company	"Confident"	Demi Lovato
Angelique and Lance	"Teenage Dream" / "Break Free"	Katy Perry / Ariana Grande feat. Zedd
Juliet and Angelique	"Oops!...I Did It Again"	Britney Spears
May, François, and Company	"I Kissed a Girl"	Katy Perry
Romeo, Shakespeare, Juliet, Anne and Company	"It's My Life"	Bon Jovi
Act 2
Romeo	"Love Me like You Do"	Ellie Goulding
Juliet and Female Ensemble	"Since U Been Gone"	Kelly Clarkson
May and François	"Whataya Want from Me"	Adam Lambert
Juliet, Romeo and Company	"One More Try"	Original song
Juliet, Romeo and Company	"Problem" / "Can't Feel My Face"	Ariana Grande and Iggy Azalea / The Weeknd
Anne and Juliet	"That's the Way It Is"	Céline Dion
Shakespeare, Romeo, May, François, Lance and Company	"Everybody (Backstreet's Back)"	Backstreet Boys
François	"As Long as You Love Me"	Backstreet Boys
François and May	"It's Gonna Be Me"	*NSYNC
Juliet	"Stronger"	Britney Spears
Lance, François and May	"Shape of My Heart"	Backstreet Boys
Angelique and Company	"Fuckin' Perfect"	P!nk
Juliet and Company	"Roar"	Katy Perry
Shakespeare, Anne, Juliet, Romeo and Company	"I Want It That Way" (Reprise)	Backstreet Boys
Shakespeare, Anne and Company	"Can't Stop the Feeling!"	Justin Timberlake

== Productions ==
=== Manchester (2019) ===
& Juliet premiered at the Manchester Opera House, running from 10 September to 12 October 2019. The cast starred Miriam-Teak Lee as Juliet. The rest of the cast included Oliver Tompsett as Shakespeare, Cassidy Janson as Anne/April, Melanie La Barrie as Angelique the Nurse, David Bedella as Lance, Jordan Luke Gage as Romeo, Arun Blair-Mangat as May and Tim Mahendran as François.

=== West End (2019–2023) ===
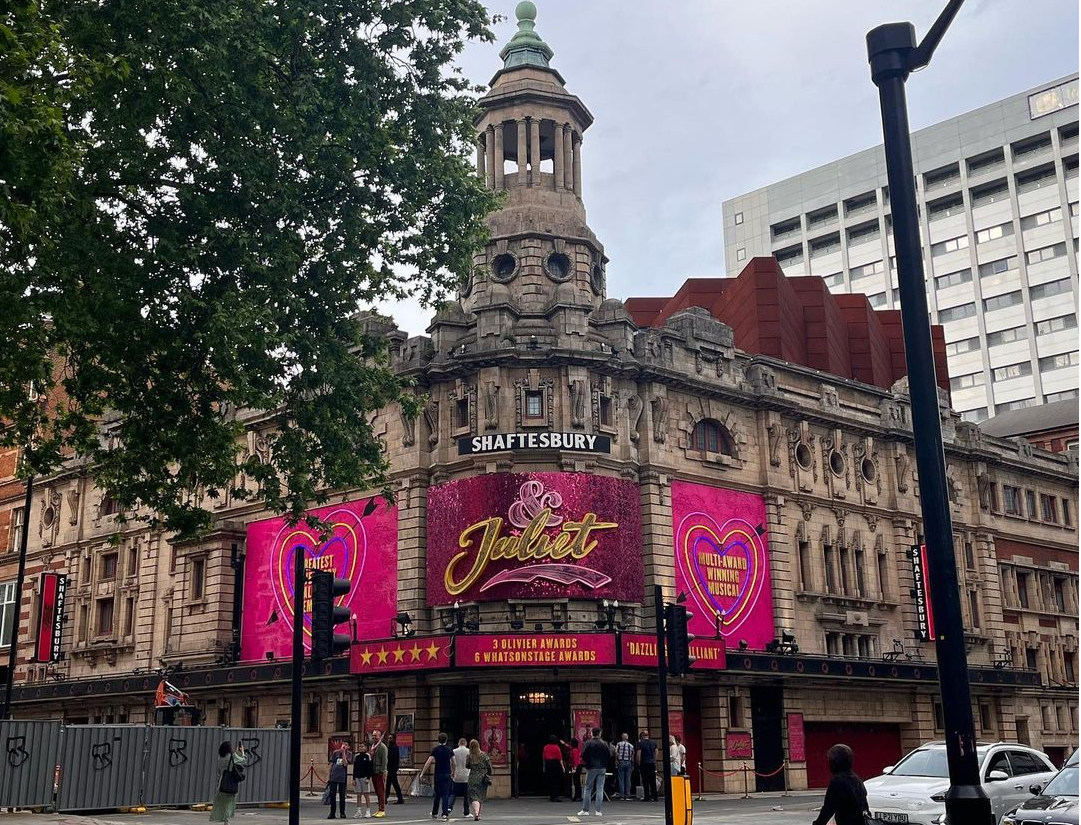
Branding as seen at the Shaftesbury Theatre, May 2022

The show transferred to the West End at the Shaftesbury Theatre on 2 November 2019, in previews, ahead of an official opening on 20 November 2019. All of the cast from the Manchester run of the show transferred for the West End engagement, directed by Luke Sheppard.

In 2020, the show was nominated for 9 Olivier Awards, winning 3 awards. Miriam-Teak Lee won Best Actress in a Musical for her role as Juliet, Cassidy Janson won Best Actress in a Supporting Role for her role as Anne / April and David Bedella won Best Actor in a Supporting Role for his role as Lance.

On 16 March 2020, the show suspended production due to the COVID-19 pandemic. & Juliet resumed performances on 24 September 2021. All of the main cast returned to the show, with the exception of Blair-Mangat, whose role as May was taken over by Alex Thomas-Smith.

On 26 March 2022, La Barrie, Bedella and Gage departed & Juliet. The role of Nurse/Angelique was played by Keala Settle, in her West End debut, from 29 March until 18 June 2022. Julius D'Silva was Lance and Tom Francis was Romeo.

The West End production closed on 25 March 2023.

=== Toronto (2022, 2025–2026) ===
& Juliet had a pre-Broadway engagement at the Princess of Wales Theatre in Toronto, Canada. It was scheduled to open in February 2021 but was postponed as a result of the COVID-19 pandemic. It opened on 22 June 2022 and ran through 14 August 2022. It starred Lorna Courtney as Juliet, with Stark Sands as Shakespeare, Betsy Wolfe as Anne/April, Melanie La Barrie reprising her role as Angelique the Nurse, Paulo Szot as Lance, Ben Jackson Walker as Romeo, Justin David Sullivan as May and Philippe Arroyo as François.

In 2025, & Juliet returned to Toronto with an all-Canadian cast at the Royal Alexandra Theatre. The cast includes Vanessa Sears as Juliet, David Silvestri as Lance, Julia McLellan as Anne, George Krissa as Shakespeare, Matt Raffy as May, Sarah Nairne as Angélique, David Jeffery as Romeo, and Brandon Antonio as François. It opened on 14 December 2025 and closed on 2 August 2026.

=== Broadway (2022–present) ===
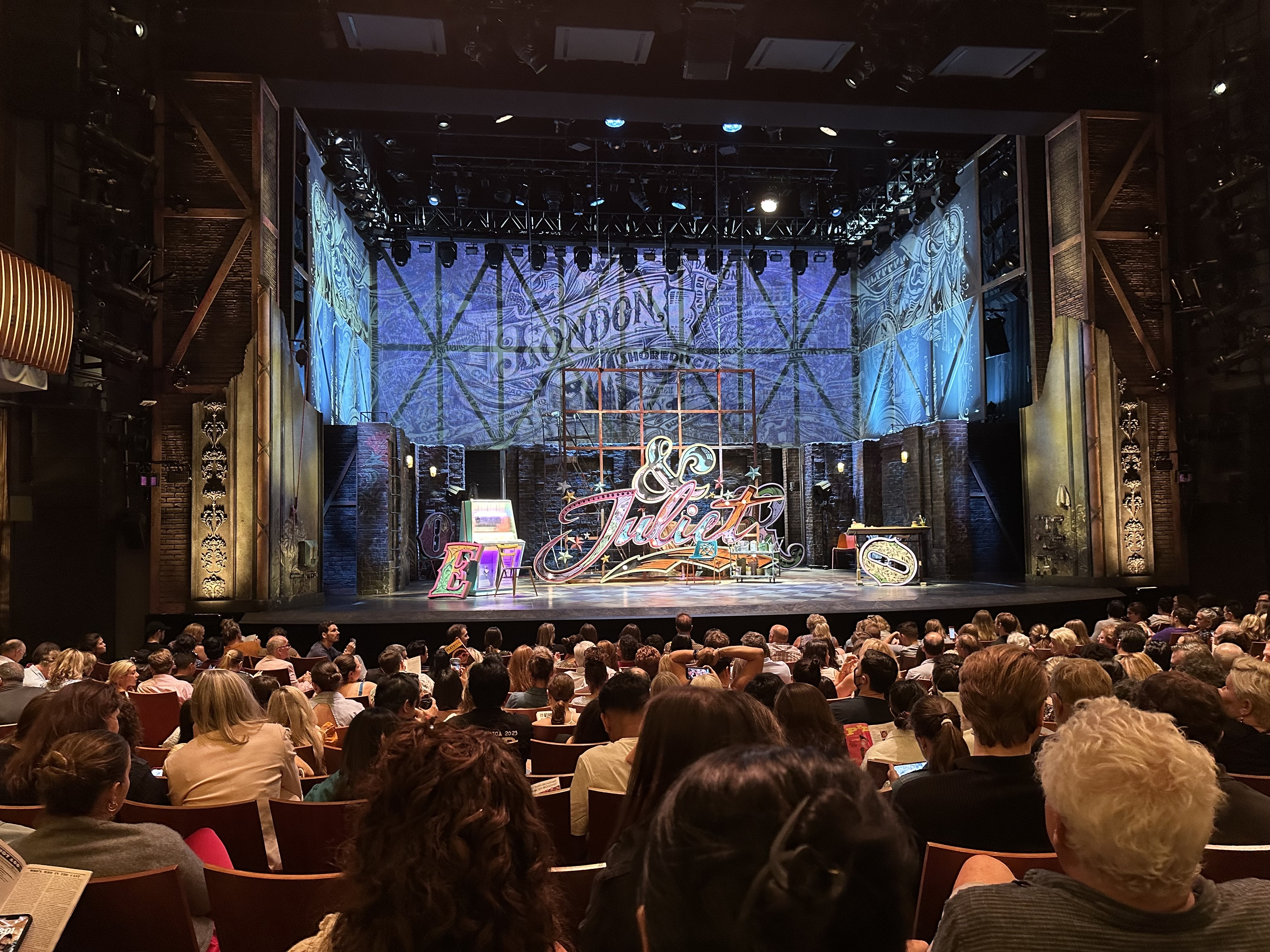
& Juliet set on Broadway in Manhattan in July 2023

The 2022 Toronto production transferred to Broadway at the Stephen Sondheim Theatre, with previews on 28 October 2022 ahead of an official opening on 17 November 2022. The producers on Broadway are Max Martin, Tim Headington, Theresa Steele Page, Jenny Petersson, Martin Dodd, Eva Price, Lukasz Gottwald, 42nd.club (Phil Kenny, Tom McGrath and Marc Hershberg), Independent Presenters Network, Jack Lane, Library Company, Shellback, Shivhans Pictures, Sing Out, Louise!, Kim Szarzynski, Taylor/Riegler, Tenenbaum/Keyes, Barry Weiss and John Gore Organization. On 2 May 2023, the production received nine Tony Award nominations, including Best Musical. The production is scheduled to close on 3 January 2027

=== Melbourne (2023) ===
Its first Australian performances were at the Regent Theatre in February 2023. The Australian cast starred Lorinda May Merrypor as Juliet, with Rob Mills as Shakespeare, Amy Lehpamer as Anne/April, Casey Donovan as Angelique the Nurse, Hayden Tee as Lance, Blake Appelqvist as Romeo, Jesse Dutlow as May and Yashith Fernando as François.

The show opened with previews on 26 February 2023, ahead of an official opening on 9 March 2023, before closing on 29 July 2023, with the show having been set to reopen for a run at Singapore's Sands Theatre in Marina Bay in September.

=== Singaporean and Australian Tour (2023–2024) ===
Following the closure of the Melbourne production, the Australian cast toured to Singapore, opening on 21 September at the Sands Theatre in Marina Bay; it closed on 15 October 2023. It continued to the Crown Theatre in Perth, opening on 30 December 2023. It then had previews from 27 February to 6 March 2024, before an official opening on 8 March at the Sydney Lyric. The Australian production closed in Sydney on 12 July 2024.

=== UK tour (2024–2025) ===
A UK tour began at the musical's original venue, the Manchester Opera House, on 8 July 2024, before continuing across the UK and Ireland.

=== North American Tour (2024–present) ===
A North American tour began in Baltimore, Maryland, on 22 September 2024. Rachel Webb starred as Juliet, with Corey Mach as Shakespeare, Paul-Jordan Jansen as Lance, Teal Wicks as Anne/April, Nick Drake as May, Kathryn Allison as Angelique, Michael Canu as Romeo and Mateus Leite Cardoso as François. The producers of the North American tour are Max Martin, Tim Headington, Theresa Steele Page, Jenny Petersson, Martin Dodd, Eva Price, Lukasz Gottwald, 42nd.club (Phil Kenny, Tom McGrath and Marc Hershberg), Independent Presenters Network, Jack Lane, Library Company, Shellback, Shivhans Pictures, Sing Out, Louise!, Kim Szarzynski, Taylor/Riegler, Tenenbaum/Keyes, Barry Weiss and John Gore Organization.

=== International productions (2024–present) ===
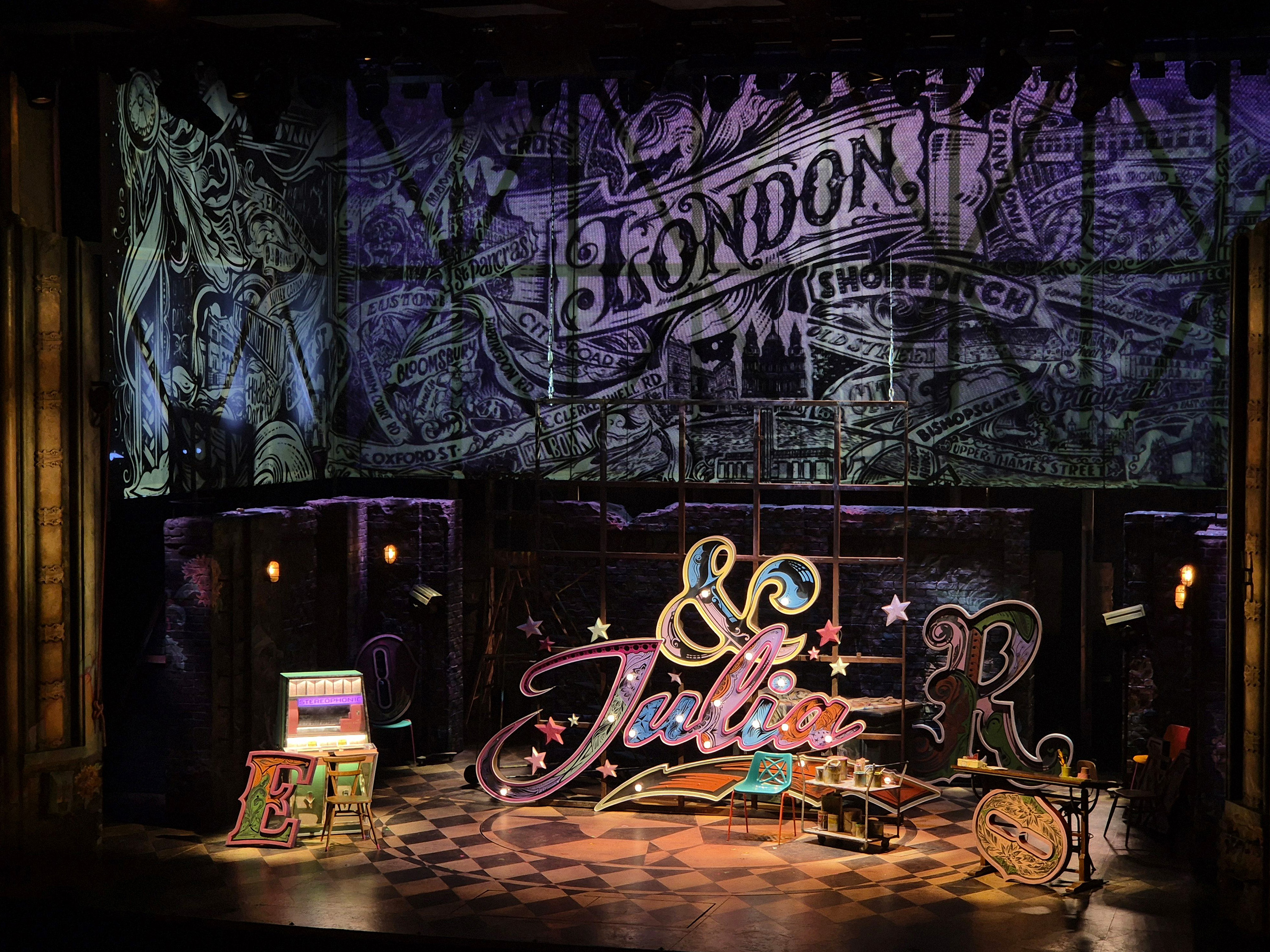
& Julia set in Hamburg

A German production titled & Julia starred Chiara Fuhrmann as Juliet, with Willemijn Verkaik as Anne/April, Raphael Groß as Romeo and Andreas Bongard as Shakespeare. It opened at the Operettenhaus in Hamburg on 30 October 2024 and closed on 1 February 2026.

A Swedish production titled & Julia began on 19 February 2026, starring Joanné Nugas as Juliet, Viktor Norén as Shakespeare and Oscar Zia as Romeo.

The first New Zealand production opened on 9 April 2026, starring Kristin Paulse as Juliet, Awhimai Fraser as Anne, Matu Ngaropo as Shakespeare, Lavina Williams as Angelique, Andrew Grainger as Lance, and Andrew Papas as Romeo.

=== Planned productions ===
A Dutch production was expected to begin previews on 24 September 2026. The official opening is set for 7 October 2026.

In October 2026, the German-language production, which closed in February 2026, will move to the Stage Palladium Theater in Stuttgart.

== Reception ==
& Juliet's West End run, which began officially on 20 November 2019, opened to generally mixed reviews, with criticism centered on its shallow plot and lack of meaningful themes. However, the cast, crew, and music received some praise. The show was also praised for its representation of a non-binary character.

& Juliet had positive reviews upon its Broadway release 17 November 2022. Some praised its high energy and its easy and fun tone, calling it a "breath of fresh air" for the general populace during the tumultuous time which it was released in. It was also praised for the diverse casting and its sense of humour. However, others critiqued the immaturity of its politics and the lack of clear foundation, and saying that the spectacle is "overcompensating."

The show opened to positive reviews in Melbourne, with critics citing strong cast performances and the music as the show's strengths, despite the book's weaknesses.

== Awards ==
=== Original West End production ===
Year	Award	Category	Nominee	Result
2020	Laurence Olivier Awards	Best New Musical		Nominated
2020	Laurence Olivier Awards	Best Actress in a Musical	Miriam-Teak Lee	Won
2020	Laurence Olivier Awards	Best Actor in a Supporting Role in a Musical	David Bedella	Won
2020	Laurence Olivier Awards	Best Actress in a Supporting Role in a Musical	Cassidy Janson	Won
2020	Laurence Olivier Awards	Best Theatre Choreographer	Jennifer Weber	Nominated
2020	Laurence Olivier Awards	Best Set Design	Soutra Gilmour	Nominated
2020	Laurence Olivier Awards	Best Costume Design	Paloma Young	Nominated
2020	Laurence Olivier Awards	Best Lighting Design	Howard Hudson	Nominated
2020	Laurence Olivier Awards	Outstanding Musical Contribution	Dominic Fallacaro and Bill Sherman	Nominated
2020	Black British Theatre Awards	Best Female Actor in a Musical	Miriam-Teak Lee	Won
2020	Mousetrap Awards	Best Musical		Nominated
2020	Mousetrap Awards	Spectacular Set		Won
2020	Mousetrap Awards	Best Female Performer	Miriam-Teak Lee	Nominated
2020	Mousetrap Awards	Saved The Day	Grace Mouat	Nominated

=== 2022 Broadway production ===
Year	Award	Category	Nominee	Result
2023	Tony Awards	Best Musical		Nominated
2023	Tony Awards	Best Book of a Musical	David West Read	Nominated
2023	Tony Awards	Best Actress in a Musical	Lorna Courtney	Nominated
2023	Tony Awards	Best Featured Actress in a Musical	Betsy Wolfe	Nominated
2023	Tony Awards	Best Costume Design of a Musical	Paloma Young	Nominated
2023	Tony Awards	Best Lighting Design of a Musical	Howard Hudson	Nominated
2023	Tony Awards	Best Sound Design of a Musical	Gareth Owen	Nominated
2023	Tony Awards	Best Choreography	Jennifer Weber	Nominated
2023	Tony Awards	Best Orchestrations	Bill Sherman and Dominic Fallacaro	Nominated
2023	Drama Desk Awards	Outstanding Musical		Nominated
2023	Drama Desk Awards	Outstanding Book of a Musical	David West Read	Nominated
2023	Outer Critics Circle Awards	Outstanding New Broadway Musical		Nominated
2023	Outer Critics Circle Awards	Outstanding Featured Performer in a Broadway Musical	Betsy Wolfe	Nominated
2023	Outer Critics Circle Awards	Outstanding Book of a Musical	David West Read	Nominated
2023	Outer Critics Circle Awards	Outstanding Costume Design	Paloma Young	Nominated
2023	Outer Critics Circle Awards	Outstanding Orchestrations	Bill Sherman	Nominated
2023	Outer Critics Circle Awards	Outstanding Choreography	Jennifer Weber	Nominated
2023	Chita Rivera Awards	Outstanding Ensemble in a Broadway Show		Nominated
2023	Chita Rivera Awards	Outstanding Choreography in a Broadway Show	Jennifer Weber	Nominated

== See also ==
- Once Upon a One More Time – a similar jukebox musical that modernizes fairy tales to the songs of Britney Spears.
- Bat Out of Hell: The Musical – rock musical based on the songs of Jim Steinman, with music, lyrics, and book by Steinman himself.
- In Dreams – a jukebox musical based on the songs of Roy Orbison, with a book by David West Read and directed by Luke Sheppard.
- I Should Be So Lucky – a jukebox musical based on the songs of Stock Aitken Waterman.
