= The 25th Annual Putnam County Spelling Bee =

Musical by William Finn and Rachel Sheinkin

- Original Cast Recording
- Music: William Finn
- Lyrics: William Finn
- Book: Rachel Sheinkin
- Basis: C-R-E-P-U-S-C-U-L-E by Rebecca Feldman
- Productions: 2004 Workshop; 2005 Off-Broadway; 2005 Broadway; 2006 Melbourne; 2007 US Tour; 2007 Seoul; 2010 Hong Kong; 2011 West End; 2012 Oslo; 2012 Jerusalem; 2013 Mexico City; 2017 Tel Aviv; 2024 Manila; 2024 Washington DC; 2025 Off-Broadway revival
- Awards: Tony Award for Best Book of a Musical; Drama Desk Award for Outstanding Book of a Musical; Lucille Lortel Award for Outstanding Musical; Helpmann Award for Best Musical

The 25th Annual Putnam County Spelling Bee is a musical comedy with music and lyrics by William Finn, with a book written by Rachel Sheinkin, created by Rebecca Feldman with additional material by Jay Reiss. The show centers on a fictional spelling bee set in a geographically ambiguous Putnam Valley Middle School, some students being from various elementary schools. These six quirky adolescents compete in the Bee, run by three equally quirky grown-ups.

The 2005 Broadway production, directed by James Lapine and produced by David Stone, James L. Nederlander, Barbara Whitman, Patrick Catullo, Barrington Stage Company and Second Stage Theater, earned good reviews and box-office success and was nominated for six Tony Awards, winning two, including Best Book. The show has spawned various other productions in the United States, and other countries.

An unusual aspect of the show is that four real audience members are invited on stage to compete in the spelling bee alongside the six young characters. During the 2005 Tony Awards, former presidential candidate Al Sharpton competed. Another amusing aspect of the show is that the official pronouncer, usually an improv comedian, provides ridiculous usage-in-a-sentence examples when asked to use words in a sentence. At some shows, adult-only audiences (over age 16) are invited for "Parent-Teacher Conferences" also known as "adult night at the Bee". These performances are peppered with sexual references and profanity inspired by R-rated ad-libs made during rehearsals.

The Broadway cast album was released on May 31, 2005, and is available from Ghostlight Records, an imprint of Sh-K-Boom Records. The original Broadway cast recording was nominated for a Grammy Award. In April 2021, a Disney film adaptation was announced to be in the works.

== Background and original productions ==
The musical was based upon C-R-E-P-U-S-C-U-L-E, an original improvisational play created by Rebecca Feldman and performed by The Farm, a New-York-based improvisational comedy troupe. Sarah Saltzberg, Wendy Wasserstein's weekend nanny, was in the original production, and Wasserstein recommended that Finn see the show. Finn brought Rachel Sheinkin on board, and they worked together with Feldman to transform C-R-E-P-U-S-C-U-L-E into a scripted full-length musical.

Spelling Bee was workshopped and developed at the Barrington Stage Company (BSC), Massachusetts, where Julianne Boyd is the Artistic Director, in two different stages. In February 2004, a workshop was done in which a first act and parts of a second act were created – this stage of the process was directed by Michael Barakiva and Feldman. The script was fleshed out, and the show received its world premiere on July 15, 2004, at the Consolati Performing Arts Center in Sheffield, in a fuller production directed by Feldman and Michael Unger. Dan Knechtges choreographed the workshop, summer productions, and the Broadway production. Dana Harrel produced both productions as the Producer of Stage II at BSC. Several cast members, Dan Fogler (later replaced by Josh Gad when Fogler moved on to TV and movies), Jay Reiss, and Sarah Saltzberg remained from C-R-E-P-U-S-C-U-L-E. Robb Sapp (later replaced by Jose Llana when Sapp moved on to Wicked), Dashiell Eaves (replaced by Derrick Baskin), Jesse Tyler Ferguson, Celia Keenan-Bolger (joined as Olive Ostrovsky in the summer), Lisa Howard, and Deborah S. Craig were added to the cast, and a full script was created.

The musical opened off-Broadway at the Second Stage Theatre on January 11, 2005, in previews, officially on February 7, 2005, and closed on March 20, 2005. The production won several awards, among them the 2005 Lucille Lortel Awards, Outstanding Musical and 2005 Drama Desk Awards, Outstanding Ensemble Performance.

Spelling Bee began previews on Broadway at the Circle in the Square Theatre on April 15, 2005, officially opening May 2, and closed on January 20, 2008, after 1,136 performances and 21 previews. The director was James Lapine and the choreographer was Dan Knechtges. The show won Tony Awards for Best Book (Rachel Sheinkin) and Best Featured Actor (Dan Fogler).

=== Subsequent productions ===
The first production outside the United States was at the Melbourne Theatre Company in Melbourne, Australia, from January 18, 2006, to February 25 at the Playhouse, Arts Centre Melbourne. It starred Marina Prior as Ms. Peretti, David Campbell as Chip, and Magda Szubanski as Barfée. The production, which won the 2006 Helpmann Award for Best Musical, was then presented by the Sydney Theatre Company at the Sydney Theatre in 2007. It again starred Prior and Szubanski, now joined by Lisa McCune as Olive. The Sydney season opened on June 11, 2007, and closed in August 2007.

The musical was produced in San Francisco, California, at the Post Street Theatre opening on March 1, 2006, and closing on September 3, 2006. In Chicago the run began on April 11, 2006, at the Drury Lane Theatre, Water Tower Place, closing on March 25, 2007. The production was directed by James Lapine. In Boston it opened at the Wilbur Theatre on September 26, 2006, and closed December 31, 2006. The majority of the San Francisco cast moved to the Boston production.

The Equity U.S. National Tour began in Baltimore, Maryland at the Hippodrome Theatre on September 19, 2006, going through May 2007, visiting over 30 cities across the U.S. From May 24 to June 17, 2007, the original Broadway cast reunited for a limited four-week run at the Wadsworth Theater in Los Angeles. The musical returned to Barrington Stage Company, where it originated, in 2008, and ran from June 11 to July 12, 2008. The production included several cast members from the touring company and was a co-production with North Shore Theatre. The first performance in-the-round was at the North Shore Music Theatre in Beverly, Massachusetts from August 12–31, 2008.

In 2007, the first translated production opened in Seoul, South Korea, with all of the music and dialogue in Korean, but the words were spelled in English. In September 2008, a German-language adaptation premiered as Der 25 Pattenser Buchstabierwettbewerb.

The 2008–2009 Non-Equity U.S. National Tour premiered on October 11, 2008, at the Union Colony Civic Center in Greeley, Colorado, with an official opening in Fort Collins, Colorado on October 14.

The Mason Street Warehouse, Saugatuck Center for the Arts, Saugatuck, Michigan, opened on August 14 and ran through August 31, 2009, directed by Kurt Stamm.

The musical made its UK premiere at the Donmar Warehouse, London, beginning previews on February 11, 2011. It officially opened on February 21, and closed on April 2. The director was Jamie Lloyd.

Spelling Bee made its Scandinavian debut in September 2012 in Oslo, Norway.

The original Broadway cast of Spelling Bee reunited for a one-night only 10th anniversary concert at The Town Hall on July 6, 2015. All actors reprised their roles for the performance with the exception of Celia Keenan-Bolger as Olive Ostrovsky, with Jenni Barber who had previously played the role on Broadway stepping into the role: Keenan-Bolger joined the cast for the concert's finale, performing Olive's monologue as she had a decade prior. The concert was organized in tribute to original production stage manager Andrea "Spook" Testani-Gordon, who died from cancer the previous November.

In 2024, The Sandbox Collective, a Manila-based theater company, staged Spelling Bee in the Philippines from February 24 to March 17. It was directed by Filipino theater veteran Missy Maramara and produced in collaboration with ABS-CBN, Star Magic, and Teatro Kapamilya. The Philippine staging of the musical received highly favorable reviews. Gabriel Bohol of Tatler Asia lauded the production's "impeccable" cast, describing them as "nothing short of perfect".

A 20th anniversary Off-Broadway revival of Spelling Bee opened at New World Stages on November 17, 2025, after previews beginning on November 7. Directed by Danny Mefford, the production used most of the creative team and some of the cast of a previous production that played at the John F. Kennedy Center for the Performing Arts in Washington, D.C. the previous year. The production is scheduled to play a limited 14-week run.

== Synopsis ==
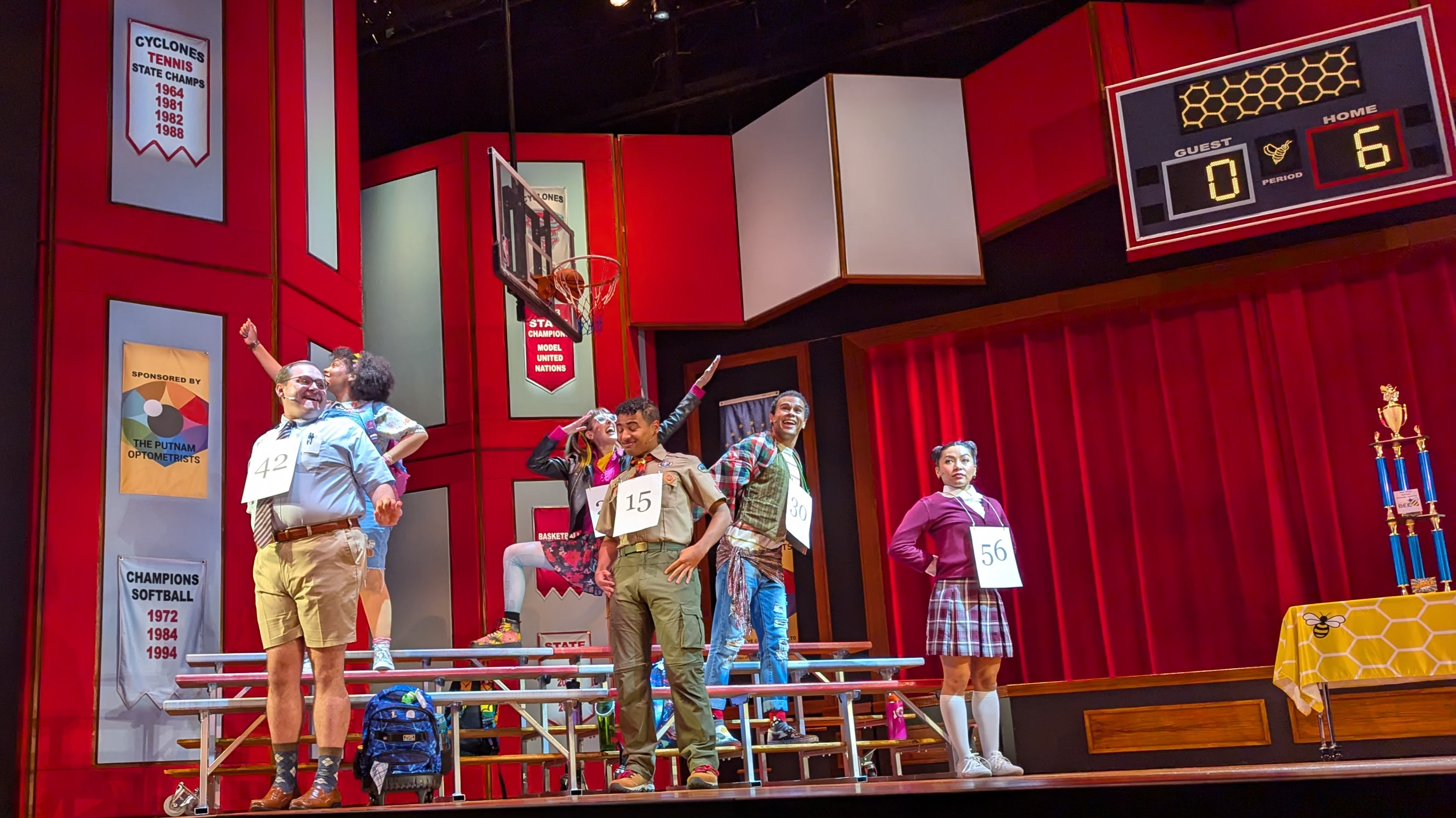
Act 1, during a performance by Indiana Repertory Theatre

=== Act 1 ===
While setting up for the spelling bee, moderator Rona Lisa Peretti has a flashback to when she won the Third Annual Spelling Bee, but is interrupted by the entrance of Chip Tolentino. The spellers are introduced as they enter, and they sing about their anticipation of the bee ("The Twenty-Fifth Annual Putnam County Spelling Bee"). Rona calls up four audience participants and requests to speak privately to Olive Ostrovsky, who has not yet paid the entrance fee. After Olive reveals that her parents are not present and she arrived by bus, Rona decides to let the fee slide for the moment. She then introduces the official word pronouncer, Douglas Panch, and comfort counselor, Mitch Mahoney. Mitch leads the spellers in the Pledge of Allegiance with everyone speaking at different speeds. While Panch explains the rules, Rona gushes over what she loves about the bee ("The Spelling Rules / My Favorite Moment of the Bee 1").

The spelling bee begins. Each time a speller is called, Rona shares a piece of information about them. When Leaf Coneybear is first called up, he has a flashback that reveals he came in third in his local spelling bee and only qualified for the county bee because the winner and first runner up couldn't make it. His word is capybara, which he ends up spelling correctly while in a trance. Olive is shown to be shy and reserved, a result of her largely absent parents. She has come to love spelling by reading the dictionary in her home ("My Friend, the Dictionary"). When William Barfée is called to spell for the first time, Rona describes his unusual technique – he spells the word out on the ground with his foot to get a visual before speaking it. After the audience spellers get easy words (except for the unlucky one who gets epicalyx), the cast spellers rant about how the element of luck makes the bee unfair ("Pandemonium"). Logainne then gets cystitis, and is shown studying with her two often-arguing fathers in a flashback. When Leaf is called the second time, he reminisces about how his family calls him "dumb" ("I'm Not That Smart").

Barfée is called, and sings about his technique ("Magic Foot"). When Marcy is called for the second time, she correctly spells qaimaqam, proving herself to be the best speller, though she is somewhat hurt when Rona claims that she is "all business". Chip is called next, but he is reluctant to take his turn because he has an erection after fantasizing about Leaf's sister, Marigold, who is sitting in the front row of the audience. Under threat of disqualification (a fact not helped because he is asked to spell tittup), he misspells his word (T-I-T-U-P) and Mitch hauls him off ("Pandemonium (Reprise) / My Favorite Moment of the Bee 2").

At this point, the last audience speller is eliminated. Mitch sings a special serenade to this audience member for making it this far ("Prayer of the Comfort Counselor").

=== Act 2 ===
Panch calls a snack break, and Chip passes through the audience selling snacks. He explains to the audience why he lost ("My Unfortunate Erection (Chip's Lament)"). Barfée taunts Chip, who throws a bag of peanut M&M's at him. Barfée is allergic to peanuts, so Olive picks them up for him. Olive and Barfée converse before the second half of the bee begins, with the line from Olive "Did you know that if you switch the first two vowels of Olive, it becomes I love?" Barfée responds with "Well, did you know if you switch the first two vowels of William you get... William?" Olive finishes with "But if you switch the next two, you get Will Aim?" and Barfée begins to develop a crush on Olive.

Logainne describes her two overbearing fathers and the stress that they put on her ("Woe Is Me"). In a montage sequence, the bee is shown progressing through many rounds, ending with Leaf's elimination. He walks away with his head held high, having proven to himself that he is smarter than his family gave him credit for ("I'm Not that Smart (Reprise)").

Marcy reveals more about her stressful life ("I Speak Six Languages"). She is given the word camouflage, to which she sighs, "Dear Jesus, can't you come up with a harder word than that?" Jesus then appears to her and teaches her that she is in control of her own life. Resolved to do what she wants rather than what is expected of her, she intentionally misspells the word (camouflajzh) and exits excitedly ("Jesus / Pandemonium (Reprise #2)").

Olive gets a call from her father, who she has been hoping would arrive. Panch attempts to disallow her from answering the phone, but she persuades Rona to take the call for her, leading her to learn that her father will miss the bee due to working longer than expected. Logainne then begins an ad-libbed rant about the bee, her fathers, and current political events. Panch lashes out at Logainne for asking for alternate definitions of a word more than 3 times, and is escorted offstage by Rona and Mitch. One of Logainne's fathers jumps onstage to calm Logainne down and pours some of his soda on the floor to make Barfée's foot stick and thus disrupt his technique.

With Panch calmed down, Olive is called to spell. She imagines her parents being there and giving her the love that she always has wanted and yearned for ("The I Love You Song"). Barfée is called to spell next, and spells his word correctly despite the soda causing his foot to stick. Logainne misspells her next word by over complicating it (vug → V-U-G-G-H-E) ("Woe Is Me (Reprise)") and Rona is excited that it has come down to the final two ("My Favorite Moment of the Bee 3").

The finals are shown through another montage ("Second"), and Olive and Barfée continue to grow closer. Eventually, Olive misspells a word, giving Barfée a chance to win. He is torn between winning and letting Olive win, but with Olive's encouragement, he spells his word correctly. Panch awards Barfée the large trophy and two hundred dollar prize, and, in a surprise act of charity, pays Olive's entrance fee, calling it a "runner-up prize." Olive congratulates Barfée, and each character reads a sentence or two about what they do in the years and decades after the main action of the musical ends ("Finale").

== Musical numbers ==
(Songs are not listed in the Playbill since, with audience members on stage, the timing of the "Goodbye" songs varies with each show and because it could spoil who wins the bee.)

- "The Twenty-Fifth Annual Putnam County Spelling Bee" – Chip, Rona, Leaf, Logainne, Barfée, Marcy, Olive
- "The Spelling Rules" ‡ – Panch, Spellers, Rona, Mitch
- "My Favorite Moment of the Bee" ‡ – Rona
- "My Friend, the Dictionary" – Olive, Chip, Leaf, Logainne, Rona, Company
- "The First Goodbye" – Company
- "Pandemonium" – Chip, Olive, Logainne, Leaf, Barfée, Marcy, Mitch
- "I'm Not That Smart" – Leaf
- "The Second Goodbye" – Company
- "Magic Foot" – Barfée, Company
- "Pandemonium (Reprise)" ‡ – Mitch, Company
- "My Favorite Moment of the Bee (Reprise)" ‡ – Rona
- "Prayer of the Comfort Counselor" – Mitch, Company
- "My Unfortunate Erection/Distraction (Chip's Lament)" – Chip
- "Woe Is Me" – Logainne, Carl, Dan, and Company
- "Spelling Montage" † – Panch, Spellers
- "I'm Not That Smart (Reprise)" – Leaf
- "I Speak Six Languages" – Marcy, Females
- "Jesus" † – Marcy, Females
- "The I Love You Song" – Olive, Olive's Mom, Olive's Dad
- "Woe is Me (Reprise)" – Logainne, Mitch
- "My Favorite Moment of the Bee (Reprise 2)" ‡ – Rona
- "Second" ‡ – Barfée, Olive, Company
  - "Second (Part 1)" – Barfée, Olive, Company
  - "Weltanschauung" – Barfée, Company
  - "Barfée and Olive Pas de Deux" – Company
  - "Second (Part 2)" – Barfée, Olive, Company
  - "The Champion" – Rona, Company
- "Finale" – Company
- "The Last Goodbye" – Company

‡ Combined into one track on the cast album

† Not included on the cast album

There is a song on the cast album, called "Why We Like Spelling". This song is sung by all the spellers, but is not in the Broadway production or in the licensed productions.

A song entitled "The 25th Annual Putnam County Spelling Bee Massacres the 12 Days of Christmas" was released online as a holiday track sung by the cast. It reveals several different instances of events within the lives of the characters, such as Coneybear being given 2 right socks named "Phil", Olive discussing various places her dad forgets her at, Barfée ruling his sea anemone circus from his basement, Panch's urine laced with Ritalin, Rona's most recent boyfriend breaking up with her, Mitch ending up in and making calls from prison, Logainne explaining her dads giving her stomach ulcers, Chip playing with his little league baseball team, and Marcy receiving the 7th book of Moses (which Logainne repeatedly objects to, claiming there's only 5) while fighting with her understudy who was taking her place because "Deborah [S. Craig, the regular Marcy actress] hurt her knee".

== Characters ==
=== Major characters ===
- Rona Lisa Peretti: The number-one realtor in Putnam County and returning moderator. She is a sweet woman who loves children, but she can be very stern when it comes to dealing with Vice Principal Panch, who has feelings for her that she most likely does not return. It is implied that she sees much of herself in Olive Ostrovsky. Her favorite moment of the Bee is told by Rona several times, but her true favorite moment is when the last spellers go head to head for the top spot because it is so suspenseful and filled with hope. Ms. Peretti herself won the Third Annual Putnam County Spelling Bee by spelling "syzygy", which she recounts at the very beginning of the opening number.
- Vice Principal Douglas Panch: After five years' absence from the Bee, Panch returns as the word pronouncer. There was an "incident" at the Twentieth Annual Bee, but he claims to be in "a better place" now (or so we think), thanks to a high-fiber diet and Jungian analysis (or in the 2025 Off-Broadway Production, micro dosing Ketamine). He is infatuated with Rona Lisa Peretti, but she does not return his affections. For 2 years after the bee, he stalks Rona, resulting in a restraining order.
- Mitch Mahoney: The Official Comfort Counselor. An ex-convict, Mitch is performing his community service with the Bee, and hands out juice boxes to losing students. After the bee, he decides to make his community service life-long, comforting eliminated spellers, and often keeping in touch with them in the future. In the 2025 Off-Broadway production, Mitch is a former personal trainer whose gym shut down during the COVID-19 pandemic and resulted in his girlfriend leaving him and eventually finds his calling as a grief counselor after the bee and still keeps in touch with the kids in the bee.
- Olive Ostrovsky: A young newcomer to competitive spelling. Her mother is enjoying a 9 month stay in an ashram in India, and her (possibly abusive) father is working late, as usual, but he is trying to come sometime during the bee. She made friends with her dictionary at a very young age, helping her to make it to the competition. She longs to be loved by her parents, but they do not provide her the attention she needs.
- William Morris Barfée: A Putnam County Spelling Bee finalist last year, he was eliminated because of an allergic reaction to peanuts. His famous "Magic Foot" method of spelling has boosted him to spelling glory. He has one working nostril and a touchy personality. He has an often-mispronounced last name: it is Bar-FAY, not BARF-ee ("there's an accent aigu", he explains with some hostility). He develops a crush on Olive during the second half of the show. In the end he wins the spelling bee, correctly spelling “weltanschauung”. He wondered if he should throw the bee so that Olive can win it instead.
- Logainne "Schwartzy" SchwartzandGrubenierre: Logainne is the youngest and most politically aware speller, often making comments about current political figures, with two overbearing gay fathers pushing her to win at any cost as they might disown her if she doesn't win. She is somewhat of a neat freak, speaks with a lisp, and knows she will return to the bee next year. Logainne has progressive views.
- Marcy Park: A recent transfer from Virginia, Marcy placed ninth in last year's nationals. She is fluent in six languages (though with less-than-stellar pronunciation): French, Spanish, Japanese, Russian, Hebrew, and German. She is a member of an all-American hockey team, a championship rugby player, plays Chopin and Mozart on multiple instruments, and several other impressive skills. But, she also sleeps only three hours a night, hides in the bathroom cabinet, is not allowed to cry, and is getting very tired of always winning. She is a total over-achiever, and attends a Catholic school. When she lost, it was because she didn't want to win (knowing Jesus would still love her) and threw the bee on purpose.
- Leaf Coneybear: A homeschooler and the second runner-up in his district, Leaf gets into the competition on a lark: the winner and first runner-up had to go to the winner's Bat Mitzvah. Leaf comes from a large family of former hippies and makes his own clothes. He spells words correctly while in a trance. In his song, "I'm Not That Smart", he sings that his family thinks he is "not that smart", but he insinuates that he is merely easily distracted. Most of the words that he is assigned are South American rodents with amusing names. Leaf has severe ADD (now referred to as ADHD), which is implied to be the reason of his family believing he isn't smart.
- Charlito "Chip" Tolentino ("Tripp Barrington" in the original workshop, "Isaac 'Chip' Berkowitz" in the Chicago production): A Boy Scout and champion of the Twenty-Fourth Annual Putnam County Spelling Bee, he returns to defend his title. Relatively social and athletic, as he plays little league, Chip expects things to come easily but finds puberty hitting at an inopportune moment. This "inopportune moment" could be called Marigold Coneybear, who happens to be one of Leaf Coneybear's sisters.
- Three or four spellers from the audience: Audience members are encouraged to sign up to participate before the show, and several are chosen to spell words on stage. In touring productions, local celebrities are sometimes selected.

=== Minor characters ===
(All can be doubled by the actors playing the major characters.)

- Carl Grubenierre: One of Logainne's fathers; he has set his heart on his little girl winning the Bee, no matter what he has to do, including sabotaging William's foot. Usually played by the actor who plays Leaf.
- Dan Schwartz: Logainne's other father; he is more laid back and content than Carl, but is still intent on his daughter winning the Bee. Usually played by the actor who plays Mitch.
- Mr. Coneybear: Doubtful and finds his son annoying and unintelligent. Usually played by the actor who plays Barfée.
- Mrs Coneybear: Overprotective and doubtful of her son's abilities to stand up to the competition. Usually played by the actor who plays Logainne.
- The Coneybear Siblings: Not very confident of Leaf's abilities, to say the least. They often ridicule him for having lower intelligence compared to everyone else in the family. Usually played by the remaining spellers (both cast and the volunteer audience spellers).
- Marigold Coneybear: An unseen member of the Coneybear Siblings, who Chip is attracted to causing him at an inopportune moment to erect and ejaculate in his pants, resulting in him being eliminated. During “Chip’s Lament” In the off broadway version of the show, Chip eludes to his cum incident by squirting juice boxes on the audience at least five times near the end of the number.
- Olive's Mom and Dad: Olive's mom is in India, Olive's dad is working late, but they appear in Olive's imagination to encourage her and tell her they love her. Sadly, their love is merely an imagination. Usually played by the actors who play Miss Peretti and Mitch.
- Jesus Christ: Appears humorously to Marcy in a moment of crisis. Usually played by the actor who plays Chip.

== Casting history ==
The principal casts of notable productions of The Twenty-Fifth Annual Putnam County Spelling Bee

Role	BSC Workshops 2004	Off-Broadway & Broadway 2005	Melbourne 2006	National Tour 2006	San Francisco 2006	London 2011	Washington, DC 2024	Off-Broadway Revival 2025
Rona Lisa Peretti	Lisa Howard	Lisa Howard	Marina Prior	Jennifer Simard	Betsy Wolfe	Katherine Kingsley	Bonnie Milligan	Lilli Cooper
Douglas Panch	Jay Reiss	Jay Reiss	Tyler Coppin	James Kall	Jim Cashman	Steve Pemberton	Taran Killam	Jason Kravits
Mitch Mahoney	Dashiell Eaves; Derrick Baskin	Derrick Baskin	Bert Labonte	Alan H. Green	James Monroe Iglehart	Ako Mitchell	Alex Joseph Grayson	Matt Manuel
Olive Ostrovsky	Rebecca Feldman; Celia Keenan-Bolger	Celia Keenan-Bolger	Natalie O'Donnell	Lauren Worsham	Jenni Barber	Hayley Gallivan	Nina White	Jasmine Amy Rogers
William Barfée	Dan Fogler	Dan Fogler	Magda Szubanski	Eric Petersen	Jared Gertner	David Fynn	Kevin McHale	Kevin McHale
Logainne SchwartzandGrubenierre	Sarah Saltzberg	Sarah Saltzberg	Christen O'Leary	Sarah Stiles	Sara Inbar	Iris Roberts	Beanie Feldstein	Autumn Best
Marcy Park	Deborah S. Craig as Gramercy Park	Deborah S. Craig	Natalie Mendoza	Katie Boren	Greta Lee	Maria Lawson	Leana Rae Concepcion	Leana Rae Concepcion
Leaf Coneybear	Jesse Tyler Ferguson	Jesse Tyler Ferguson	Tim Wright	Michael Zahler	Stanley Bahorek	Chris Carswell	Noah Galvin	Justin Cooley
Chip Tolentino	Robb Sapp as Tripp Barrington	Jose Llana	David Campbell	Miguel Cervantes	Aaron J. Albano	Harry Hepple	Philippe Arroyo	Philippe Arroyo

Notable replacements

Broadway

- Rona: Jennifer Simard
- Leaf: Barrett Foa, Rory O'Malley, Stanley Bahorek
- Barfée: Josh Gad
- Marcy: Greta Lee
- Mitch: James Monroe Iglehart
- Panch: Mo Rocca, Darrell Hammond

Off-Broadway Revival

- Rona: Ali Stroker, Alex Newell
- Panch: Jon Cryer
- Logainne: Laura Marano, Laurie Hernandez
- Olive: Nina White

== Audience interaction and words used ==
=== Audience interaction ===
About half an hour before the show begins, audience members in the lobby are given the chance to sign up to participate in the show as spellers. The registration form asks for name, occupation, hobbies, description of clothing, spelling ability, and age range. Interviewers look for people with no acting experience, unique names, traits, and backgrounds. The audience participants are taken backstage prior to the show and are shown where to stand when called from the audience and given instruction about what to do when called upon to spell. They are asked to request a definition of each word and its usage in a sentence, and to attempt to spell each word rather than giving up. The final audience member to be eliminated is usually given an exceptionally difficult word they are sure to miss; regardless of the spelling the cast reacts with incredulity at their "success," and the next word is "belled" as incorrect before the attempt is completed. During the performance, the actors sitting next to the audience participants periodically whisper hints about when to stand, sit, move in slow motion, freeze or hang on because the seating platform unit is about to spin.

Ms. Peretti calls the spellers to the stage at the beginning of the show, and they are given badges to wear that say "Finalist." As the show proceeds, each one is eliminated with successively more difficult words. The final audience participant to be eliminated is serenaded by Mitch ("Prayer of the Comfort Counselor") on-stage. Mitch also gives each eliminated finalist (both audience members and regular characters) a juice box and a hug.

Katharine Close, the 2006 winner of the Scripps National Spelling Bee, was invited to be a contestant at a performance of the show. She was the last speller from the audience to be eliminated and survived fourteen rounds.

The musical treats the audience members as if they were the audience at the fictitious spelling bee. For example, the characters single out audience members as their family members. For example, Barfée periodically refers to an age-appropriate woman near the stage as "mom." Similarly, Chip is distracted by an attractive audience member, contributing to a misspelling. He is the first contestant eliminated and is thus forced to sell snacks in the audience in the manner of the refreshment hawkers at a sports event. Other characters frequently walk through the auditorium among the audience during the show, sometimes integrating the audience into the show and occasionally dropping the "fourth wall".

=== Words used ===
Examples of words spelled by characters in performances of Spelling Bee include astrobleme, cat, dinosaur, hasenpfeffer, origami (Adult Show), and weltanschauung. Words spelled by the audience volunteers are often unscripted and sometimes improvised by the cast to gently poke fun at the volunteer speller. Past examples include dystopia, cenacle, elephant, hemidemisemiquaver, homunculus, cow, jihad, lysergic acid diethylamide, castoreum and didgeridoo spelt by Rolf Harris. Julie Andrews missed "supercalifragilisticexpialidocious" when she was a guest speller on KIDS night on Broadway, 2007.

== Critical response ==
Charles Isherwood, in his review of the Broadway production for The New York Times, wrote "Most crucially, the affectionate performances of the six actors burdened with the daunting challenge of inhabiting young souls have not been stretched into grotesque shape by the move to a large theater... William Finn's score sounds plumper and more rewarding than it did Off Broadway. If it occasionally suggests a Saturday morning television cartoon set to music by Stephen Sondheim, that's not inappropriate. And Mr. Finn's more wistful songs provide a nice sprinkling of sugar to complement the sass in Rachel Sheinkin's zinger-filled book... Mr. Lapine has sharpened all the musical's elements without betraying its appealing modesty." (NY Times Critics Pick).

== Later adaptations ==
In April 2021, Walt Disney Pictures announced plans to develop a film adaptation of the musical, to be produced by Dan Lin and Jonathan Eirich through their Rideback banner, with Ryan Halprin as executive producer.

On January 25, 2023, the school board for Cardinal Local School District in Ohio halted a student production of the musical on the grounds that it was "vulgar." The Cardinal School District denied their decision was made because the musical depicts two gay characters, and confirmed that a "revised" version of the play would proceed as planned.

== Awards and nominations ==
=== Original off-Broadway production ===
Year	Award Ceremony	Category	Nominee	Result
2005	Drama Desk Award	Outstanding Book of a Musical	Rachel Sheinkin	Won
2005	Drama Desk Award	Outstanding Ensemble Performance		Won
2005	Drama Desk Award	Outstanding Director of a Musical	James Lapine	Won
2005	Lucille Lortel Award	Outstanding Musical		Won
2005	Lucille Lortel Award	Outstanding Featured Actor	Dan Fogler	Won
2005	Lucille Lortel Award	Outstanding Director	James Lapine	Nominated
2005	Lucille Lortel Award	Outstanding Choreographer	Dan Knechtges	Nominated
2005	Theatre World Award		Dan Fogler	Won
2005	Theatre World Award		Celia Keenan-Bolger	Won

=== Original Broadway production ===
Year	Award Ceremony	Category	Nominee	Result
2005	Drama Desk Award	Outstanding Musical		Nominated
2005	Drama Desk Award	Outstanding Lyrics	William Finn	Nominated
2005	Drama Desk Award	Outstanding Music	William Finn	Nominated
2005	Tony Award	Best Musical		Nominated
2005	Tony Award	Best Book of a Musical	Rachel Sheinkin	Won
2005	Tony Award	Best Original Score	William Finn	Nominated
2005	Tony Award	Best Performance by a Featured Actor in a Musical	Dan Fogler	Won
2005	Tony Award	Best Performance by a Featured Actress in a Musical	Celia Keenan-Bolger	Nominated
2005	Tony Award	Best Direction of a Musical	James Lapine	Nominated
2006	Grammy Award	Best Musical Theater Album		Nominated

=== 2025 Off-Broadway revival ===
Year	Award	Category	Work	Result	Ref.
2026	Drama League Awards	Outstanding Revival of a Musical		Nominated	
2026	Drama League Awards	Outstanding Direction of a Musical	Danny Mefford	Nominated	
2026	Drama League Awards	Distinguished Performance	Justin Cooley	Nominated	
2026	Drama League Awards	Distinguished Performance	Jasmine Amy Rogers	Nominated	
2026	Outer Critics Circle Award	Outstanding Revival of a Musical		Nominated	
2026	Outer Critics Circle Award	Outstanding Featured Performer in an Off-Broadway Musical	Justin Cooley	Nominated	
2026	Outer Critics Circle Award	Outstanding Featured Performer in an Off-Broadway Musical	Kevin McHale	Nominated	
2026	Outer Critics Circle Award	Outstanding Featured Performer in an Off-Broadway Musical	Jasmine Amy Rogers	Nominated	
2026	Drama Desk Awards	Outstanding Revival of a Musical		Nominated	
2026	Drama Desk Awards	Outstanding Featured Performance in a Musical	Lilli Cooper	Nominated	
2026	Drama Desk Awards	Outstanding Featured Performance in a Musical	Jasmine Amy Rogers	Nominated	
2026	Lucille Lortel Award	Outstanding Revival		Won	
2026	Lucille Lortel Award	Outstanding Ensemble	Philippe Arroyo, Autumn Best, Leana Rae Concepcion, Justin Cooley, Lilli Cooper, Jason Kravits, Matt Manuel, Kevin McHale, Jasmine Amy Rogers	Nominated	
2026	Dorian Award	Outstanding Off-Broadway Revival		Won	
2026	Dorian Award	Outstanding Featured Performance in an Off-Broadway Production	Jasmine Amy Rogers	Nominated	
2026	Dorian Award	Outstanding Featured Performance in an Off-Broadway Production	Justin Cooley	Nominated	
