= Betsy Wolfe =

American actress and singer (born 1982)

- Wolfe in 2026
- Born: Elizabeth Marie Wolfe; June 1, 1982 (age 44); Visalia, California, U.S.
- Education: University of Cincinnati (BFA)
- Occupations: Actress, singer, entrepreneur
- Years active: 2005–present
- Spouse: Adam Krauthamer (m. 2017)
- Children: 1
- Website: www.betsywolfe.com

Betsy Wolfe (born Elizabeth Marie Wolfe; June 1, 1982) is an American actress, singer, and entrepreneur.

Wolfe starred in the Broadway musical & Juliet as Anne Hathaway, a performance for which she was nominated for the 2023 Tony Award for Best Featured Actress in a Musical. Her previous Broadway credits include: 110 in the Shade (2007), Everyday Rapture (2009-2010), Rosa Bud in The Mystery of Edwin Drood (2012–13), Ellen in Bullets Over Broadway (2014), Cordelia in Falsettos (2016–17), and Jenna Hunterson in Waitress (2017–18). She also starred as Cathy Hiatt in the 2013 off-Broadway revival of The Last Five Years. She replaced Megan Hilty in the Broadway production of Death Becomes Her as Madeline Ashton.

In 2020, Wolfe starred in the holiday film Estella Scrooge: A Christmas Carol With A Twist. She can be seen in the indie feature First One In, and had a guest starring role on the CBS series Instinct.

Wolfe co-founded BroadwayEvolved, a musical theatre training program for students.

== Early life and education ==
Wolfe grew up in Visalia, California. She attended Golden West High School and graduated in 2000. She graduated from the University of Cincinnati – College-Conservatory of Music in 2004.

== Career ==
Wolfe played Evelyn Nesbit in the Paper Mill Playhouse production of Ragtime in 2005.

Wolfe starred as Cathy in the Off-Broadway revival of The Last Five Years, which ran at the Second Stage Theater from March 7, 2013 (previews), to May 18, 2013. Charles Isherwood, in his review in The New York Times, wrote that Wolfe has "a bright, strong soprano with a keen belt. With her wholesome blond beauty she is well cast."

In 2014 she appeared on Broadway in Woody Allen's musical Bullets Over Broadway as Ellen. The CurtainUp reviewer wrote: "Betsy Wolfe also has little to do as David's girlfriend Ellen but, like Ziemba, when she does get to sing it's lovely."

She appeared in Up Here, a new musical written by Robert Lopez and Kristen Anderson-Lopez, at the La Jolla Playhouse in July 2015. The Variety reviewer noted that Wolfe "is charming in her role and even sings the hell out of such banalities as 'I feel like I've always known you.'"

In May 2016, Wolfe played Elsa in the lab production of Disney's Frozen.

She appeared in a reading of a new musical titled Flying Over Sunset by James Lapine (book and director), Tom Kitt (score) and Michael Korie (lyrics). The reading took place at the Vineyard Arts Project in Edgartown, Massachusetts, on July 29, 2016, with additional cast members Marin Mazzie and Boyd Gaines.

Wolfe played Cordelia in the Broadway revival of Falsettos, which ran from September 29, 2016 (previews), to January 8, 2017. She joined the cast of Waitress on Broadway on June 13, 2017, in the role of Jenna. Wolfe left the role on January 9, 2018.

In February 2018, Wolfe and Cynthia Rose announced that they would be founding a company, BroadwayEvolved, to give workshops and masterclasses to young actors.

In June 2018, she played Rosemary Pilkington for a limited engagement of How to Succeed in Business Without Really Trying at the Kennedy Center in Washington, D.C., alongside Michael Urie, John Bolton, John Michael Higgins and Skylar Astin.

In 2020, Wolfe appeared as Bonnie in the musical podcast Propaganda!

She starred as Anne Hathaway in the new Broadway musical & Juliet at the Stephen Sondheim Theatre. Wolfe played her final performance as Anne on October 20, 2024.

On January 16, 2026, she joined the cast of Death Becomes Her as Madeline Ashton on Broadway at the Lunt-Fontanne Theatre. She's set to remain in the role until its closure on June 28. In July 2026, she’s set to join the Off-Broadway revival cast of Little Shop of Horrors as Audrey opposite Ethan Slater as Seymour.

=== Opera and concerts ===
Wolfe appeared with the Cincinnati Pops Orchestra, directed by Erich Kunzel, at Carnegie Hall on April 1, 2003. In 2016 and 2017, Wolfe appeared with Darren Criss and Adam Kantor, respectively, in The New York Pops' concerts "Best of Broadway" and "Women of Notes: In Dedication to Female Composers and Lyricists" at Carnegie Hall, with appearances by Robert Lopez, Kristen Anderson-Lopez, and Jason Robert Brown, and by Sara Bareilles, Ingrid Michaelson, Georgia Stitt, and Shaina Taub, respectively. She also frequently performs the music of newer musical theatre writers in concert, including Ryan Scott Oliver and Zack Zadek.

Wolfe appeared in the Metropolitan Opera production of Die Fledermaus as Ida, with a new book by Douglas Carter Beane. The opera, which also starred Paulo Szot as Dr. Falke and Danny Burstein as Frosch, opened on December 31, 2013. In November 2017 Wolfe performed at the Houston symphony with Jeremy Jordan.

== Personal life ==
Wolfe began dating Adam Krauthamer, a French horn player, in June 2014. They met while working on Bullets Over Broadway. The pair married on December 17, 2017. In 2020, she welcomed a daughter, Poppy.

== Theater credits ==
| Year | Production | Role | Location | Category |
|---|---|---|---|---|
| 2005 | Ragtime | Evelyn Nesbit | Paper Mill Playhouse | Regional |
| 2005 | A Wonderful Life | Ensemble | Shubert Theatre | Actors Fund of America Staged Concert |
| 2006 | The 25th Annual Putnam County Spelling Bee | Rona Lisa Peretti | San Francisco Playhouse | Regional |
| 2006 | The 25th Annual Putnam County Spelling Bee | Rona Lisa Peretti | Wilbur Theatre | Regional |
| 2007 | Ace | Louise | Old Globe Theatre | Regional |
| 2007 | 110 in the Shade | Katheryn Brawner | Studio 54 | Broadway |
| 2008 | Camelot | Ensemble | Lincoln Center | New York Philharmonic Concert |
| 2009 | Everyday Rapture | Mennonette | Second Stage Theatre | Off-Broadway |
| 2010 | Everyday Rapture | Mennonette | American Airlines Theatre | Broadway |
| 2011 | Tales of the City | Mary Ann Singleton | American Conservatory Theater | Regional |
| 2011 | The Boys from Syracuse | Luciana | Sidney Harman Hall, Washington, DC | Regional |
| 2012 | Merrily We Roll Along | Beth | New York City Center | Encores! Concert Production |
| 2012 | 35mm: A Musical Exhibition | Voice 1 | Galapagos Art Space | Off-Broadway |
| 2012-2013 | The Mystery of Edwin Drood | Rosa Bud/Miss Deirdre Peregrine | Studio 54 | Broadway |
| 2013 | The Last Five Years | Cathy Hiatt | Second Stage Theatre | Off-Broadway |
| 2013 | The Pirates of Penzance | Edith | Delacorte Theatre | Concert |
| 2013 | Red Eye of Love | Selma Chargesse | Waterman's Community Center | Regional |
| 2014 | Bullets Over Broadway | Ellen | St. James Theatre | Broadway |
| 2015 | The Music Man | Marian Paroo | Cincinnati Music Hall | Concert |
| 2015 | Up Here | Lindsay | La Jolla Playhouse | Regional |
| 2015 | The Pirates of Penzance | Edith | New York City Center | Off-Broadway |
| 2016 | Frozen | Elsa | New 42 Studios | Lab |
| 2016 | Flying Over Sunset | Betsy Drake | Vineyard Arts Project | Staged Reading |
| 2016-2017 | Falsettos | Cordelia | Walter Kerr Theatre | Broadway |
| 2017 | The Last Five Years | Cathy Hiatt | Colony Theatre | Concert |
| 2017–2018 | Waitress | Jenna Hunterson | Brooks Atkinson Theatre | Broadway |
| 2018 | How to Succeed in Business Without Really Trying | Rosemary Pilkington | Kennedy Center | Regional |
| 2019 | High Button Shoes | Sara Longstreet | New York City Center | Encores! Concert Production |
| 2022 | & Juliet | Anne Hathaway / April | Princess of Wales Theatre | Toronto - North American Premiere |
| 2022-2024 | & Juliet | Anne Hathaway / April | Stephen Sondheim Theatre | Broadway |
| 2025 | Joy | Joy Mangano | Laura Pels Theatre | Off-Broadway |
| 2026 | Death Becomes Her | Madeline Ashton | Lunt-Fontanne Theatre | Broadway |
| 2026 | Little Shop of Horrors | Audrey | Westside Theatre | Off-Broadway |
| 2026-2027 | Falsettos | Cordelia | Carnegie Hall | Reunion concert |
| 2027 | Falsettos | Cordelia | London Palladium | West End |

== Filmography ==
=== Film ===
| Year | Film | Role | Notes |
|---|---|---|---|
| 2014 | The Last Five Years | Former Stripper | Uncredited |
| 2020 | First One In | Grace | |
| 2020 | Estella Scrooge: A Christmas Carol With A Twist | Estella Scrooge | |
| 2021 | Tales of the City | Mary Ann Singleton | |

=== Television ===
| Year | Title | Role | Notes |
|---|---|---|---|
| 2008 | Live from Lincoln Center | Ensemble | Episode: "Camelot" |
| 2017 | Live from Lincoln Center | Cordelia | Episode: "Falsettos" |
| 2019 | Instinct | Ella Betts | Episode: "204" |

== Awards and nominations ==
| Year | Award | Category | Work | Result |
|---|---|---|---|---|
| 2023 | Tony Award | Best Featured Actress in a Musical | & Juliet | Nominated |
| 2023 | Drama League Award | Distinguished Performance | & Juliet | Nominated |
| 2023 | Outer Critics Circle Award | Outstanding Featured Performer in a Broadway Musical | & Juliet | Nominated |

== Discography ==
- 2007: 110 in the Shade (2007 New Broadway Cast Recording)
- 2009: Everyday Rapture (Original Cast Recording)
- 2011: Stage Door Canteen: Broadway Responds to WWII (Original Concert Cast Recording)
- 2012: 35mm: A Musical Exhibition (Original Cast Recording)
- 2012: Merrily We Roll Along (2012 New Encores! Cast Recording)
- 2012: The Mystery Of Edwin Drood (2012 New Broadway Cast Recording)
- 2012: "Bustle Fluffah" – single (with Andy Karl and Jessie Mueller)
- 2013: The Last Five Years (2013 New Cast Recording)
- 2013: Crosses: A Musical of Hope (Original Studio Cast Recording)
- 2014: Bullets Over Broadway (Original Broadway Cast Recording)
- 2016: Falsettos (2016 New Broadway Cast Recording)
- 2019: A Never Ending Line (Original Studio Cast Recording)
- 2020: Estella Scrooge (2020 Soundtrack)
- 2021: Some Lovers (2021 Concept Recording)
- 2022: & Juliet (Original Broadway Cast Recording)
