= Robb Sapp =

American actor and singer (born 1978)

Robb Sapp (born June 1, 1978) (sometimes known as Rob Sapp, or Robbie Sapp) is an American actor and singer who has appeared in musicals, both on Broadway and Off-Broadway as well as in regional theatre.

== Early life ==
Sapp grew up in Solon, Ohio. Sapp's father, Robert Sapp and his uncle William Sapp were in the band, Fully Assembled. His mother is involved in an Italian food catering business. Sapp once worked at Sea World of Ohio, dressing as a whale along with Marc Sumerak. He attended Syracuse University. While there he participated in Damn Yankees, Anything Goes and Much Ado About Nothing. After graduating with a Bachelor of Fine Arts, he was approached by Music Theater of Wichita and participated in shows including Singin' in the Rain, Evita and The Pajama Game. Sapp then relocated to New York City.

== Career ==
- Saturday Night Fever, National tour (Bobby C),
- Zanna, Don't!, 2003 & 2014, Off-Broadway (Tank, originated role),
- Johnny Guitar, 2004, Off-Broadway, (Turkey, originated role),
- The 25th Annual Putnam County Spelling Bee, 2004, Barrington Stage Company (Tripp Barrington)
- From 11 October 2005 through 8 August 2006, he starred as Boq in the Broadway production of Wicked, having understudied the role since late 2004.
- A new musical, Happiness Off-Broadway at Lincoln Center Theater's Mitzi E. Newhouse in February 2009.
- Meet Me in St. Louis, 2009, The Muny, St. Louis, (Lon Smith)
- From August–December 2009, he starred as Pinocchio and the Magic Mirror in Shrek the Musical on Broadway replacing John Tartaglia.
- Director of 'The Music Man' for Chagrin Falls High School.

== Other projects ==
- Robb and his friend Jason Weston also run a photography studio named Dirty Sugar.
