= K Allison =

American actress

- Born: Kathryn Allison; New York City, New York
- Education: Morristown–Beard School; Ithaca College (B.F.A.)
- Occupations: Actress, singer

K Allison is a Broadway actor and singer. Allison won the New York Musical Theatre Festival's Next Big Broadway Sensation contest in 2014.

== Early life and education ==
Allison was born in New York City. She graduated from Morristown–Beard School in Morristown, New Jersey, in 2010. Her high school acting career included a performance as Dolly in the musical Hello, Dolly!. K also performed in Lucky Stiff, Dearly Beloved, and Little Women. In her senior year, she won the Douglas Michael Krueger Scholarship awarded by the Paper Mill Playhouse (the state theatre) in Millburn, New Jersey. K then completed her bachelor's degree in musical theatre at Ithaca College in Ithaca, New York.

== Acting career ==
Allison made her Broadway debut in the musical Aladdin at the New Amsterdam Theatre in March 2015, playing an attendant, fortune teller, and ensemble member.

Allison performed in a production of The Rocky Horror Show at Bucks County Playhouse (the state theatre of Pennsylvania) in New Hope, Pennsylvania. She has also starred as Yertle the Turtle inSeussical: The Musical at the Muny in St. Louis, Missouri. In 2014, the New Hampshire Theatre Awards named Allison a finalist for her role as Hattie in a production of Kiss Me, Kate at the New London Barn Playhouse in New London, New Hampshire. In 2015, she performed in a private reading of Darling, Ryan Scott Oliver's retelling of Peter Pan, at Pearl Studios in Manhattan.

On January 27, 2015, Allison performed in "Mr. Davis: A Night with Sammy", an homage to Sammy Davis Jr., at the Metropolitan Baptist Church.

== Recording career ==
On November 28, 2018, Allison released a cover of Mary J. Blige's "Real Love", the first single from her debut album. On February 8, 2019, Allison released her debut album, Something Real, produced by Dominic Fallacaro and featuring guest appearances by Aladdin co-star James Monroe Igleheart.
