= Corey Mach =

Broadway and film actor and producer

Corey Mach (born 1987) is an American stage actor and producer. He is known for his role as "Tyler" in the Original Broadway Revival Cast of Merrily We Roll Along, "Harry" in Kinky Boots on Broadway, and "William Shakespeare" in the First National Broadway Tour of & Juliet. He is also known for Godspell and Hands on a Hardbody on Broadway as well as the National Tours of Wicked, Rent, and Flashdance. He also appeared in the World Premieres of Waitress, Mystic Pizza, From Here to Eternity and Mrs. Miller Does Her Thing, written and directed by James Lapine. He has been seen on TV in supporting roles in "Elsbeth", "Uncoupled", "The Blacklist" and "FBI". He is also the producer and creator of the concert series Broadway Sings.

== Early life and education ==
Mach was born in Strongsville, Ohio. He began acting at an early age, performing extensively at Cleveland-area theaters such as Cleveland Heights' Cain Park and the Cassidy Theatre in Parma Heights. After graduating from Strongsville High School, he was accepted into and attended Baldwin-Wallace College Conservatory of Music, majoring in musical theater. His second year at Baldwin-Wallace was spent with the international tour of the musical Rent.

During those four years at Baldwin-Wallace, he played leading roles in such as "Leo Frank" in Parade, "Anatoly" in Chess, "Pippin" in Pippin, "Harold" in Harold & Maude, "Burrs" in Andrew Lippa's The Wild Party, and "Jamie" in The Last Five Years. He graduated with a musical theatre degree in 2010, concluding with a showcase that led to jump-start his career, and months later joined the First National Tour of Wicked.

== Career ==
During his sophomore year at Baldwin-Wallace College Conservatory of Music in 2010, Mach toured with the musical Rent as "Gordon" and as the understudy for both leading roles of "Mark" and "Roger". After returning to college from tour, he landed the lead role of "Austin" in the Playhouse Square production of I Love You Because, earning him his Actor's Equity card.

The week of his graduation, he moved to New York City to star in the first reading of Disney's Newsies. Three months later, he joined the First National Tour of Wicked in the Ensemble and the understudy for Fiyero, like Adam Lambert. After a year of touring with Wicked, he made his Broadway debut as the standby for Hunter Parrish as "Jesus" in the first Broadway revival of Godspell.

While as an off-stage standby in Godspell, Mach created a brand new concert series, Broadway Sings, in response to the disorganization and blasé structure of the NYC concert scene. The series takes a well-known pop artist and reconfigures, rearranges, and re-orchestrates their hits for a 14-piece orchestra. Each song is co-arranged by the Broadway performer singing the song; the performers each have a say in how their song sounds, based on their strengths as a vocalist.

In 2013, he was cast in the Broadway production of Hands on a Hardbody, written by Phish frontman Trey Anastasio and lyricist Amanda Green. Later that year, he was cast as the leading role of "Nick Hurley" in the First National Tour of Flashdance.

While on tour in Flashdance in 2014, he was wowed by a production of Witness Uganda at American Repertory Theater, a show in which there were no roles written for him. After a lengthy rewriting process (and renaming the show Invisible Thread), the creative team, led by director Diane Paulus, changed the leading woman's role to a male character. Mach later auditioned in 2015 and was cast as "Ryan" in the Off-Broadway production at Second Stage Theater. The same week, he was cast in the World Premiere production of Waitress at American Repertory Theater, written by Sara Bareilles and also directed by Diane Paulus.

Following Waitress, he starred in three North American premieres: as "Robert E. Lee Prewitt" in From Here To Eternity at Finger Lakes Musical Theater Festival, written by Tim Rice; as "Simon" in Mrs. Miller Does Her Thing, a play with music at Washington D.C.'s Signature Theater, directed and written by James Lapine and starring Debra Monk and Boyd Gaines; and as "Charles Gordon Windsor, Jr." in Mystic Pizza, the musical adaptation of the 1988 movie, at Ogunquit Playhouse.

In 2017, he appeared as "Quasimodo" in the regional premiere of The Hunchback of Notre Dame, a joint production produced by Idaho Shakespeare Festival and Great Lakes Theater.

In 2018, he was cast as "Harry" in the Broadway production of Kinky Boots. He also understudied the role of "Charlie Price", stepping in for pop stars such as Jake Shears, Tyler Glenn, Mark Ballas, Conor Maynard, and David Cook. He closed the production in 2019.

In 2022, he was cast as "Tyler" in the Off-Broadway production of Merrily We Roll Along starring Daniel Radcliffe and understudying Tony Winner Jonathan Groff in the role of "Franklin Shepard". During the run, it was announced the show would move to Broadway and in 2023, the show opened at the Hudson Theater with the Off-Broadway cast intact.

In 2024, he was cast in the leading role of "William Shakespeare" in the First National Tour of the Broadway musical & Juliet which will play in cities such as Chicago, Washington D.C., Boston, Los Angeles, and San Diego.

On television, he has had supporting roles in "FBI" on CBS, "Uncoupled" starring Neil Patrick Harris on Netflix, "The Blacklist" on NBC, "Monsterland" on Hulu, and the cancelled "Codes of Conduct" directed by Steve McQueen. In 2024, he was cast opposite Nathan Lane in the second season of Elsbeth on CBS.

== Stage credits ==
Year(s)	Production	Role	Location
2007-2008	Rent	Gordon, u/s Mark & Roger	National/International Tour
2008	I Love You Because	Austin	14th Street Theater at Playhouse Square
2010	Newsies	Morris Delancey	Staged Industry reading
2010-2011	Wicked	Ensemble, u/s Fiyero	First National Tour
2011-2012	Godspell	standby for Jesus & Judas	Broadway (Circle in the Square Theatre)
2013	Hands on a Hardbody	standby	Broadway (Brooks Atkinson Theater)
2013	Last Queen of Canaan	Bill	Yale Repertory Theater
2013-2014	Flashdance	Nick Hurley	First National Tour
2015	Saturday Night Fever	Tony Manero	Staged Industry reading
2015	Waitress	Ensemble, u/s Dr. Pomatter & Earl	American Repertory Theater
2015	Invisible Thread	Ryan	Second Stage Theater
2016	From Here to Eternity	Robert E. Lee Prewitt	Finger Lakes Musical Theater Festival
2016	Chix 6	Jay	La Mama Experimental Theatre Club
2017	Mrs. Miller Does Her Thing	Simon	Signature Theater
2017	The Hunchback of Notre Dame	Quasimodo	Idaho Shakespeare Festival & Great Lakes Theater
2018-2019	Kinky Boots	Harry, u/s Charlie Price	Broadway (Al Hirschfeld Theater)
2020	ELVIS: The Musical	Elvis	Staged Industry reading
2021	Mystic Pizza	Charles Gordon Windsor, Jr.	Ogunquit Playhouse
2022	Merrily We Roll Along	Tyler, u/s Franklin Shepard	Off-Broadway (New York Theatre Workshop)
2023-2024	Merrily We Roll Along	Tyler, u/s Franklin Shepard	Broadway (Hudson Theater)
2024-2025	& Juliet	William Shakespeare	First National Tour
2026	& Juliet	William Shakespeare	Broadway (Stephen Sondheim Theatre)
