= Mystic Pizza (musical) =

Musical based on the 1988 film of the same name

- Music: Various Artists
- Lyrics: Various Artists
- Book: Sandy Rustin
- Basis: Mystic Pizza (1988); By: Alfred Uhry; Amy Holden Jones; Perry Howze; Randy Howze
- Productions: 2021 Ogunquit Playhouse; 2025 Paper Mill Playhouse

Mystic Pizza is a jukebox musical with a book by Sandy Rustin and score by various artists. The score includes pop music hits from the 1980s.

The musical is based on the 1988 film of the same name that starred Julia Roberts, Lili Taylor and Annabeth Gish. The show is set in Mystic, Connecticut, during the 1980s and follows the lives of three young waitresses at the Mystic Pizza restaurant.

== Production history ==
Work began on the show during the COVID-19 pandemic, with Sandy Rustin writing the book and video-conferencing with the all-female development team from home. The production was directed by Casey Hushion with choreography by Liz Ramos. Orchestrations of the score were done by Carmel Dean. Melissa Etheridge was originally set to score the musical herself. The show does contain one song from her catalog, I'm the Only One.

=== Regional productions (2021–2024) ===
The show had its world premiere at the Ogunquit Playhouse in Maine, running from September 1, 2021, until October 2.

The musical was also staged at the John W. Engeman Theater in Northport, New York from September 15, 2022, until October 30, 2022. The show was workshopped at the Adirondack Theatre Festival from August 5–7, 2022.

The production was then performed at the La Mirada Theatre for the Performing Arts in La Mirada, California, from January 20 through February 11, 2024.

=== Paper Mill Playhouse (2025) ===
A production played at Paper Mill Playhouse in New Jersey from January 29 to February 23, 2025. Krystina Alabado reprised her role as Daisy from prior productions, alongside a new cast including Deanna Giulietti as Jojo and Alaina Anderson as Kat.

=== National Tour (2026) ===
A national tour began October 6, 2026 at the Ordway Center for the Performing Arts in St. Paul Minnesota and will continue to tour around the United States through 2027.

== Original cast and characters ==
Character	Ogunquit (2021)	La Mirada (2024)	Papermill (2025)	National Tour (2026)
Daisy Araújo	Krystina Alabado	Krystina Alabado	Krystina Alabado	Chloe Lezotte
Katherine "Kat" Araújo	Kyra Kennedy	Kyra Kennedy	Alaina Anderson	Kendall Becerra
Josephina "Jojo" Barboza	Gianna Yanelli	Gianna Yanelli	Deánna Giulietti	Lexxi Frilles
Leona Silva	Rayanne Gonzales	Rayanne Gonzales	Jennifer Fouche	Tieisha Thomas
Charles Gordon Windsor Jr.	Corey Mach	Michael Thomas Grant	Vincent Michael	Jack Baylis
William "Bill" Montijo	Garrett Marshall	Jordan Friend	F. Michael Haynie	Matt Woodward
Tim Travers	Joel Perez	Chris Cardozo	Ben Fankhauser	Mike Leadbetter
Mrs. Araújo	Nicole Paloma Sarro	April Josephine	April Josephine	Catherine Rodriguez-O'Connor

== Musical numbers ==
Act I

- "Small Town" – Company
- "Girls Just Want to Have Fun" – Daisy, Kat, Jo
- "Lost in Your Eyes" – Kat
- "Addicted to Love" – Ensemble
- "Take My Breath Away" - Jo, Bill
- "Into the Mystic" – Kat, Tim
- "Small Town (Reprise 1)" – Mrs. Araújo, Frank, Bonnie & Mariana
- "Small Town (Reprise 2)" – Mrs. Araújo
- "The Power of Love" – Ensemble
- "I Think We're Alone Now" – Daisy, Charlie, Jo, Bill
- "Girls Just Want to Have Fun (Reprise)" – Daisy, Jo, Kat
- "I'm the Only One" – Daisy
- "Hold On" – Company

Act II

- "Manic Monday" – Company
- ”When I See You Smile” - Tim & Kat
- "True Colors" - Daisy, Kat
- "You Keep Me Hangin' On" – Daisy, Kat, Jo, Leona
- "Small Town (Reprise 3)" – Leona, Kat & Jo
- "Hit Me with Your Best Shot" – Charlie & Daisy
- "Mad About You" – Jo & Bill
- "Hold On (reprise)" – Kat
- "You Keep Me Hangin' On (reprise)" – Jo, Kat, Daisy & Leona
- "Never Gonna Give You Up" – Frank, Jo, Kat, Leona, Bill & Ensemble
- "Please Forgive Me" – Charlie, Daisy & Ensemble
- ”Nothing's Gonna Stop Us Now” - Company
