= Philippe Arroyo =

American stage actor

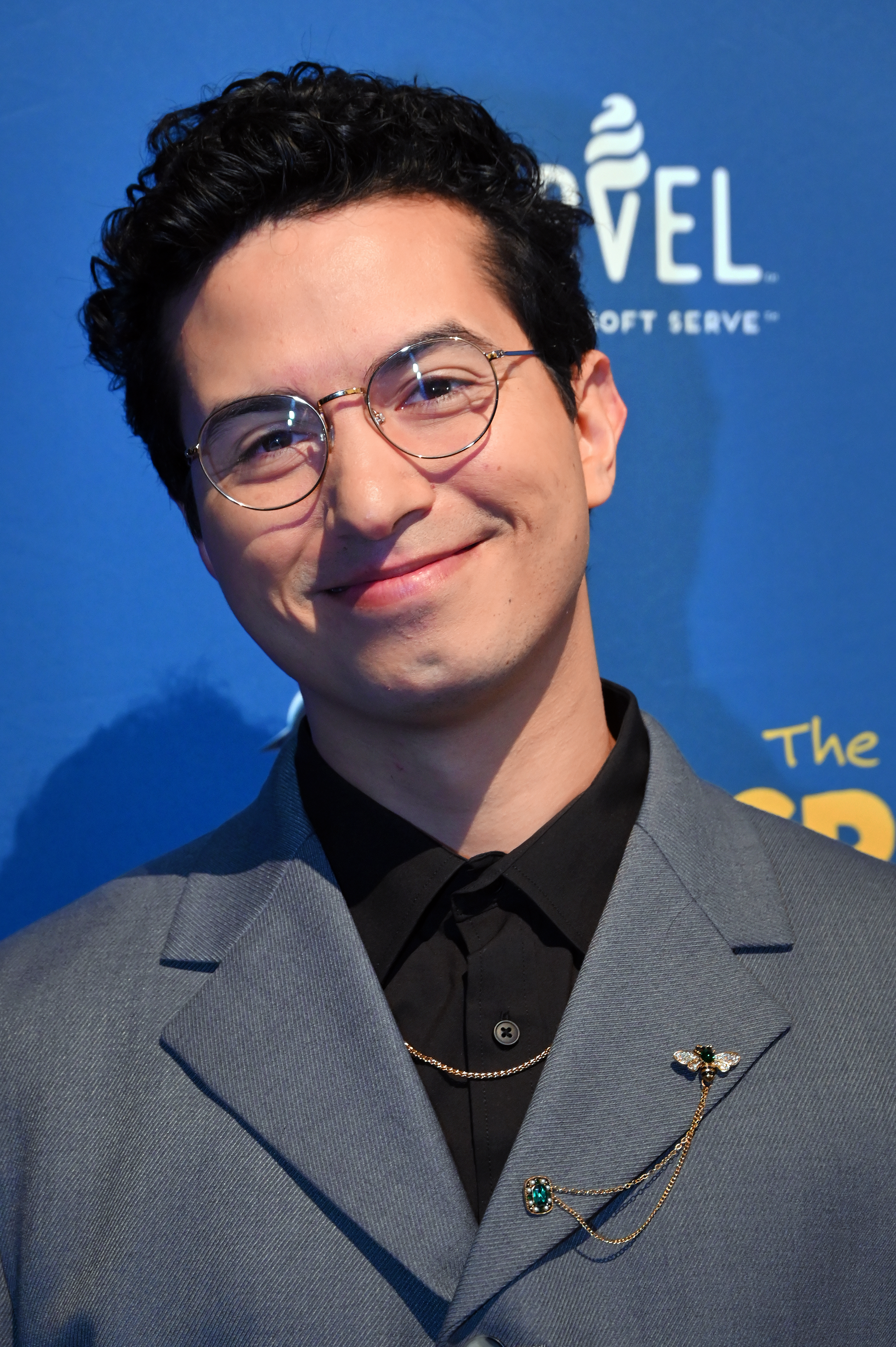
- Arroyo in 2025
- Born: March 24th 1994
- Education: Carnegie Mellon University
- Occupation: Stage actor

Philippe Arroyo is an American stage actor known for his work on Broadway and national tours.

== Early life ==
Philippe Arroyo was born on March 24, 1994 to Grisel Vazquez. As a child he aspired to be a Disney Channel actor so in elementary school his mother decided to have him do a handful of theatre camps. At the age of 13 he played Angel in his local community theatre's production of Rent (School edition), his very first leading role as well as Princeton in Avenue Q later on in 2010. He attended Martin County High School.

== Career ==
A graduate of Carnegie Mellon University, Arroyo made his Broadway debut in 2022 as François in & Juliet. His other credits include roles in Aladdin, Into the Woods, and The Karate Kid The Musical, as well as performances in Punk Rock Girl, Little Shop of Horrors, In the Heights, Penelope, or How The Odyssey Was Really Written, and The 25th Annual Putnam County Spelling Bee. He has also appeared on television in series such as Uncoupled, Evil, and Helpsters.

== Stage credits ==
Year	Title	Role	Venue	Ref.
2016	In the Heights	Sonny	Theatre Under the Stars	
2016	Into the Woods	Jack/Steward	U.S. National Tour	
2017	Aladdin	Omar	U.S. National Tour	
2020	Little Shop of Horrors	Seymour	Pittsburgh Public Theatre	
2022	Punk Rock Girl!	Dudley	Argyle Theatre	
2022	Penelope, or How The Odyssey Was Really Written	Telemachus	York Theatre Company, Off-Broadway	
2022	& Juliet	Francois	Stephen Sondheim Theatre, Broadway	
2025	The 25th Annual Putnam County Spelling Bee	Chip Tolentino	New World Stages, Off-Broadway	

== Filmography ==
Year	Title	Role	Notes	Ref.
2016	[Blank] My Life]	Santa	Episode: 'Ending'	
2016	Truth Slash Fiction	Patrick	TV Movie	
2016	The Race	Kevin		
2017	Back for Good	Male Actor 1		
2021	Here Today	Locker Room Attendant		
2021	Evil	Tom the Intern	Episode: 'I is for IRS'	
2022	Uncoupled	Waiter	Episode: 'Chapter 6'	

== Awards and nominations ==
Year	Award	Category	Work	Result	Ref.
2026	Lucille Lortel Award	Outstanding Ensemble	The 25th Annual Putnam County Spelling Bee	Nominated	
