= The Oblongs =

American adult animated sitcom (2001-2002)

- The Oblongs title card
- Genre: Animated sitcom; Black comedy; Surreal comedy
- Created by: Angus Oblong; Jace Richdale
- Based on: Creepy Susie and 13 Other Tragic Tales for Troubled Children by Angus Oblong
- Voices of: Will Ferrell; Jean Smart; Pamela Adlon; Jason Sklar; Randy Sklar; Jeannie Elias; Lea DeLaria; Becky Thyre; Billy West
- Opening theme: "Oblongs" by They Might Be Giants
- Composers: David Michael Frank; David Schwartz
- Country of origin: United States
- No. of seasons: 1
- No. of episodes: 13

Production
- Executive producers: Jace Richdale; Bruce Helford; Deborah Oppenheimer
- Running time: 22 minutes
- Production companies: Oblong Productions; Film Roman; Jobsite Productions; Mohawk Productions; Warner Bros. Television

Original release
- Network: The WB
- Release: April 1 – May 20, 2001
- Network: Adult Swim
- Release: August 25 – October 20, 2002

The Oblongs (stylized as the Oblongs...) is a 2001 American adult animated sitcom created by Angus Oblong and Jace Richdale. It was Mohawk Productions' first venture into animation. The series premiered on April 1, 2001, on The WB, and was cancelled due to low ratings on May 20, leaving the last five episodes unaired. The remaining episodes were later aired on Cartoon Network's late-night programming block Adult Swim in August 2002, with the series premiering on the network in production order. The series is loosely based on a series of characters introduced in a picture book entitled Creepy Susie and 13 Other Tragic Tales for Troubled Children.

Warner Bros. won the bidding for the rights to turn Angus Oblong's characters into a series; Fox and ABC also made unsuccessful bids. The show was produced by Film Roman, Oblong Productions, Jobsite Productions and Mohawk Productions in association with Warner Bros. Television and animation done by the South Korean studio responsible for The Simpsons, AKOM, the theme song for the series was composed and performed by They Might Be Giants. This was the only animated series to date to have been produced by Bruce Helford under Mohawk.

A total of 13 episodes were produced. All thirteen episodes of The Oblongs were released on DVD on October 4, 2005.

== Setting and premise ==
The series focuses on the antics of a mutant family who lives in the poor valley community part of Hill Valley. As a result of pollution and radiation exposure, they are all either disabled, deformed, or mutated. The pollution is the direct result of the lavish lifestyle of the rich community known as "The Hills", whose residents exploit and harm the valley residents with absolutely no regard for their safety or well-being.

Many reviewers and fans see the series as a commentary on social stratification.

== Characters ==
=== The Oblong family ===
- Bob Oblong (voiced by Will Ferrell) – Born with no limbs, he works at Globocide. Despite his deformities, Bob is very chipper and has a happy-go-lucky attitude. He is married to Pickles and is the father of Biff, Chip, Milo, and Beth. Bob mostly uses his mouth for tasking and moving his torso in ways that can help him get around.
- Marie Kay "Pickles" Oblong (voiced by Jean Smart) is a chain-smoking alcoholic who was originally a Hill resident but moved to the valley after marrying Bob. Due to the hazardous atmosphere of The Valley, all of her hair has since fallen out (something which is usually hidden by an extremely tall blond beehive wig), and she is now regarded as an outcast by her former Hill friends. While not bitter about losing her privileged life, Pickles often expresses disdain towards her self-centered former neighbors in the Hills. She is the mother of Biff, Chip, Milo, and Beth, whom she loves dearly as much as she does her husband.
- Biff Oblong and Chip Oblong (voiced by Randy and Jason Sklar respectively) are the 16-year-old conjoined twins who are attached at the waist and share a middle leg. Biff is a hard worker obsessed with sports, while Chip is more laid back. It is frequently implied that Biff is gay and attracted to their unnamed gym teacher.
- Milo Oblong (voiced by Pamela Adlon) is the son who is afflicted with numerous mental and social disorders. Despite his afflictions, he is a very forthright and benevolent boy, though he envies the Hill lifestyle and wishes to rise above his economic status. Milo has a single hair sticking up on his head, a squint in one eye, and wears a shirt that says "NO". In "Please Be Genital", it is revealed that sex from Milo's parents makes him sleep at night and neither Milo nor his parents know about that.
- Beth Oblong (voiced by Jeannie Elias) is the youngest child and only daughter. She has an elongated wart-like growth from the left side of her head. Despite her appendage, Beth is shown to be better adjusted than the rest of her family.
- Grammy Oblong (vocal effects provided by Lea DeLaria) is Bob's vegetative mother and the grandmother of Biff, Chip, Milo, and Beth who moves around in a motorized wheelchair and is unable to speak. She communicates with an electronic communicator around her torso using a green light which means yes, a red light which means no, and a flashing red light which means she has soiled herself and that her adult diaper needs changing. Later episodes feature an orange light on her communicator whose meaning has not been defined.
- Lucky is the one-lunged family cat who chain-smokes cigarettes and sports an uninterested deadpan expression.
- Scottie is Milo's pet Scottish Terrier, who has narcolepsy due to having perfume used on him during his tenure as a test animal at Globocide. Scottie is based on the short story "Narcoleptic Scottie" in Creepy Susie.

=== Recurring characters ===
- Helga Phugly (voiced by Lea DeLaria) is an overweight toad-like girl who holds the delusional belief that she is pretty and popular.
- Creepy Susie (voiced by Jeannie Elias) is a French-accented melancholic girl who appears to float instead of walk as her legs are never shown and is shown to be into anything macabre.
- Peggy Weggy (voiced by Becky Thyre) is a girl who has one breast and lacks a lower jaw, causing her to spit and talk with a lisp. Despite her deformities, Peggy is cheerful and upbeat.
- Mikey Butts (voiced by Jeannie Elias) is a boy saddled with a dangling, doubled posterior. Because normal underwear can't fit his butt, Mikey has to use his grandmother's old bra as a substitute.
- George Klimer (voiced by Billy West) is Bob's rich and snobby boss at Globocide Incorporated that was founded by J.P. Globo which manufactures pesticides, defoliants, and infant formula. He represents the power and arrogance of the people of the Hills. George is very condescending to his employees, especially Bob and James. He is also implied to be very aporophobic (a fear of poverty). George is the husband of Pristine and father of Jared and Debbie Klimer.
  - Pristine Klimer (voiced by Becky Thyre) is the wife of George and mother to Jared and Debbie. Pristine was good friends with Pickles before she married Bob, but abandoned her once she went to live in the Valley.
  - Jared Klimer (voiced by Pamela Adlon) is the arrogant son of George and Pristine and brother to Debbie. He likes to taunt The Clubhouse Kids, along with his equally snobbish best friend Blaine. He calls Milo "Obdong". In the episode "Get Off My Back", Milo retorts with the information that a rumor of Jared and Blaine claims the two have had sex with each other. Jared even said he goes to therapy in "Milo Interrupted" episode.
  - Debbie Klimer (voiced by Becky Thyre in most episodes, Pamela Adlon in some episodes) is the only daughter of George and Pristine Klimer and sister of Jared. She is the leader of the Debbies and is considered the most beautiful and popular girl in school, even though all of her friends are identical. Like most of The Hills residents, Debbie often treats the people in the Valley with cruelty. She is the only Debbie with her last name known, besides Debbie Bledsoe.
- Blaine (voiced by Billy West) is Jared Klimer's best friend and usually picks on the other kids with his buddy. Although the two are usually just friends, many believe the two are gay, usually being together often.
- Johnny "The Mayor" Bledsoe (voiced by Billy West) is Hill Valley's corrupt mayor with a wrestling mask due to being a former masked wrestler. In "Father of the Bribe", Johnny is shown to be prone to accepting bags of bribe money from anyone.
  - Debbie Bledsoe (voiced by Becky Thyre in most episodes, Pamela Adlon in some episodes) is Johnny Bledsoe's daughter and a member of the Debbies. In the episode "Flush, Flush, Sweet Helga", Johnny gives Debbie a locket for her birthday. She gets upset when Helga wears it, but is happy getting it back and repaired. However, Helga subsequently loses the locket in the sewers.
- The Debbies (voiced by Becky Thyre in most episodes, Pamela Adlon in some episodes) are a popular clique of identical girls who all look exactly the same and are all named Debbie. Despite them all being identical, each Debbie is the daughter of a different wealthy Hills resident like George Klimer and Johnny Bledsoe, with no relation. They seem to be a symbol of how most popular people tend to be conformists and lack individuality. The Debbies are often cruel to the Valley kids, especially Helga who aspires to be accepted by them.
- Leland Bergstein (voiced by Billy West) is the kids' homeroom teacher who is shown to be weak and easily cowed by the Debbies and the rich residents of the town. It is revealed that he lives in the Hills as seen in the episode "Milo Interrupted".
- Sheriff Pepper (voiced by Billy West) is Hill Valley's inept and corrupt sheriff. He favors the people of the Hills and provides better law enforcement for them.
  - J.J. is a deputy that works under Sheriff Pepper.
- Dr. M. Hofschneider (voiced by Billy West) is the Oblongs' doctor who is condescending and dishes out insults.
- Mrs. Hubbard (voiced by Laraine Newman) is the town's Bible-thumping, gun-toting old woman who is appointed Czar of Child and Family Services after a disturbance in the Hills is blamed on valley kids. She never married or had children. Mrs. Hubbard wears a chastity belt called "The Forni-Guard 2000".
- Anita Bidet (voiced by Billy West) is the owner of the bar called The Rusty Bucket Pickles frequents. Her name is a play on the phrase "I need a bidet." It is implied that she is transgender. Anita's assumed male form (when originally named "Andy") is seen during a flashback of how Bob and Pickles met. Although when questioned about it in the present, Anita claims that she had a brother.
- Nurse Rench (voiced by Laraine Newman) is the school nurse who is described by Peggy as "a godless butcher without a shred of legitimate medical training". She has an operating contraption in place of her right arm, has four breasts arranged in a pattern resembling a cow's udder, and a deformed left hand. On one occasion, the Clubhouse Kids enlisted Nurse Rench to fix Debbie Klimer's face which she successfully did.
- James (voiced by Billy West) is Bob's hunchbacked co-worker with a massive hunch with a bigger left side and a stooped posture. He is a people-pleaser and lacks self-esteem to the point where he buys friends on eBay to attend his bachelor party. James is shown to be infatuated with Anita.

== Episodes ==
No.	Title	Directed by	Written by	Original release date	Prod. code	U.S. viewers (millions)
1	"Misfit Love"	Vincent Waller	Jace Richdale	April 1, 2001 (The WB); August 4, 2002 (Adult Swim)	236-001	2.16
Milo Oblong gets transferred to public school after his father Bob is taken off his job's insurance for filing too many claims and falls for a beautiful, popular girl named Yvette who's really an alien. Meanwhile, Bob tries to find a second job to pay the medical bills.
2	"Narcoleptic Scottie"	Bob Jaques	Scott Buck	April 8, 2001 (The WB); August 18, 2002 (Adult Swim)	236-003	3.34
In an attempt to calm his hyperactivity, Bob and Pickles let Milo care for an injured Scottish terrier, but when the dog proves to be a bad influence on Milo, he's forced to give the dog up for adoption.
3	"Milo Interrupted"	Kelly Armstrong	Ben Kull	April 15, 2001 (The WB); September 29, 2002 (Adult Swim)	236-009	2.49
After a Hill kid chucks a rock at the window of Mr. Bergstein's house, Mayor Johnny "The Mayor" Bledsoe blames the valley children and hires a Bible-thumping, gun nut named Mrs. Hubbard to investigate the Valley for dysfunctional families and juvenile delinquents. Meanwhile, Milo discovers that Helga's parents are missing and must care for her, making Bob suspect that Milo is abusing drugs.
4	"Bucketheads"	Joe Horne	Scott Buck	April 22, 2001 (The WB); October 13, 2002 (Adult Swim)	236-011	1.90
Milo becomes an unlikely trendsetter for the Hill kids after Pickles sends him to school with a bucket on his head, but the fame goes to Milo's head when Milo sets out to create his own line of offbeat attire.
5	"Heroine Addict"	Monte Young	Joey Soloway and Scott Buck	April 29, 2001 (The WB); October 27, 2002 (Adult Swim)	236-013	2.16
Pickles wins the chance at a shopping spree from a cigarette company, but when she passes out after smoking one too many cigarettes, Pickles decides to quit smoking (and drinking alcohol after inadvertently setting her finger on fire) and becomes a thrill-seeker after knocking out a woman during Tae-Bo class.
6	"The Golden Child"	Linda Miller	Leonard Dick	May 6, 2001 (The WB); September 22, 2002 (Adult Swim)	236-008	2.71
Bob Oblong becomes depressed after learning all his suggestions to make Globocide better have been used as kindling for the factory's furnace. Meanwhile, Milo creates an energy drink called "Manic", and is named "The Corporate Messiah" by the board of directors at Globocide as they think he is the reincarnation of the company's founder J.P. Globo.
7	"Flush, Flush, Sweet Helga"	Monte Young	Jace Richdale	May 13, 2001 (The WB); September 1, 2002 (Adult Swim)	236-005	1.98
When Milo and his friends get caught crashing a Debbie birthday party, Helga ends up losing Debbie Bledsoe's locket which she received from her father Mayor Bledsoe and goes in the sewers to retrieve it, only to be stuck in the Valley's sewer pipes, and the Hill people don't see it as a problem -- until a failed attempt to get Helga out results in Mayor Bledsoe sending Sheriff Pepper to annex the Oblongs' house (which isn't affected by Helga being stuck in the pipes) for water.
8	"Disfigured Debbie"	Joe Horne	Joey Soloway	May 20, 2001 (The WB); August 11, 2002 (Adult Swim)	236-002	2.40
Milo runs for class president, but loses to Debbie Klimer who ends up an outcast after falling in a thresher. The Oblongs try to cater to Debbie by having her bunk at their house. Of course being without Debbie has also left George depressed and unable to discipline his workers as usual.
9	"Pickles' Little Amazons"	Skip Jones	Ben Kull	August 25, 2002	236-004	N/A
Pickles gets arrested by Sheriff Pepper for neglecting Beth after trying to rescue her from a giant Venus flytrap that Sheriff Pepper's men put down and is sentenced community service by working as a den mother for a vaguely lesbian Girl Scout-esque troop called "The Little Amazons."
10	"Get Off My Back"	Jack Dyer	Eric Friedman	September 8, 2002	236-006	N/A
An accident involving Insani-Glue and Milo getting chased by Biff and Chip results in Milo getting stuck to Biff and Chip's back, which cuts into their training for the two-man triathlon against Hill kids Jared and Blaine. Meanwhile, Beth feels left out and begins sticking herself to others.
11	"Please Be Genital"	Gary McCarver	Leonard Dick	September 15, 2002	236-007	N/A
Bob gets his genitals crushed by a stripper wearing clogs during his best friend James' bachelor party. When he confesses to Pickles that they can't have sex for two weeks under the orders of Dr. Hofschneider, Pickles begins wondering whether or not her marriage to Bob is real. Meanwhile, Milo becomes an insomniac when Pickles and Bob stop having sex.
12	"My Name is Robbie"	Vincent Waller	Joey Soloway	October 6, 2002	236-010	N/A
Bob gets his jaw injured at Globocide's theme park which ends up examined by the attending Dr. Hofschneider who even suggests a lawsuit. At the advice of company attorneys, Bob is given a robotic body by George Klimer with the arms and legs he never had, which gives him the confidence to quit his job and become a lifeguard.
13	"Father of the Bribe"	Michael Kim and Bob Jaques	Eric Friedman	October 20, 2002	236-012	N/A
Biff and Chip get their driver's licenses and crash Bob's car during a drag race. Biff and Chip then buy Bob a new car at a police auction held by Sheriff Pepper and come across the Mayor's bribe money which they spend on themselves, despite nightmarish harassment from city officials.

== Broadcast ==
The show premiered on April 1, 2001, on The WB but failed to find an audience. On May 20, 2001, The WB aired "Disfigured Debbie", the second episode produced, as the season finale, leaving five episodes unaired. Reruns of the first eight episodes, and the five remaining episodes, premiered on Cartoon Network's late-night programming block, Adult Swim, airing in production order from August 4 to October 27, 2002 (hence the out of order premieres), and the entire series was rerun on the block until December 26, 2015.

In Canada, the series aired on Teletoon as part of "Teletoon Unleashed". In Australia, the show premiered on the Nine Network on December 8, 2001, however due to insufficient ratings, it was withdrawn after one episode, but was eventually shown in a late-night/early morning time slot. The series aired from November 5, 2004, to September 29, 2006, on TBS's late-night programming block, Too Funny To Sleep. The series aired on TBS again from April 15, 2013, to February 20, 2015.

== Home media ==
The entire series was released on a two-disc DVD set in the United States on October 4, 2005.

DVD name	Release date	Ep #	Features
The Complete Twisted Series	October 4, 2005	13	"It's an Oblong World" – The show's concept, characters and casting, "The Art of the Oblongs" Angus Oblong-guided tour of his original artwork for the series, and "An Oblong Picture Book" – Angus Oblong drawings gallery.

== Reception ==
Since its premiere, the show has received mixed reviews from critics. On Rotten Tomatoes, the review aggregator, the first season has an approval rating of 44% based on 18 reviews, with an average rating of 7.5/10. The site's consensus reads: "The Oblongs has talent and visual style to spare, but its attempts at satire sorely miss the mark."

The audiences, on the other hand, gave a positive reaction for its humor. Emily Ashby of Common Sense Media rated the show four stars out of five, saying that the show's "overall mood is a positive one, and adults and mature teens who can put the humor in perspective are bound to enjoy the show." However, she stated that the series garnered many criticisms for its debuted on The WB for its "extremely disabled characters."

=== Awards and nominations ===
The Oblongs won the Artios award in 2001 for Best Casting for Animated Voiceover – Television (Mary V. Buck and Susan Edelman).
