= Creepy Susie and 13 Other Tragic Tales for Troubled Children =

Book by Angus Oblong

Creepy Susie and 13 Other Tragic Tales for Troubled Children by Angus Oblong, creator of the Oblongs

Creepy Susie and 13 Other Tragic Tales for Troubled Children is a 1999 collection of illustrated short stories written by Angus Oblong. The stories mostly feature children and adolescents, although one story is about a dog. Several of the characters were eventually adapted for use in the animated television series The Oblongs. Contrary to the title, children are not the book's target audience as the book contains sexual situations, cannibalism and murder.

== The Oblongs ==
The Oblongs is a television series based on the characters from this book starring the voices of Will Ferrell, Jean Smart, Pamela Adlon, the Sklar Brothers, Jeannie Elias, Lea DeLaria, Becky Thyre, and Billy West. Milo from the book becomes Milo Oblong, the de facto main character in the TV series; Creepy Susie and Helga both appear as his friends, while the Debbies appear as snobbish enemies (Helga, in the series, is obsessed with them, though out of a desire to join them rather than hurt them; however, she does at one point join them as in the book). Scottie the dog becomes Milo's pet. Many of the other characters do not appear on the show. Some of them are composite characters of the book's characters.
