= Angus Oblong =

American writer and illustrator (born 1976)

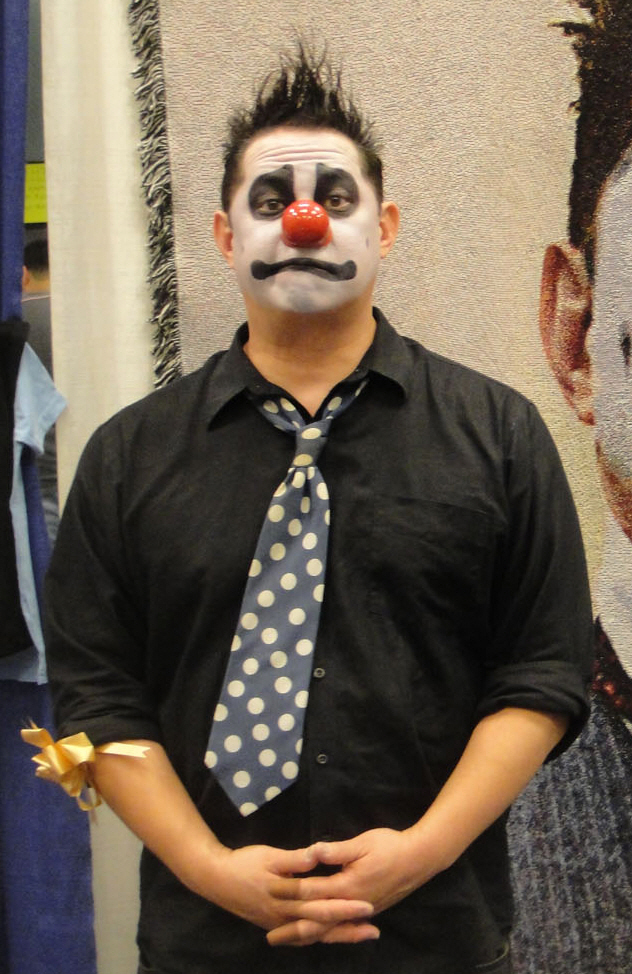
- Oblong at Long Beach Comic Expo 2012
- Born: David Adam Walker; August 28, 1976 (age 49); Sacramento, California
- Occupations: Writer, illustrator
- Writing career
- Pen name: Angus Oblong
- Notable works: Creepy Susie and 13 Other Tragic Tales for Troubled Children; The Oblongs
- Website: www.angusoblong.com

David Adam Walker (born August 28, 1976), better known by his pen name Angus Oblong, is an American writer and illustrator best known for his work Creepy Susie and 13 Other Tragic Tales for Troubled Children (1999) and the 2001 animated television series The Oblongs.

== Early years ==
David Adam Walker was born on August 28, 1976, in Sacramento, California, to Elizabeth Marie (née Angus), a former preschool teacher turned homemaker, and Dr. Robert David Walker, MD, a retired surgeon. Walker's pen name "Angus Oblong" is based in part on his mother's maiden name. He attended the University of California, Berkeley for a couple of years.

== Career ==
Oblong's 1999 book, Creepy Susie and 13 Other Tragic Tales for Troubled Children, consists of 14 short stories of adult-oriented humor. The character Milo was based on a young version of himself.

When his work began garnering attention from the press, Oblong began wearing "thick clown makeup and a bulbous, red plastic nose" in public appearances. He initially adopted the clown makeup in an effort to maintain his privacy.

A self-published sequel to Creepy Susie and 13 Other Tragic Tales for Troubled Children, 13 More Tragic Tales for Ugly Children, is available from his website. He has also self-published three collections of drawings: Angus Oblong Random Drawings Book One, Book Two and Book Three.

Oblong moved to Los Angeles, California, at the request of his agent when a "bidding war" was underway between Fox, The WB, or Disney to produce an animated television show created by him. His animated television series, The Oblongs, aired originally on The WB. It was later syndicated on Adult Swim. Many of the characters from his animated TV series The Oblongs first appeared in his book, Creepy Susie and 13 Other Tragic Tales for Troubled Children, including Milo and Creepy Susie. The version of Milo that appears in the television show The Oblongs is a less exaggerated version of the character from the book. The complete series was released on DVD.

Oblong wrote, directed, and produced Deliriously Jen, a television pilot that aired on Comedy Central and was shown at several film festivals in 2005.

The Victorian Hotel, a play written by Oblong, and created in association with Rogue Artists Ensemble, featuring many of his characters as puppets, played October through December 2006 at the Powerhouse Theatre in Santa Monica, California. In 2018, The Victorian Hotel traveled to Seattle.

In 2010, LA Weekly named him one of the L.A. People 2009.

== Influences ==
Oblong had many favorite cartoons growing up, such as Looney Tunes, Animaniacs, Freakazoid!, and Earthworm Jim. He was also influenced by distorted characters from the Dick and Jane books, Brothers Grimm fairy tales, and some real life oddities in Ripley's Believe It or Not!.

== See also ==
- Charles Addams
- Edward Gorey
- Gahan Wilson
- Marvin Townsend
- Robert Crumb
