= Workshop production =

Form of theatrical performance

A workshop production is a form of theatrical performance, in which a play or musical is staged in a modest form which does not include some aspects of a full production. For example, costumes, sets and musical accompaniment may be excluded, or may be included in a simpler form. In contrast, tryout productions are usually presented as full productions, with performers in costume, on a set, and accompanied by an orchestra or band.

Under the Actors' Equity Workshop Code, a workshop "can be produced for about one-eighth of what a Off-Broadway production would cost, and for about one-twentieth of what a Broadway production would cost". A producer can develop works at less expense in the workshop format, and can present those works to potential investors to solicit their backing for higher-quality productions.

One common purpose of a workshop production is to provide a preview staging of a new work in order to gauge audience and critical reaction, following which some parts of the work may be adjusted or rewritten before the work's official premiere. Because a workshop production generally pays less for the rights to perform the play, workshop productions also provide an opportunity for smaller theatres to generate increased publicity by staging a popular or highly anticipated work for which a full production might be too costly. Some theatre companies, in fact, specialize exclusively in workshop productions; amateur and youth theatre companies, for example, are commonly structured on the workshop production model.

Some fictional works, including the musical A Chorus Line and the television series Smash, depict the audition and workshop processes of developmental theatrical productions.

== See also ==
- Read-through
