= Toronto Theatre Critics Awards =

The Toronto Theatre Critics Awards are annual awards, presented by a committee of theatre critics in the media of Toronto, Ontario, to honour achievements in the city's theatre production in the previous year.

The awards were launched in 2011 by John Colbourn of the Toronto Sun, Richard Ouzounian of the Toronto Star, Robert Cushman of the National Post and J. Kelly Nestruck of The Globe and Mail, as the first new opportunity for Toronto theatre critics to vote on or present awards since the discontinuation of the Floyd S. Chalmers Canadian Play Award in 2001.

The awards went on hiatus after 2020, due to the impact of the COVID-19 pandemic on theatre production. They returned in 2024.

== Awards ==
=== Best New Canadian Play ===
Year	Recipient	Play	Ref
2012	Ins Choi	Kim's Convenience	
2013	Hannah Moscovitch	This Is War	
2014	Robert Lepage	Needles and Opium	
2015	Michel Marc Bouchard	Tom at the Farm	
2016	Jordan Tannahill	Botticelli in the Fire & Sunday in Sodom	
2017	Norah Sadava, Amy Nostbakken	Mouthpiece	
2018	Hannah Moscovitch	Bunny	
2018	Matthew MacKenzie	Bears	
2019	Ho Ka Kei	Iphigenia and the Furies (On Taurian Land)	
2020	Anthony MacMahon, Thomas McKechnie	The Jungle	
2024	Nick Green	Casey and Diana	
2024	Michael Healey	The Master Plan	
2025	Miriam Fernandes, Ravi Jain	Mahabharata	
2025	Veronica Hortigüela, Annie Luján	Monks	

=== Best New International Play ===
To be eligible for this award, a play only has to have received its first production in the Toronto market within the eligibility period, and does not necessarily have to be a world debut.

Year	Recipient	Play	Ref
2012	Roland Schimmelpfennig	The Golden Dragon	
2013	Mark O'Rowe	Terminus	
2014	Sarah Ruhl	Passion Play	
2015	Stephen Adly Guirgis	The Motherfucker with the Hat	
2016	None presented		
2017	Annie Baker	John	
2018	Stephen Karam	The Humans	
2019	Tarell Alvin McCraney	The Brothers Size	
2020	Annie Baker	The Flick	
2024	Natalya Vorozhbit (Sasha Dugdale, translator)	Bad Roads	
2025	Annie Baker	Infinite Life	
2025	Heidi Schreck	What the Constitution Means to Me	

=== Best New Musical ===
Year	Recipient	Play	Ref
2012	Jacob Richmond, Brooke Maxwell	Ride the Cyclone	
2016	Red One Theatre Collective	The Chasse-Galerie	
2019	Hannah Moscovitch, Christian Barry, Ben Caplan	Old Stock: A Refugee Love Story	

=== Best Production of a Play ===
Year	Recipient	Play	Ref
2011	Theatre Passe Muraille, Canadian Stage	The Middle Place	
2012	Tarragon Theatre	The Small Room at the Top of the Stairs	
2013	Mirvish Productions	Terminus	
2014	Soulpepper Theatre	Angels in America	
2014	Tarragon Theatre	Lungs	
2015	Mirvish Productions	Arcadia	
2015	Outside the March	Mr. Burns, A Post-Electric Play	
2016	Butcher's Block Collective, Why Not Theatre	Butcher	
2017	The Company Theatre	John	
2017	Ex Machina, Canadian Stage	887	
2018	Canadian Stage	The Humans	
2019	Obsidian Theatre, Nightwood Theatre	School Girls; Or, the African Mean Girls Play	
2020	Outside the March, Crow's Theatre	The Flick	
2024	Canadian Stage	The Inheritance	
2025	Why Not Theatre, Canadian Stage	Mahabharata	

=== Best Production of a Musical ===
Year	Recipient	Play	Ref
2011	Lincoln Centre	South Pacific	
2012	Acting Up Stage Company	Caroline, or Change	
2013	Mirvish Productions	The Book of Mormon	
2014	Canadian Stage	London Road	
2015	Soulpepper Theatre	Spoon River	
2016	Mirvish Productions	Kinky Boots	
2017	Mirvish Productions	Come from Away	
2018	Musical Stage Company	Fun Home	
2019	Young People's Theatre	Mary Poppins	
2020	Orin Wolf, Stylesfour Productions, Evamere Entertainment, Atlantic Theater Co.	The Band's Visit	
2024	Crow’s Theatre, Musical Stage Company	Natasha, Pierre & The Great Comet of 1812	
2025	Soulpepper Theatre, Musical Stage Company, Crow’s Theatre, TO Live	A Strange Loop	

=== Best Lead Actor and Actress in a Play ===
Year	Recipient	Play	Ref
2011	David Ferry	Blasted	
2011	Yanna McIntosh	Ruined	
2012	Paul Sun-Hyung Lee	Kim's Convenience	
2012	Nicole Underhay	The Small Room at the Top of the Stairs	
2013	Stuart Hughes	The Crucible	
2013	Michelle Monteith	Little One	
2014	Damien Atkins	Angels in America	
2014	Carly Street	Venus in Fur	
2015	David Ferry	Blackbird	
2015	Fiona Reid	Vanya and Sonia and Masha and Spike	
2016	Kawa Ada	Bombay Black	
2016	Laura Condlin	An Enemy of the People	
2017	Dawn Jani Birley	Prince Hamlet	
2017	André Sills	"Master Harold"...and the Boys	
2018	Lovell Adams-Gray	Ma Rainey's Black Bottom	
2018	Laakkuluk Williamson Bathory	Kiinalik: These Sharp Tools	
2019	Eric Peterson	The Father	
2020	Daren A. Herbert	Jesus Hopped the 'A' Train	
2020	Amy Rutherford	A Streetcar Named Desire	
2024	Sean Arbuckle	Casey and Diana	
2024	Amaka Umeh	Sizwe Banzi Is Dead	
2025	Ins Choi	Kim's Convenience	
2025	Noah Reid	A Case for the Existence of God	

=== Best Lead Actor and Actress in a Musical ===
Year	Recipient	Play	Ref
2011	Louise Pitre	A Year with Frog and Toad	
2011	Tony Sheldon	Priscilla, Queen of the Desert	
2012	Sahr Ngaujah	Fela!	
2012	Arlene Duncan	Caroline, or Change	
2013	Bruce Dow	Of a Monstrous Child: A Gaga Musical	
2013	Bree Greig	Do You Want What I Have Got? A Craigslist Cantata	
2014	Ramin Karimloo	Les Misérables	
2014	Chilina Kennedy	The Little Mermaid	
2015	Daren A. Herbert	The Wild Party	
2015	Trish Lindstrom	Once	
2016	Alan Mingo Jr.	Kinky Boots	
2016	Carly Heffernan	One Night Only	
2017	Beau Dixon	Passing Strange	
2017	Patricia Cano	The (Post) Mistress	
2018	Jordan Cheng	Mr. Shi and His Lover	
2018	Hannah Levinson, Sara Farb, Laura Condlln	Fun Home	
2019	Robert Markus	Dear Evan Hansen	
2020	Jully Black	Caroline, or Change	
2020	Chilina Kennedy	The Band's Visit	
2024	Damien Atkins	De Profundis: Oscar Wilde in Jail	
2025	Malachi McCaskill	A Strange Loop	

=== Best Supporting Actor and Actress in a Play ===
Year	Recipient	Play	Ref
2011	Richard McMillan	After Akhmatova	
2011	Cara Ricketts	Eternal Hydra	
2012	Kelli Fox	The Penelopiad	
2012	Philip Riccio	The Test	
2013	Maev Beaty	Proud	
2013	Alon Nashman	THIS	
2014	Ian D. Clark	Cock	
2014	Nancy Palk	Angels in America	
2015	Juan Chioran	The Motherfucker with the Hat	
2015	Beatriz Pizano	Blood Wedding	
2016	Anna Chatterton	Independent Aunties	
2016	Danny Ghantous	A Line in the Sand	
2017	James Daly		
2017	Nora McLellan	John	
2018	Carolyn Fe	Calpurnia	
2018	Maxwell Haynes	The Aliens	
2019	Akosua Amo-Adem	School Girls; Or, the African Mean Girls Play	
2019	Sabryn Rock	The Royale	
2020	Sarah Dodd	Marjorie Prime	
2024	Jadyn Nasato	Four Minutes	
2024	Oyin Oladejo	Three Sisters	
2025	Nancy Palk	Infinite Life	
2025	Dan Mousseau	There Is Violence and There Is Righteous Violence and There Is Death, or, The Born-Again Crow	

=== Best Supporting Actor and Actress in a Musical ===
Year	Recipient	Play	Ref
2011	Oliver Dennis	The Fantasticks	
2011	Kate Hennig	Billy Elliot the Musical	
2012	Deborah Hay	Caroline, or Change	
2012	Elliott Loran	Ride the Cyclone	
2013	Darrin Baker	Falsettos	
2013	Bryn McAuley	Snow White: The Deliciously Dopey Family Musical	
2014	James Monroe Iglehart	Aladdin	
2014	Lana Carillo	The Little Mermaid	
2015	Susan Gilmour	The Wild Party	
2015	Jacob MacInnis	James and the Giant Peach	
2016	Justin Bolt	The Wizard of Oz	
2016	AJ Bridel	Kinky Boots	
2017	Dan Chameroy	Matilda the Musical	
2017	Vanessa Sears	Passing Strange	
2018	Cynthia Dale	Fun Home	
2018	Derek Kwan	Mr. Shi and His Lover	
2019	Mary Fay Coady	Old Stock: A Refugee Love Story	
2019	Jessica Sherman	Dear Evan Hansen	
Ephraim Sykes	Ain't Too Proud		
2020	Vanessa Sears	Caroline, or Change	
2024	George Krissa	Natasha, Pierre & The Great Comet of 1812	
2024	Heeyun Park	Natasha, Pierre & The Great Comet of 1812	
2025	Julia Pulo	Life After	

=== Best Ensemble Performance in a Play ===
Year	Recipient	Play	Ref
2019	Rachel Cairns, Aisha Evelyna, Ruth Goodwin, Annelise Hawrylak, Ula Jurecka, Brittany Kay, Heath V. Salazar, Hallie Seline, Amaka Umeh, Robyn Stevan	The Wolves	
2020	Colin Doyle, Amy Keating, Durae McFarlane, Brendan McMurtry-Howlett	The Flick	
2020	Kaleb Alexander, Mazin Elsadig, Alex McCooeye	Pass Over	
2024	Christopher Allen, Ben Carlson, Philippa Domville, Peter Fernandes, Tara Nicodemo, Yanna McIntosh, Mike Shara	The Master Plan	
2025	Kragva, Moog, Wug	Goblin: Macbeth	

=== Best Ensemble Performance in a Musical ===
Year	Recipient	Play	Ref
2019	Rielle Braid, Peter Deiwick, Bruce Dow, Donna Garner, Kira Guloien, David Fox, Britta Johnson, Dave Autar, Mia Johnson, Zahra Khan, Abi Lee, Liam Lockhart-Rush, Alejandra Nunez, James Parchment, Danté Prince, Emmett Young, Jill Wood	Dr. Silver: A Celebration of Life	
2020	Beau Dixon, Hailey Gillis, Kira Guloien, Andrew Penner	Ghost Quartet	
2024	Dave Ball, Joel Cumber, Eva Foote, Peter Fernandes, Mike Jackson, Julia McLellan, Jessica Sherman, Margaret Thompson, Kelsey Verzotti, Jeremy Walmsley	Kelly v. Kelly	
2025	Charlie Clark, Sierra Holder, Nathanael Judah, David Lopez, Marcus Nance, Matt Nethersole, David Andrew Reid, and Amaka Umeh	A Strange Loop	

=== Best Solo Performance in a Play or Musical ===
Year	Recipient	Play	Ref
2025	Haley McGee	Age Is a Feeling	

=== Best Director of a Play ===
Year	Recipient	Play	Ref
2011	Gina Wilkinson	Wide Awake Hearts	
2012	Weyni Mengesha	The Small Room at the Top of the Stairs	
2013	Mitchell Cushman	Terminus	
2014	Albert Schultz	Of Human Bondage	
2015	Soheil Parsa	Blood Wedding	
2016	Ravi Jain	Salt-Water Moon	
2017	Philip Akin	"Master Harold"...and the Boys	
2018	Erin Brubacher	Kiinalik: These Sharp Tools	
2018	Jani Lauzon	The Monument	
2019	Nina Lee Aquino	School Girls; Or, the African Mean Girls Play	
2019	Mumbi Tindyebwa Otu	The Brothers Size	
2020	Philip Akin	Actually	
2020	Philip Akin	Pass Over	
2024	Andrew Kushnir	Bad Roads	
2024	Leora Morris	The Sound Inside	
2025	Dylan Trowbridge	Cock	

=== Best Director of a Musical ===
Year	Recipient	Play	Ref
2012	Britt Small, Jacob Richmond	Ride the Cyclone	
2013	Casey Nicholaw, Trey Parker	The Book of Mormon	
2014	Jackie Maxwell	London Road	
2015	Albert Schultz	Spoon River	
2016	Tyrone Savage	The Chasse-Galerie	
2017	Christopher Ashley	Come from Away	
2018	Robert McQueen	Fun Home	
2019	Christian Barry	Old Stock: A Refugee Love Story	
2020	Marie Farsi	Ghost Quartet	
2020	Conor McPherson	Girl from the North Country	
2024	Gregory Prest	De Profundis: Oscar Wilde in Jail	
2025	Ilana Khanin	I Was Unbecoming Then	

=== Best Design of a Play or Musical ===
Year	Recipient	Play	Ref
2011	Robert Gardiner	Studies in Motion: The Hauntings of Eadweard Muybridge	
2012	Creative team (names not specified in source)	War Horse	
2013	Nick Blais	Terminus	
2014	Lorenzo Savoini (sets and lighting), Erika Connor (costumes), Mike Ross (sound)	Of Human Bondage	
2015	Nick Blais, Ken Mackenzie, Lindsay Junkin, Sam Sholdice, Marcus Jamin	Mr. Burns, A Post-Electric Play	
2016	Owen Belton, Alessandro Juliani, Meg Roe, Jay Gower Taylor, Tom Visser, Nancy Bryant	Betroffenheit	
2016	Lorenzo Savoini, Kimberly Purtell, Debashis Sinha	Eurydice	
2017	Robert Lepage, Jean-Sébastien Côté, Laurent Routhier, Félix Fradet-Faguy	887	
2018	Nick Blais, Lindsay Dagger Junkin, Andre du Toit, Richard Feren	Jerusalem	
2019	Patrick Lavender, Richard Feren, Michelle Bohn, Nick Bottomley	The Nether	
2020	Nick Blais, Nick Bottomley, Anahita Dehbonehie, Richard Feren	The Flick	
2024	Nick Blais, Heidi Chan, Anahita Dehbonehie, Niloufar Ziaee	A Public Reading of an Unproduced Screenplay About the Death of Walt Disney	

=== Best Scenic Design of a Play or Musical ===
Year	Recipient	Play	Ref
2025	Ken Mackenzie	Last Landscape	

=== Best Lighting Design of a Play or Musical ===
Year	Recipient	Play	Ref
2025	Bonnie Beecher, Jeff Pybus	People, Places and Things	
2025	Chris Malkowski	Measure for Measure	

=== Best Costume Design of a Play or Musical ===
Year	Recipient	Play	Ref
2025	Pythia	Oraculum	

=== Best Sound Design of a Play or Musical ===
Year	Recipient	Play	Ref
2025	John Gzowski, Suba Sankaran	Mahabharata	

=== Special Citation ===
Year	Recipient	Reason	Ref
2011	Ken Gass	Contributions to Toronto theatre as founder and artistic director of Factory Theatre	
2012	Eric Peterson	Lifetime achievement as an actor	
2013	None presented		
2014	VideoCabaret	Outstanding body of work	
2015	None presented		
2016	Videofag		
2017	Jon Kaplan	Posthumous honour as a theatre critic	
2018	Bob Nasmith	"untraditional, decades-long theatre career and his spirit of adventure and enquiry"	
2019	None presented		
2020	Outside the March	creative response to the COVID-19 pandemic via the improvisational phone-based drama The Ministry of Mundane Mysteries	
2024	Daniel MacIvor	Exceptional artistic achievement	
2025	Buddies in Bad Times, Native Earth Performing Arts	There Is Violence and There Is Righteous Violence and There Is Death, or, The Born-Again Crow	
2025	Weyni Mengesha	Contributions to Toronto theatre as artistic director of Soulpepper Theatre from 2018 to 2025	

== See also ==
- Dora Mavor Moore Awards
