= Dora Mavor Moore Award for Best Original Musical (Musical Theatre) =

The Dora Mavor Moore Award for Outstanding New Musical/Opera is an annual award celebrating achievements in Toronto theatre.

== Awards and nominations ==
=== 1990s ===
Year	Playwright	Title	Ref
1998	Guy Mignault, Félix Leclerc	C'était un p'tit bonheur	
1998	Atom Egoyan, Rodney Sharman	Elsewhereless	
1998	Mordecai Richler, John Roby	Jacob Two-Two's First Spy Case	
1998	Second City Ensemble	What Fresh Mel Is This?	
1999	Richardo Keens-Douglas	The Nutmeg Princess	
1999	Robertson Davies, Randolph Peters	The Golden Ass	
1999	Jim Garrard, Grant Heckman	Sir John, Eh?	
1999	Tom Lackey, Rick Fox	Needfire	
1999	Richard Maltby, Jr., Chet Walker, Ann Reinking	Fosse	

=== 2000s ===
Year	Playwright	Title	Ref
2000	Ann-Marie MacDonald, Allen Cole, Alisa Palmer	Anything That Moves	
2000	Leslie Arden	A Meeting of Minds	
2000	Dean Regan, Sam Lutfiyya	Forever Swing	
2000	Gavin Crawford, Tracy Dawson, Marypat Farrell, Melody Johnson, Doug Morency, Lee Smart	Nude Beach Wear 100% Off	
2000	Ted Swindley, Ted Dykstra, Charles T. Cozens, Stephen Mayoff	Swingstep	
2001	Chan Ka Nin, Mark Brownell	Iron Road	
2001	Marek Norman, Richard Ouzounian	Larry's Party	
2001	Joey Miller, Brad Fraser	Outrageous	
2001	Allen Cole, Glen Cairns	The Crimson Veil	
2002	Damien Atkins	Real Live Girl	
2002	Guy Mignault	La, la, la, mine de rien	
2003	Jay Turvey, Paul Sportelli, Morwyn Brebner	Little Mercy's First Murder	
2003	Greg Robic	Assemblywomen!	
2003	Allen Cole, J. Douglas Dodd, Stephen Eddins, Jim Kass, Vincent de Tourdonnet	Snappy Tales: Short Satirical Musicals	
2004	Kevin Quain	Tequila Vampire Matinee	
2004	Karen Hines	Hello...Hello	
2004	Allen Cole, Vincent de Tourdonnet	Pélagie	
2004	Denis McGrath, Scott White	Top Gun! The Musical	
2005	David Finley	Aladdin	
2005	Guy Mignault	Autour de Kurt Weill	
2006	Shaun McKenna, Matthew Warchus	Lord of the Rings	
2006	David Finley	Snow White and the Group of Seven	
2006	Chris Craddock, Aaron Macri	BoyGroove	
2007	Florence Gibson, Shawn Byfield	i think i can	
2007	Neil Bartram, Brian Hill	The Story of My Life	
2007	Second City Ensemble	Bird Flu Over the Cuckoo's Nest	
2008	Jim LeFrancois, David Oiye	Arthouse Cabaret	
2008	Guy Mignault	Et si on chantait...	
2008	Chris Earle	Peter Pan" The Family Musical	
2008	Juliet Palmer, Anna Chatterton	Stitch	
2008	Lizt Alfonso, Kelly Robinson	VIDA!	
2009	Abigail Richardson, Marjorie Chan	Sanctuary Song	
2009	Alexis Diamond, Abigail Richardson	Opera to Go: The Perfect Screw	
2009	Taylor Graham, William Rowson	Opera to Go: The Virgin Charlie	
2009	Marcia Johnson, Stephen Andrew Taylor	Opera to Go: My Mother's Ring	
2009	James Rolfe, Paul Bentley	Inês	

=== 2010s ===
Year	Playwright	Title	Ref
2010	R. Murray Schafer	The Children's Crusade	
2010	Leslie Arden, The Princess & the Handmaiden		
2010	Allen Cole, Melody Johnson, Rick Roberts	Mimi	
2010	Chris Earle	Robin Hood, The Environmental Family Musical	
2010	Catherine Magowan, Spy Dénommé-Welch	Giiwedin	
2011	Rufus Wainwright	Prima Donna	
2011	Timothy French, Avery Saltzman	To Life	
2011	The Ensemble	(Re)Birth: E.E. Cummings in Song	
2012	Ana Sokolovic	SVADBA - Wedding	
2012	Nicole Brooks	Obeah Opera	
2012	Brian Goldenberg, Anthony Bastianon	Off-Broadway On Stage	
2013	Alice Ping Yee Ho, Marjorie Chan	The Lesson of Da Ji (The Lessons of Love)	
2013	Joseph Aragon	Bloodless: The Trial of Burke and Hare	
2013	Alistair Newton	Of A Monstrous Child: a gaga musical	
2013	Deborah Pearson	A Synonym for Love	
2013	Tom Walmsley, Louis Dufort	Julie Sits Waiting	
2014	Joel Ivany	Figaro's Wedding	
2014	Rob Kempson	The Way Back to Thursday	
2014	John Millard, Michael O'Brien	The Barber of Seville	
2014	Luc Moquin, Claude Naubert	le fa le do	
2015	Mike Ross, Albert Schultz	Spoon River	
2015	Ivan Barbotin, Nicolas Billon, Dean Burry, Nicole Lizée, Hannah Moscovitch, Morris Panych, Benton Roark, James Rolfe, Donna-Michelle St. Bernard, Chris Thornborrow, David Yee	Tapestry Briefs: Booster Shots	
2015	Brian Current, Anton Piatigorsky	Airline Icarus	
2015	Joel Ivany	#UncleJohn	
2016	Marjorie Chan, John Harris	M'dea Undone	
2016	Wesley J. Colford	Heart of Steel	
2016	Sara Farb, Britta Johnson, Bryce Kulak, Erin Shields, Julie Tepperman, Kevin Wong	Reframed	
2016	Anika Johnson, Britta Johnson	Jacob Two-Two Meets the Hooded Fang	
2016	Alan Kliffer	One Night Only: The Greatest Musical Never Written	
2017	David Hein, Irene Sankoff	Come from Away	
2017	Waleed Abdulhamid, John Millard	John & Waleed	
2017	Anna Chatterton, Gareth Williams	Rocking Horse Winner	
2017	Joel Ivany	A Little Too Cozy	
2018	Britta Johnson	Life After	
2018	Aaron Gervais, Colleen Murphy	Oksana G	
2018	Joel Ivany	La Bohème	
2018	Morris Panych, James Rolfe	The Overcoat - A Musical Tailoring	
2018	Wong Teng Chi, Njo Kong Kie	Mr. Shi and His Lover	
2019	Mike Ross, Sarah Wilson	Rose	
2019	Kevin Dyer, Reza Jacobs	Under the Stairs	
2019	Anika Johnson, Britta Johnson	Dr. Silver: A Celebration of Life	

=== 2020s ===
Year	Playwright	Title	Ref
2020	Landon Doak, Matthew Finlan	Life in a Box	
2020	John Millard	The Cave	
2020	Erin Shields, Daniel Große Boymann, Thomas Kahry	Piaf/Dietrich	
2021	Ceremony not held due to the COVID-19 pandemic		
2022	Fatuma Adar	Dixon Road	
2022	Jake Epstein	Boy Falls From the Sky	
2022	Anika Johnson, David Danzon, Matthew O'Connor	Divine Interventions	
2022	Ben Kopp, Margot Greve	Killing Time: A Game Show Musical	
2023	Fiona Sauder, Landon Doak, Victor Pokinko, Matt Pilipiak	Alice in Wonderland	
2023	Frank Cox-O’Connell, Beau Dixon, Hailey Gillis, Marni Jackson, Raha Javanfar, Andrew Penner	The Shape of Home	
2023	Ben Elliott, Fatuma Adar, Suzy Wilde, Rose Napoli, Adam Sakiyama, Kat Sandler	Retold	
2024	Gregory Prest, Mike Ross, Sarah Wilson	De Profundis: Oscar Wilde in Jail	
2024	Britta Johnson, Sara Farb	Kelly v. Kelly	
2024	Scott Joplin, Jessie Montgomery, Jannina Norpoth, Leah-Simone Bowen, Cheryl L. Davis	Scott Joplin's Treemonisha	
2024	Kye Marshall, Amanda Hale	Pomegranate	
2024	Amy Nostbakken, Norah Sadava, Akosua Amo-Adem, Seiko Nakazawa, Stefanie Sourial, Vicky Araico	Universal Child Care	
2025	HAUI x Sean Mayes	Aportia Chryptych: A Black Opera for Portia White	
2025	Julien Bilodeau, Michel Marc Bouchard	La Reine-Garçon	
2025	Lyndsey Bourne and Sam Kaseta	I Was Unbecoming Then	
2025	Matt Murray	The Wizard of Oz: The Toto-ly Aesome Family Musical	
2025	Igor Stravinsky, Titilope Sonuga	Sankofa: The Soldier's Tale Retold	
