= Jake Epstein =

Canadian actor and singer (born 1987)

- Epstein in 2016
- Born: Jacob Lee Epstein; January 16, 1987 (age 39); Toronto, Ontario, Canada
- Occupations: Actor, singer
- Years active: 1999–present
- Spouse: Vanessa Smythe (m. 2018)
- Children: 1
- Mother: Kathy Kacer

Jacob Lee Epstein (born January 16, 1987) is a Canadian actor and singer. He is known for playing Craig Manning, a musician with bipolar disorder, on Degrassi: The Next Generation. He has also had recurring roles in the television series Designated Survivor and The Hardy Boys.

On Broadway, Epstein originated the role of Gerry Goffin in Beautiful: The Carole King Musical. He has also starred as Melchior in the national tour of Spring Awakening and played Will in the national tour of American Idiot.

== Early life ==
Epstein was born in Toronto, Ontario. His mother, Kathy Kacer, is a Norma Fleck Award-winning writer of children's stories about the Holocaust, and his father is a lawyer. He also has an older sister, Gabi, who is an actress and jazz singer.

Epstein is Jewish, and was raised in Conservative Judaism. Epstein stated in 2019, "I would consider myself spiritually Jewish rather than religiously Jewish."

== Career ==
=== Theatre ===
Epstein made his professional stage debut in a production of Our Town, which played at the Royal Alexandra Theatre in 1999. After this, Epstein played the Artful Dodger in a production of Oliver!. The musical played at the Princess of Wales Theatre between November 2, 1999 and January 2, 2000.

In 2009, he starred as C.B. (Charlie Brown) in a Canadian production of Dog Sees God: Confessions of a Teenage Blockhead. Later that year, Epstein joined the first national tour Spring Awakening, where he replaced Kyle Riabko as Melchior Gabor. His first performance with the tour was on July 7, 2009, and stayed with the tour until it ended in 2010.

In July 2011, Epstein joined the original Canadian production of Billy Elliot the Musical. He played the role of Tony Elliot, Billy's older brother, in the production which played at the Canon Theatre in Toronto. After that show closed, Epstein played Will in the first national tour of American Idiot, which began in December 2011. In a 2013 interview, Epstein said that Will was the most challenging role had had ever played. He said, "I sat on a couch and never left the stage for the majority of the show. That experience was a whole lesson in pacing, in creating a whole world for yourself on stage..."

In 2012, Epstein made his Broadway debut in Spider-Man: Turn Off the Dark, which played at the Foxwoods Theatre. He was the alternate for the lead role of Peter Parker/Spider-Man. Epstein referred to the role as a "childhood fantasy come true."

Epstein was cast as Gerry Goffin in Beautiful: The Carole King Musical, opposite Jessie Mueller. The musical had a pre-Broadway engagement at the Curran Theatre in San Francisco, where it played September 24 and October 20, 2013. He then originated the role when it transferred to Broadway, where it began performances at the Stephen Sondheim Theatre on November 12, 2013. Epstein later shared that playing Carole's ex-husband was uniquely challenging because Carole encouraged him to not portray Gerry as the villain, even though the script changes increasingly presented him that way. He left the show in 2014 after a year of performances, citing vocal problems and fatigue of playing a real person being portrayed as brooding and villainous. However, Epstein temporarily returned to the show in 2016, where he reprised his role opposite fellow Canadian actor Chilina Kennedy, who starred as Carole.

In 2016, Epstein starred as a closeted gay man in the off-Broadway show Straight. He said of the script:

"What resonated with me is how a straight person is just a person, but a gay person is a gay person—it's part of the title you give somebody...I thought the whole angle that the play takes about not a fear of coming out but a fear of definition, a fear of being labeled as a gay man, was an argument that's not really made in our sort of post-acceptance society. It's not about a guy who's afraid of coming out..."

At the 2019 Toronto Fringe Festival, Epstein premiered his solo cabaret show Boy Falls From the Sky. The show is a retelling of his experiences in show business, including his time on Degrassi: The Next Generation, the challenges of auditioning for musicals, and his experiences on the ill-fated musical Spider-Man: Turn Off the Dark. Epstein wrote the show at the encouragement of his wife, who he credits with helping him realizing the power and authenticity of "...somebody with a microphone, telling a true story, something that's funny or horrific or whatever..." Mirvish Productions expressed interest in the show, and presented it at the Royal Alexandra Theatre between April 19 and May 29, 2022 and received widespread positive reviews. Epstein has since performed the show across Canada, including in Hamilton, Barrie, and in Quebec at the Segal Centre for Performing Arts.

Epstein will star as Frank Carter in the pre-Broadway engagement of Life After, which will play at the Ed Mirvish Theatre in Toronto between April 16 and May 4, 2025.

=== Television ===
After appearing on the TV show The Zack Files, he played Craig Manning on Degrassi: The Next Generation for five seasons and won the Gemini Award. The character of Craig became a musician on the show and had to cope with parental abuse and bipolar disorder. Epstein said, "At the time, mental illness was not really something anyone was talking about. There was a huge stigma attached — I had never seen [bipolar disorder] on TV, and certainly not in a teenager. I loved the opportunity to portray someone who was conflicted and not perfect..." Craig impregnated a girl named Manny who gets an abortion, and Epstein noted that those episodes were "initially banned" in the United States. Epstein indicated that he "got the chance to really flesh out this guy that felt like a darker extension of me."

He left Degrassi during the fifth season to attend the National Theatre School of Canada in Montreal and made theater his new focus. Epstein said, "One of the things I love about theatre is how raw it is. There's no faking it… I really wanted to have a base in theatre, and that kind of opened up all these doors for me." Epstein returned to Degrassi for minor guest appearances in season 6–8.

Epstein played "geeky FBI computer nerd" Chuck Russink in the American TV show Designated Survivor (2016–2018). It was cancelled by ABC after two seasons, and he was no longer in the show when it was picked up and aired by Netflix for a third season.

== Personal life ==
Epstein married actress Vanessa Smythe in 2018. They welcomed their first child, son Miles August Epstein, on May 25, 2023.

== Theatre credits ==
Year	Production	Role	Theatre	Category	Ref.
1999	Our Town	Joe Crowell	Royal Alexandra Theatre	Soulpepper Theatre / Mirvish Productions	
1999	Oliver!	Artful Dodger	Princess of Wales Theatre	Mirvish Productions	
2008–2009	Cinderella: The Sillylicious Family Musical	Prince George	Elgin Theatre	Ross Petty Productions	
2009	Dog Sees God: Confessions of a Teenage Blockhead	CB	Six Degrees Theatre	Regional: Toronto	
2009–2010	Spring Awakening	Melchior Gabor	First National Tour		
2010–2011	Beauty and the Beast: The Savagely Silly Family Musical	Prince Zack / The Beast	Elgin Theatre	Ross Petty Productions	
2011	Billy Elliot the Musical	Tony Elliot	Canon Theatre	Mirvish Productions	
2011–2012	American Idiot	Will	First National Tour		
2012–2013	Spider-Man: Turn Off the Dark	alt. Peter Parker/Spider-Man	Foxwoods Theatre	Broadway	
2013	Beautiful: The Carole King Musical	Gerry Goffin	Curran Theatre	Pre-Broadway engagement: San Francisco	
2013–2014	Beautiful: The Carole King Musical	Gerry Goffin	Stephen Sondheim Theatre	Broadway	
2016	Straight	Ben	Acorn Theatre	Off-Broadway	
2016–2017	Beautiful: The Carole King Musical	Gerry Goffin	Stephen Sondheim Theatre	Broadway	
2019	Boy Falls From the Sky	Himself	Supermarket Bar	Toronto Fringe Festival	
2019	Dear Jack, Dear Louise	Jack Ludwig	Arena Stage	Washington, D.C.	
2022	Boy Falls From the Sky	Himself	Royal Alexandra Theatre	Mirvish Productions	
2023	Boy Falls From the Sky	Himself	Five Points Theatre	Barrie, Ontario	
2023	Boy Falls From the Sky	Himself	Theatre Aquarius	Hamilton, Ontario	
2023	Boy Falls From the Sky	Himself	Sylvan Adams Theatre	Segal Centre for Performing Arts	
2024	The Last Timbit	Shane	Elgin Theatre		
2025	Life After	Frank Carter	Ed Mirvish Theatre	Pre-Broadway engagement: Toronto	

== Filmography ==
=== Film ===
Key
†	Denotes films that have not yet been released

Year	Film	Role	Notes
2004	Crown Heights	N/A	
2007	Charlie Bartlett	Dustin Lauderbach	
2012	Blood Pressure	Josh Trestman	
2013	Jesse	Jesse Turner	Short film
2015	4th Man Out	Marc Peters	
2015	As I Like Her	Jimmy	Short film
2015	Borealis	Fergus	
2015	Full Out	Coach Pierce	
2016	Zaide	Saul	Short film
2018	Mouthpiece	Danny	
TBA	Both Sides Now †	Eddie	Filming

=== Television ===
Year	Title	Role	Notes
1999	Ricky's Room	Bradley	
1999	Real Kids, Real Adventures	Chris Gilmore	Episode: "Lost & Found: The Richard Prieur Story"
2000	Mom's Got a Date with a Vampire	Duffy	Television movie
2000	Quints	Brad	Television movie
2000–2002	The Zack Files	Cam Dunleavy	Main role
2002–2009	Degrassi: The Next Generation	Craig Manning	Main role (seasons 2–5); guest role (seasons 6–8)
2003	The Eleventh Hour	Jacob McGibbon	Episode: "Shelter"
2003	Girls v. Boys	Himself	Contestant Hawaii
2005	Radio Free Roscoe	Jackson Torrance	Episode: "Musical Influences"
2006	Angela's Eyes	Brad	Episode: "Undercover Eyes"
2007	The Good Witch	Brad	Episodes: "Halloween Prophecy, parts 1 & 2"
2008	Paradise Falls	Jim	Episodes: "Revelations", "Stardust"
2009	Being Erica	Malcolm Abrams	Episode: "Battle Royale"
2009	Degrassi Goes Hollywood	Craig Manning	Teleivision movie
2011	My Babysitter's a Vampire	David Stachowski	Episode: "Blue Moon"
2012	Murdoch Mysteries	Eddie Driscol	Episode: "Murdoch Night in Canada"
2015	Remedy	Jake Ruben	Episodes: "Fight or Flight", "Day One"
2015	Charming Christmas	Woody	Television movie
2016–2017	Degrassi: Next Class	Craig Manning	Episodes: "#ThrowBackThursday", "FactsOnly"
2016–2018	Designated Survivor	Chuck Russink	Main role (season 1-2); 39 episodes
2017–2019	Suits	Brian Altman	Recurring role (seasons 7–9)
2017	Gone	Stephen	Episode: "Ride"
2017	Backstage	Clive Richie	Season 2 Episode 25
2017	Home for the Holidays	Charles Ponzi	Television movie: Christmas special of Murdoch Mysteries
2019	Frankie Drake Mysteries	Bruce Fordham	Episode: "A Brother in Arms"
2019	Mistletoe & Menorahs	Jonathan Silver	Television movie
2019	A Storybook Christmas	Taylor Haldway	Television movie
2020	Star Trek: Discovery	Dr Attis	Episode: "Die Trying"
2020	Christmas at Maple Creek	Carter	Television movie
2021	Eight Gifts of Hanukkah	Daniel Myers	Television movie
2021	Danger Next Door	Ben	Television movie
2022	The Umbrella Academy	Alphonso Hargreeves / Sparrow Number Four	Recurring role (season 3)
2022	Hudson & Rex	Todd Harvey	Episode: "Den of Snakes"
2022–2023	The Hardy Boys	Mr. Adrian Munder	Recurring role (seasons 2–3)
2023	The Wedding Contract	Adam	Television movie
2023	What We Do for Love	Jason Sharpe	Television movie
2023	Laughing All the Way	Mike Baxter	Television movie
2023	Sincerely Truly Christmas	Robert Riley	Television movie
2024	Unwrapping Christmas: Olivia's Reunion	Benjamin Hall	Television movie
2024	Unwrapping Christmas: Mia's Prince	Benjamin Hall	Television movie
2024	Unwrapping Christmas: Lily's Destiny	Benjamin Hall	Television movie
2024	Unwrapping Christmas: Tina's Miracle	Benjamin Hall	Television movie
2024	Mistletoe Murders	Noah Johnson	Season 1 Episodes 5 & 6 "Death of a Humbug" parts 1 & 2
2025	Law & Order Toronto: Criminal Intent	Andrew	Season 2 Episode 7
2025	Oy to the World!	Jake Cohen	Television movie

== Discography ==
- 2008: Music from Degrassi: The Next Generation ("My Window")
- 2009: Degrassi Goes Hollywood: Music from the Original Movie ("Rescue You" and "Swan Song")
- 2014: Beautiful: The Carole King Musical (Original Broadway Cast Recording)

== Awards and nominations ==
Year	Award	Category	Nominated work	Result	Ref.
2001	Young Artist Awards	Best Performance in a TV Movie (Comedy) – Supporting Young Actor	Quints	Nominated	
2003	Young Artist Awards	Best Ensemble in a TV Series (Comedy or Drama)	Degrassi: The Next Generation	Nominated	
2003	Young Artist Awards	Best Performance in a TV Series (Comedy or Drama) – Leadying Young Actor	Degrassi: The Next Generation	Nominated	
2003	Gemini Awards	Best Performance in a Children's or Youth Program or Series	Degrassi: The Next Generation	Won	
2004	Gemini Awards	Best Performance in a Children's or Youth Program or Series	Degrassi: The Next Generation	Nominated	
2004	Young Artist Awards	Best Performance in a TV Series (Comedy or Drama) – Leadying Young Actor	Degrassi: The Next Generation	Nominated	
2005	Young Artist Awards	Outstanding Young Performers in a TV Series	Degrassi: The Next Generation	Nominated	
2006	Young Artist Awards	Best Young Ensemble Performance in a TV Series (Comedy or Drama)	Degrassi: The Next Generation	Nominated	
2018	Hollywood North Film Awards	Best Performance – Canadian Short Film	Okay / The Talk / Zaide / Hypostasis / I Lost My Mind	Nominated	
2022	Dora Mavor Moore Awards	Outstanding New Musical	Boy Falls From the Sky	Nominated	
2022	Dora Mavor Moore Awards	Outstanding Performance in a Leading Role	Boy Falls From the Sky	Nominated	
2025	Dora Mavor Moore Awards	Outstanding Performance by an Individual	Life After	Pending	
