= Vanessa Sears =

Canadian actress

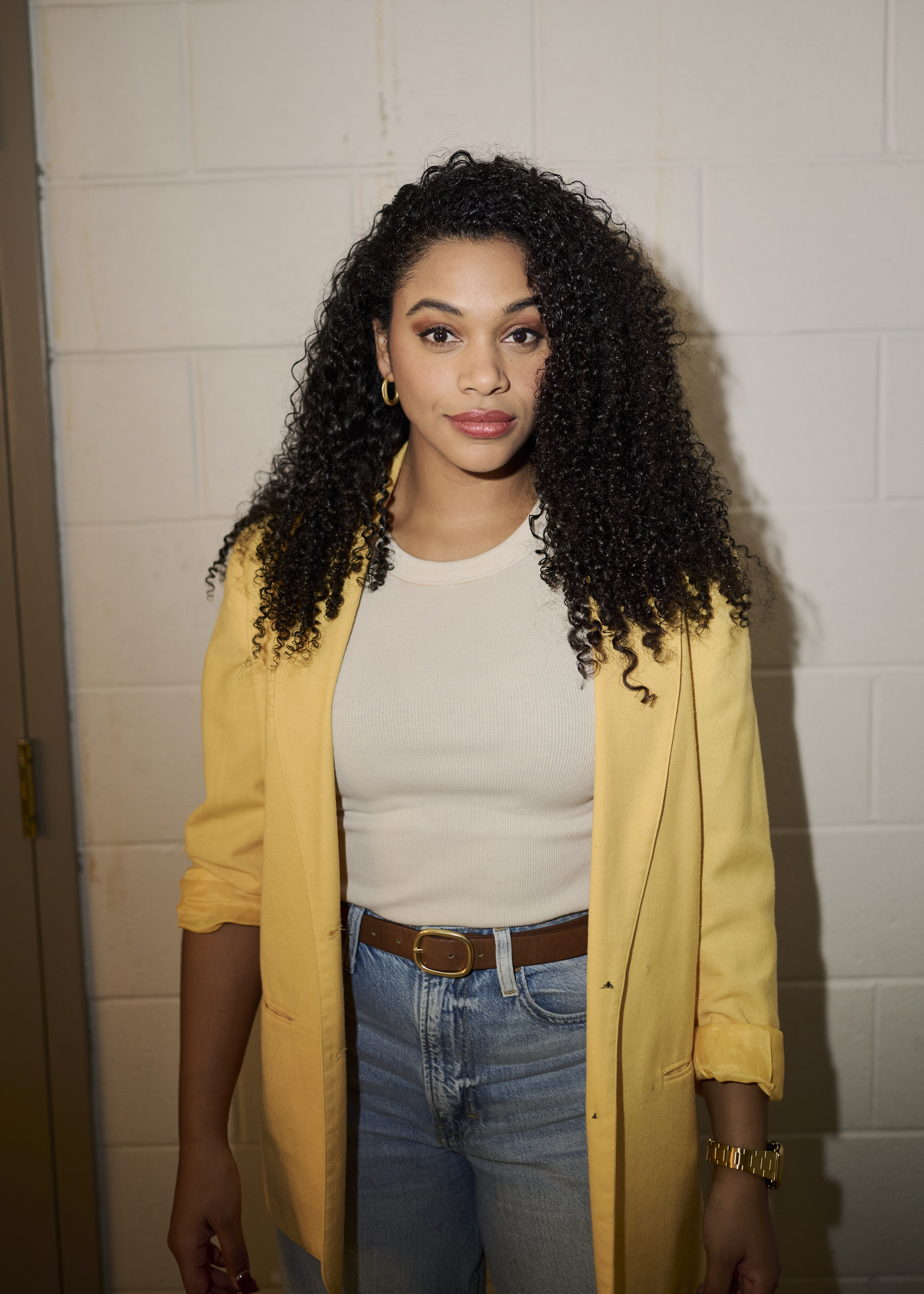
- Born: Deep River, Ontario, Canada
- Education: Sheridan College
- Occupation: Actress
- Years active: 2015–present

Vanessa Sears is a Canadian actress. She originated the role of Nicola in the Canadian premiere production of Kinky Boots, which played at the Royal Alexandra Theatre. In 2022, Sears originated the role of Anaia in the Canadian premiere production of Is God Is, for which she was nominated for a Dora Award for Outstanding Performance in a Leading Role. Sears starred as Juliet in the Canadian production of & Juliet, which played at the Royal Alexandra Theatre.

== Early life ==
Sears was born and raised in Deep River, Ontario. She is of Guyanese and Jamaican heritage, since her father was born in Guyana and her mother was born in Jamaica. She has two brothers and one sister. As a child, Sears contracted flesh-eating disease, where she stayed at the Ronald McDonald House while receiving treatment at the Children's Hospital of Eastern Ontario.

Growing up, Sears performed in community theatre productions of Beauty and the Beast and My Fair Lady. She also performed as an entertainer at Canada's Wonderland. In 2014, Sears advanced to the semi-finals of an international singing competition to become the Voice of McDonald's.

Although she considered pursuing studies to become a veterinarian, Sears decided to pursue musical theatre and graduated from the Honours Bachelor of Music Theatre Performance program at Sheridan College. As of 2023, Sears started studying to also become a musical theatre director.

== Career ==
Shortly after graduating, Sears made her professional stage debut in the Canadian premiere production of Kinky Boots, where she played Nicola. The musical began an open-ended run at the Royal Alexandra Theatre on June 16, 2015, before closing on May 15, 2016.

In 2016, Sears starred as Dorothy in a production of The Wizard of Oz by Young People's Theatre in Toronto, for which she won a Dora Award for Outstanding Performance by an Ensemble in a Musical.

In 2017, Sears played Edwina in a production of Passing Strange, produced by the Musical Stage Company and Obsidian Theatre. For her performance, Sears won the Toronto Theatre Critics Award for Best Supporting Actress in a Musical.

Sears made her Shaw Festival debut in 2017. After appearing in the ensemble of two productions, Sears appeared as Zoe in the Canadian premiere of An Octoroon, which played between July 16 and October 14, 2017.

In 2018, Sears starred as Mary Poppins in the Young People's Theatre production of Mary Poppins, which opened on November 8, 2018, and closed on January 6, 2019. At the 2019 Dora Awards, Sears was nominated in the Outstanding Performance in a Leading Role category for her performance as Mary Poppins.

During the 2019 Stratford Festival season, Sears appeared as Ronnette in their production of Little Shop of Horrors and as Dead Mum in Billy Elliot the Musical.

In 2020, Sears played Emmie Thibodeaux in a production of Caroline, or Change by the Musical Stage Company and Obsidian Theatre. The musical, which starred Jully Black and Measha Brueggergosman, played at the Winter Garden Theatre between January 30 and February 15, 2020. For her performance, Sears won the Dora Award for Outstanding Performance in a Featured Role.

Sears starred as Anaia in the Canadian premiere of the play Is God Is, which was presented by the Canadian Stage Company between May 6–22, 2022. She was nominated for a Dora Award for Outstanding Performance in a Leading Role. Later that year, she played Regan in the world premiere production of Queen Goneril by the Soulpepper Theatre Company, for which she won the Dora Award for Outstanding Performance in a Featured Role. Sears also played Red Queen / Ruby in a regional production of Alice in Wonderland, which earned her a Dora Award nomination for Outstanding Performance in a Leading Role.

In 2022, Sears starred in her first Hallmark movie, 14 Love Letters.

In 2023, Sears made her Broadway debut in New York, New York. She was a standby for the lead role of Francine Evans in the musical, which played at the St. James Theatre between March 24, 2023, and July 30, 2023.

In 2024, Sears returned to Stratford Festival where she will star as Juliet in a production of Romeo and Juliet. Following this, Sears starred as the Witch in a pantomime production of The Wizard of Oz, presented by Ross Petty Productions and the Canadian Stage Company. It played at the Winter Garden Theatre between December 6, 2024, and January 5, 2025.

Sears is currently starring as Juliet in the original Canadian production of & Juliet. The musical began performances at the Royal Alexandra Theatre on December 3, 2025.

== Theatre credits ==
Year	Production	Role	Theatre	Category	Ref.
2015–2016	Kinky Boots	Nicola	Royal Alexandra Theatre	Mirvish Productions	
2016	The Wizard of Oz	Dorothy	Regional: Young People's Theatre		
2016	Million Dollar Quartet	Dyanne	Shoctor Theatre	Citadel Theatre	
2017	Passing Strange	Edwina	The Opera House	Musical Stage Company, Obsidian Theatre	
2017	Me and My Girl	Ensemble	Festival Theatre	Shaw Festival	
2017	1837: The Farmers' Revolt	Ensemble	Court House Theatre	Shaw Festival	
2017	An Octoroon	Zoe	Royal George Theatre	Shaw Festival	
2017	Joseph and the Amazing Technicolor Dreamcoat	Narrator	Regional: Theatre Aquarius		
2018	The Magician's Nephew	Polly	Festival Theatre	Shaw Festival	
2018	Grand Hotel	Flaemmchen	Festival Theatre	Shaw Festival	
2018–2019	Mary Poppins	Mary Poppins	Regional: Young People's Theatre		
2019	Little Shop of Horrors	Ronnette	Avon Theatre	Stratford Festival	
2019	Billy Elliot the Musical	Dead Mum	Festival Theatre	Stratford Festival	
2020	Caroline, or Change	Emmie Thibodeaux	Winter Garden Theatre	Musical Stage Company, Obsidian Theatre	
2022	Is God Is	Anaia	Berkeley Street Theatre	Canadian Stage Company, Obsidian Theatre	
2022	Queen Goneril	Regan	Young Centre for the Performing Arts	World premiere: Soulpepper Theatre Company	
2022	King Lear	Regan	Young Centre for the Performing Arts	Soulpepper Theatre Company	
2022	Alice in Wonderland	Red Queen / Ruby	Young Centre for the Performing Arts	Regional: Bad Hats Theatre	
2023	New York, New York	Francine Evans (standby)	St. James Theatre	Broadway	
2024	Romeo and Juliet	Juliet	Festival Theatre	Stratford Festival	
2024	Twelfth Night	Olivia	Festival Theatre	Stratford Festival	
2024	The Wizard of Oz: A Holiday Musical Panto	Witch	Winter Garden Theatre	Canadian Stage Company / Ross Petty Productions	
2025–2026	& Juliet	Juliet	Royal Alexandra Theatre	Mirvish Productions	

== Filmography ==
=== Television ===
Year	Title	Role	Notes
2016	Suits	Young Jessica	S6.E10: "P.S.L."
2017	The Beaverton	Various characters	S1.E7; S1.E10
2020	Too Close for Christmas	Amy Parker-Barnett	TV movie
2021	TallBoyz	Various characters	4 episodes
2021	Sex/Life	Kyla	S1.E7: "Small Town Saturday Night"
2021	Odd Squad	Reporter #5	S3.E21: "Odd Off the Press"
2021	Y: The Last Man	Steph	S1.E5: "Mann Hunt"
2021	Royally Wrapped for Christmas	Monica	TV movie
2022	14 Love Letters	Kallie	TV movie
2022	My Little Pony: Make Your Mark	Additional voices	Voice role, S2.E1: "Izzy Does It"
2022	Sappy Holiday	Joy Johnson	TV movie
2024	My Little Pony: Tell Your Tale	Sunny's Mom	Voice role, S2.E11: "Written In The Starscouts"

=== Film ===
Year	Title	Role	Notes
2021	Romance in the Wilds	Abi	
2021	Christmas in the Wilds	Abi	

== Awards and nominations ==
Year	Award	Category	Nominated work	Result	Ref.
2015	BroadwayWorld Award	Best Featured Female in a Musical	Kinky Boots	Won	
2016	Dora Awards	Outstanding Performance by an Ensemble	The Wizard of Oz	Won	
2017	Toronto Theatre Critics Award	Best Supporting Actress	Passing Strange	Won	
2019	Dora Awards	Outstanding Performance in a Leading Role	Mary Poppins	Nominated	
2020	Dora Awards	Outstanding Performance in a Featured Role	Caroline, or Change	Won	
2022	Dora Awards	Outstanding Performance in a Leading Role	Is God Is	Nominated	
2023	Dora Awards	Outstanding Performance in a Featured Role	Queen Goneril	Won	
2023	Dora Awards	Outstanding Performance in a Leading Role	Alice in Wonderland	Nominated	
2025	Dora Awards	Outstanding Performance by an Individual in a Play	Shedding a Skin	Pending	
2025	Dora Awards	Outstanding Performance by an Individual in a Musical	The Wizard of Oz: The Toto-ly Awesome Family Musical	Pending	
