= Ross Petty =

Canadian actor and theatre producer (born 1946)

- Born: August 29, 1946 (age 80); Winnipeg, Manitoba, Canada
- Occupations: Actor, producer
- Spouse: Karen Kain

Ross Petty (born August 29, 1946) is a Canadian actor and theatre producer. He is best known for his eponymous production company, which staged what were promoted as "family musical" theatre productions in the British pantomime tradition in Toronto every holiday season from 1996 until 2022. Canadian Stage revived the series in 2024, referring to its production as a "Ross Petty Panto" and crediting him as executive producer emeritus.

== Early career ==
Petty was born in Winnipeg, Manitoba, Canada.

In Europe, he sang at Le Lido in Paris and appeared with Betty Grable in the London West End musical Belle Starr. In the United States, he made his Broadway debut in Arthur Kopit's Wings, created the role of Eddie Dorrance on All My Children, and co-starred with Ginger Rogers and Sid Caesar in a national tour of Cole Porter's Anything Goes.

He appeared in the U.S. and Canada in the title role of Stephen Sondheim's Sweeney Todd, directed by Hal Prince. His film and television credits include Extreme Measures with Gene Hackman and Hugh Grant, Perry Mason, Spenser: For Hire, Monk, Loving Friends and Perfect Couples, Forever Knight, E.N.G., Night Heat, Seeing Things, Hot Shots, All My Children, A Judgement in Stone, Kung Fu: The Legend Continues, Counterstrike, The Secret Adventures of Jules Verne, Traders, F/X2 and Martha Inc: The Martha Stewart Story.

Petty has also done voices in several animated series, including X-Men: The Animated Series, The Busy World of Richard Scarry, Bob and Margaret, Mythic Warriors: Guardians of the Legend, Bad Dog, Redwall, Mischief City, Ned's Newt, Jacob Two-Two, Monster Force, Ace Ventura: Pet Detective, Freaky Stories, Free Willy, Rupert, The Adventures of Tintin, Little Bear, RoboRoach, Birdz, Pippi Longstocking and Rescue Heroes.

== Ross Petty Productions Christmas pantomimes ==
=== History ===
In the early 1980s, pantomimes were staged at the Royal Alexandra Theatre by British producer Paul Elliott, who imported traditional English pantomimes using a primarily British cast complemented by Canadian actors. Petty's first appearance in the pantos was co-starring with his wife, Karen Kain, in Dick Whittington and his Cat in 1984. Petty began co-producing the pantos with Elliott in 1986, and continued until Elliott decided to no longer present the shows in Toronto in 1996.

In 1996, Petty, through his Ross Petty Productions company, began producing what he termed "Fractured Fairy Tale Musicals". These musicals were performed at the Elgin and Winter Garden Theatre in Toronto, during the Christmas season (typically between late November and early January). Petty's productions were based in the old English pantomime tradition, incorporating its broad comedy, winking asides that break the fourth wall, audience participation, and a man wearing a dress. However, Petty dropped the use of the principal boy while retaining the pantomime dame. To modernize his shows, Petty incorporated references to current, local, and/or pop cultural references and often used current popular music. Petty also adapted it to a Canadian audience, writing original scripts, using an all-Canadian cast.

Petty ensured his productions were family-friendly and appropriate for children, even while occasionally incorporating some "adult jokes". Referencing this, Petty commented, "The kids in the audience aren't going to understand those references...they are jokes for the adults." Additionally, Petty instructed his writers to take a feminist approach to the scripts so that characters such as Cinderella and Snow White "aren't just pining after the prince" but are more assertive and independent.

In 2006, Petty revived the 2004 production of Aladdin and embarked on a cross-Canada tour in November and December. The tour starred the same cast, which included former professional wrestler Bret Hart, and had tour stops in Vancouver, Edmonton, Regina, Saskatoon, Calgary, Toronto, and Ottawa.

Between 1996 and 2015, Petty appeared in his shows portraying the villain, who was usually dressed in drag (the pantomime dame). In 2015, Petty retired from performing following the production of Peter Pan, but continued as a producer.

The 2017 production of A Christmas Carol was filmed, and later broadcast on Family Channel and CBC as well as made available for purchase on DVD.

In 2020, Petty's planned production of Aladdin was cancelled because of the COVID-19 pandemic. Instead, There's No Place Like Home For The Holidays was performed as an online revue. This allowed audiences to watch the show from home while still incorporating music, dance, comedy, and audience interaction. Petty's 2021 production, Alice in Winterland, was similarly presented online that allowed audiences to watch from home.

Petty announced that the 2022 show Peter's Final Flight: The Pan-Tastical Family Musical would be the company's final production, with Petty reprising his role as a villain for the final production.

==== Revival ====
In March 2024, it was announced that the Canadian Stage Company will be reviving Petty's annual family panto productions. The first production will be The Wizard of Oz, which will play at the Winter Garden Theatre between December 2024 and January 2025. Petty is executive producer emeritus of the revived series.

In December 2024, Canadian Stage announced that its 2025-2026 panto would be Robin Hood, scheduled for 45 performances at the Winter Garden.

=== Reception ===
Many of Petty's productions were well received by Toronto theatre critics, and many of his shows performed to sell-out audiences.

Petty's productions have received praise for introducing theatre to children at a young age, with many noting that there was a lack of family-friendly theatre in the Toronto area. Toronto theatre critic J. Kelly Nestruck wrote that Petty's annual holiday pantos were one of the few options for family-friendly live entertainment in Toronto, with shows that contained comedy for both children and adults. Joshua Chong of the Toronto Star similarly referred to Petty's shows as being one of the few shows in Toronto where "...the whole family can have fun."

Petty has also been praised for his inclusion of drag performers in many of his shows. Petty's villainous characters were usually dressed in drag and Dan Chameroy's recurring "Plumbum" character was a comedic feminine-presenting character. Petty and his writers took care to ensure that "Plumbum" was presented with a sense of honesty and vulnerability.

However, Petty's productions have been criticized for their commercialism through product placement, as his shows project ads on a screen from their corporate sponsors during breaks in the show. Petty defended this decision, indicating that his shows would not be financially viable without commercial sponsorship. Since Petty's productions were for-profit, they were not eligible for government funding and had to rely on corporate sponsors to help subsidize the shows.

Petty's productions have been criticized for their lack of racial diversity in casting. In 2014, Toronto theatre critic J. Kelly Nestruck felt the all-white casts were not reflective of Toronto's growing diversity and multiculturalism. In 2019, Toronto actor Kevin Vidal also criticized Petty for the lack of racial diversity in his shows. In 2020, Petty issued an apology. He acknowledged the importance of ensuring more racially diverse casts and the importance of doing so for children in their audiences, and also pledged to create more inclusive casting processes.

=== Production history ===
==== Ross Petty Productions ====
Year	Show title	Cast	Ref.
1996	Robin Hood	Ross Petty, Karen Kain, Frank Augustyn	
1997	Jack and the Beanstalk	Ross Petty, Camilla Scott, Heath Lamberts, Jeff Hyslop	
1998	Aladdin	Ross Petty, Camilla Scott, Barry MacGregor, Ernie Coombs	
1999	Cinderella	Laura Bertram, Laird Mackintosh, Michael Lamport, William Vickers, Juan Chioran	
2000	Peter Pan	Ross Petty, Sheila McCarthy, Ernie Coombs, Robert McCarrol, Jayne Lewis	
2001	Snow White	Ross Petty, Graham Abbey, Melissa Thomson, Edward Glen, Allan Redford, Fred Penner, Peter Deiwick	
2002	Robin Hood	Ross Petty, Graham Abbey, Amy Walsh, Nora McLellan, Rex Harrington, Paul Alexander Nolan, Sara Topham, Simon Bradbury	
2003	Cinderella	Ross Petty, Jennifer Gould, Adam Brazier, Don Harron, Erin Davis, Mary Ellen Mahoney, Paul Alexander Nolan, Cliff Saunders, Jonathan Wilson	
2004	Aladdin	Ross Petty, Bret Hart, Jamie McKnight, Jennifer Dale, Derek McGrath	
2005	Snow White	Ross Petty, Elena Juatco, Ryan Malcolm, Gary Beals, Billy Klippert, Sean Cullen, Alan Frew	
2006	Aladdin	Ross Petty, Bret Hart, Jamie McKnight, Jennifer Dale, Derek McGrath	
2007	Peter Pan	Ross Petty, Kurt Browning, Jennifer Waiser, Eddie Glen, Meghan Hoople, Brandon Banks	
2008	Cinderella	Ross Petty, Jake Epstein, Paula Brancati, Patty Sullivan, Adam Brazier, Dan Chameroy, Eddie Glen	
2009	Robin Hood	Ross Petty, Eva Avila, Yvan Pedneault, Dan Chameroy, Jessica Holmes, Jeff Irving	
2010	Beauty and the Beast	Ross Petty, Jake Epstein, Melissa O'Neil, Scott Thompson, Eddie Glen, Jake Simons, Lisa Lennox, Meghan Hoople	
2011	Wizard of Oz	Ross Petty, Elicia MacKenzie, Yvan Pedneault, Dan Chameroy, Jessica Holmes, Eddie Glen, Kyle Blair, Steve Ross	
2012	Snow White	Ross Petty, Graham Abbey, Melissa O'Neil, Bryn McAuley, David Cotton, Eddie Glen, Billy Lake, Reid Janisse	
2013	The Little Mermaid	Ross Petty, Chilina Kennedy, Dan Chameroy, Jordan Clark, Eddie Glen, Marc Devigne, Reid Janisse	
2014	Cinderella	Ross Petty, Danielle Wade, Dan Chameroy, Eddie Glen, Bryn McAuley, Cleopatra Williams, Jeff Lillico, Reid Janisse	
2015	Peter Pan	Ross Petty, Anthony MacPherson, Steffi DiDomenicantonio, Eddie Glen, Jessica Holmes, Dan Chameroy	
2016	Sleeping Beauty	AJ Bridel, Hilary Farr, James Daly, Paul Constable, Eddie Glen, Taveeta Szymanowicz, Alexandra Beaton, Lisa Horner, Laurie Murdoch	
2017	A Christmas Carol	AJ Bridel, Cyrus Lane, Dan Chameroy, Eddie Glen, Kyle Golemba	
2018	Wizard of Oz	Camille Eanga-Selenge, Eddie Glen, Sara-Jeanne Hosie, Michael De Rose, Eric Craig, Matt Nethersole, Daniel Williston	
2019	Lil' Red Robin Hood	AJ Bridel, Eddie Glen, Robert Markus, Sara-Jeanne Hosie, Lawrence Libor, Daniel Williston	
2020	There's No Place Like Home For The Holidays ^{a}	Camille Eanga-Selenge, Dan Chameroy, Eddie Glen, AJ Bridel, Sara-Jeanne Hosie, Alex Wierzbicki, Roberta Battaglia	
2021	Alice in Winterland ^{b}	Kimberly-Ann Truong, Dan Chameroy, Eddie Glen, Sara-Jeanne Hosie, Thom Allison	
2022	Peter's Final Flight: The Pan-Tastical Family Musical	Dan Chameroy, Eddie Glen, Sara-Jeanne Hosie, Alex Wierzbicki, Stephanie Sy, Ross Petty	

==== Canadian Stage productions ====
(Ross Petty, executive producer emeritus)

Year	Show title	Cast	Ref.
2024	The Wizard of Oz ^{c}	Julia Pulo, Vanessa Sears, Dan Chameroy, Eddie Glen, Jonathan Cullen, Saphire Demitro	
2025	Robin Hood: A Very Merry Family Musical	Julia Pulo, Daniel Williston, Damien Atkins, Praneet Akilla, Eddie Glen, Julius Sermonia, Malinda Carroll, Jean-Paul Parker, Kyle Brown, Cara Hunter, Joedan Bell, Sierra Holder	
2026	Cinderella	Stephanie Sy, Jordan Bell, Andrew Broderick, James Daly, Izad Etemadi, Sierra Holder, Hailey Lewis, Andrew McAllister, Kristen Peace, Kirstyn Russelle, Mitch Wood, Shawn Wright	

- ^a The 2020 production was a revue performed online due to the COVID-19 pandemic
- ^b The 2021 production was performed virtually due to pandemic restrictions.
- ^c This is the first production that marks the revival of the annual pantos being produced by Canadian Stage Company. Ross Petty is credited as Executive Producer Emeritus

== Personal life ==
Petty has been married to former National Ballet of Canada dancer and artistic director Karen Kain since 1983. The couple reside in Toronto.

== Filmography ==
Ross Petty film and television credits
Year	Title	Role	Notes
1978	All My Children	Eddie Dorance #2	
1983	Loving Friends and Perfect Couples	Unknown	1 episode
1985–1986	Seeing Things	Mensoff / Curtis	2 episodes
1986	A Judgement in Stone	George Coverdale	Theatrical film
1986	Spearfield's Daughter	Roger Brisson	Miniseries
1986	Hot Shots	Mr. Fitzer	1 episode
1986	Perry Mason: The Case of the Shooting Star	Peter Towne	Television film
1987	Night Heat	Thomas Penman	1 episode
1990	Counterstrike	Dean Banks	Episode: "A Little Purity"
1991	F/X2	Consigliere	Theatrical film
1992	Counterstrike	James	Episode: "The Circus Ring"
1992–1997	X-Men: The Animated Series	Ape, additional voices	16 episodes
1993	E.N.G.	Dr. Calvini	1 episode
1993–1997	The Busy World of Richard Scarry	(voice)	36 episodes
1994	Forever Knight	Draper	1 episode
1994	Monster Force	(various)	13 episodes
1996	Kung Fu: The Legend Continues	Tom Cameron	1 episode
1996	Extreme Measures	Dr. Garlock	Theatrical film
1998–1999	Mythic Warriors	King Pelias (voice)	3 episodes
1999	Traders	Unknown	1 episode
2000	The Secret Adventures of Jules Verne	Baron Von Bresiau	1 episode
2002	Monk	Henry Rutherford	1 episode
2003	Martha Inc: The Martha Stewart Story	Unknown	Television film
