= Sara Farb =

Canadian actress, playwright, and singer (born 1987)

- Born: 1987 (age 38–39)
- Education: University of Toronto (BA)
- Occupations: Actress, playwright, singer
- Years active: 1996–present

Sara Farb (born 1987) is a Canadian actress, playwright, and singer.

She originated the role of Delphi Diggory in the Canadian premiere production of Harry Potter and the Cursed Child, which played at the Ed Mirvish Theatre between May 2022 and July 2023.

== Early life ==
Farb grew up in Toronto, Ontario, and has a younger sister, Rebecca. She is of Lithuanian-Jewish heritage, and her grandmother and great-grandmother were Holocaust survivors who endured the Stutthof concentration camp.

She attended Earl Haig Secondary School, where she was involved in the school's drama program and in various social climate initiatives. Farb has a degree in English literature from the University of Toronto. Although she was interested in pursuing acting, Farb experienced difficulty getting cast in projects that interested her. This led to her taking a copywriting course at George Brown College while performing in small theatre gigs across Toronto.

== Career ==
At nine years old, Farb made her stage debut as Young Jane Eyre in the world premiere production of Jane Eyre. The musical opened at the Royal Alexandra Theatre in Toronto on December 3, 1996, and closed on February 1, 1997.

Farb made her Stratford Festival debut in 2013, where she was a member of the ensemble in that season's production of Romeo and Juliet. Between 2013 and 2017, Farb appeared in eight other Stratford Festival productions. In 2015, she starred as Cordelia in Stratford's production of King Lear opposite Colm Feore, which was filmed by CBC and later had a limited theatrical release throughout Canada. In 2017, Farb starred as Juliet in Romeo and Juliet which was also professionally filmed and had a limited theatrical release across Canada.

In 2015, Farb performed her one-woman play, R-E-B-E-C-C-A, at the Theatre Passe Muraille. It is a story about her younger sister and the challenges of growing up with a developmental disability.

Farb also starred as Anne Frank in a production of The Secret Annex, a play that hypothesizes what would have happened if Anne survived World War II. The play was performed at the Segal Centre for Performing Arts in February 2016.

In 2016, the Art Gallery of Ontario partnered with The Musical Stage Company and Acting Up Stage Company to present three short musicals based on art exhibits on display at the museum. Farb and Britta Johnson chose He Is Coming by Otto Willem Albertus Roelofs, which was performed in April 2016.

Farb starred as Medium Allison in a Canadian production of Fun Home. The musical played at the CAA Theatre between April 13 and May 16, 2018. At the 2018 Dora Awards, Farb was nominated for Outstanding Female Performance in a Musical.

In 2019, Farb made her Broadway debut in Harry Potter and the Cursed Child, where she played Delphi Diggory. In 2022, Farb reprised her role of Delphi Diggory in the Canadian premiere production of Harry Potter and the Cursed Child. The play began performances at the Ed Mirvish Theatre in Toronto on May 31, 2022, and closed on July 2, 2023.

Farb again collaborated with Johnson, when they co-created the musical Kelly v. Kelly. The musical had its world premiere at the Berkeley Street Theatre in Toronto, where it played between May 26 and June 18, 2023. At the 2024 Dora Awards, it was nominated for six awards including Outstanding New Musical and Outstanding Musical Theatre Production.

== Theatre credits ==
=== As performer ===
Year	Production	Role	Theatre	Category	Ref.
1996–1997	Jane Eyre	Young Jane Eyre	Royal Alexandra Theatre	World premiere: Toronto / Mirvish Productions	
2013	Romeo and Juliet	Ensemble, understudy Juliet	Festival Theatre	Stratford Festival	
2013	The Merchant of Venice	Jessica	Festival Theatre	Stratford Festival	
2013	The Three Musketeers	Dona Estefania	Festival Theatre	Stratford Festival	
2014	King Lear	Cordelia	Festival Theatre	Stratford Festival	
2014	The Beaux' Stratagem	Cherry	Festival Theatre	Stratford Festival	
2015	R-E-B-E-C-C-A	Herself	Regional / Theatre Passe Muraille		
2015	The Diary of Anne Frank	Anne Frank	Avon Theatre	Stratford Festival	
2015	She Stoops to Conquer	Miss Constance Neville	Avon Theatre	Stratford Festival	
2015	The Last Wife	Mary	Studio Theatre	Stratford Festival	
2016	The Secret Annex	Anne Frank	Segal Centre for Performing Arts		
2016	A Little Night Music	Petra	Avon Theatre	Stratford Festival	
2016	The Lion, the Witch and the Wardrobe	Lucy	Avon Theatre	Stratford Festival	
2017	The Last Wife	Mary	Arts Baillie Theatre	Regional / Soulpepper Theatre Company	
2017	Romeo and Juliet	Juliet	Festival Theatre	Stratford Festival	
2018	The Humans	Brigid	Bluma Appel Theatre	Toronto / Canadian Stage	
2018	Fun Home	Medium Alison	CAA Theatre	Toronto / Mirvish Productions	
2019–2020	Harry Potter and the Cursed Child	Delphi Diggory	Lyric Theatre	Broadway	
2021	Finally There's Sun	Herself	Festival Theatre Canopy	Stratford Festival	
2022	Light	Willow	Tarragon Theatre	Regional / Toronto	
2022–2023	Harry Potter and the Cursed Child	Delphi Diggory	Ed Mirvish Theatre	Toronto / Mirvish Productions	
2024	The Last Timbit	Chloe	Elgin Theatre	Regional / Toronto	
2025	As You Like It	Rosalind	Festival Theatre	Stratford Festival	
2025	Sense and Sensibility	Fanny Dashwood/Lady Middleton	Festival Theatre	Stratford Festival	Stratford Festival
2025	Dangerous Liaisons	Emilie	Festival Theatre	Stratford Festival	Stratford Festival

=== As creative ===
Year	Title	Music	Lyrics	Book	Notes	Ref.
2015	R-E-B-E-C-C-A	—N/a	—N/a	Sara Farb	Also performer	
2016	Reframed: He Is Coming	Britta Johnson		Sara Farb		
2023	Kelly v. Kelly	Britta Johnson		Sara Farb		
2026	Way Out There	Anton Lipovetsky		Sara Farb		

== Filmography ==
=== Television ===
Year	Title	Role	Notes
2003	Radio Free Roscoe	Jennifer Peoples	S1.E7: "Political in Pink"
2004	Crown Heights	Devorah Lazerson	TV movie
2006	Instant Star	Girl Fan	S2.E13: "Date with the Night"
2006	11 Cameras	Nicole	2 episodes: S1.E1, S1.E22
2006	Life with Derek	Poetry Girl	S2.E7: "Crushing the Coach"
2008	Céline	Daughter #6	TV movie
2010–2011	Covert Affairs	Barista	2 episodes: S1.E4: "No Quarter", S2.E5: "Around the Sun"
2011	The Listener	Computer Nerd Girl	S2.E9: "Jericho"
2012	The Firm	Female Clerk	S1.E20: "Chapter Twenty"
2017	Murdoch Mysteries	Emily Dobbs	S10.E18: "Hell to Pay"
2021	Frankie Drake Mysteries	Henrietta Collins	S4.E7: "Life Is a Cabaret"
2021	Nurses	Jonie	S2.E5: "Code Orange"
2021	Departure	Beth	2 episodes: S2.E1: "Runaway", S2.E2: "Fugitive"
2024	Hudson & Rex	Wanda Loring	S6.E16: "Rex, Drugs, and Rock 'n' Roll"

=== Film ===
Year	Title	Role	Notes
2015	King Lear	Cordelia	
2018	Romeo and Juliet	Juliet	

== Awards and nominations ==
In 2023, the Playwrights Guild of Canada awarded Farb and Britta Johnson the Playwrights Guild Musical Award for creating Kelly v. Kelly.

Year	Award	Category	Nominated work	Result	Ref.
2018	Dora Awards	Outstanding Female Performance in a Musical	Fun Home	Nominated	
2024	Dora Awards	Outstanding Musical Theatre Production	Kelly v. Kelly	Nominated	
2024	Dora Awards	Outstanding New Musical	Kelly v. Kelly	Nominated	
