= Life After (musical) =

2016 musical

- 2025 poster
- Music: Britta Johnson
- Lyrics: Britta Johnson
- Book: Britta Johnson
- Premiere: July 1, 2016: Theatre Passe Muraille, Toronto
- Productions: 2017 Toronto; 2019 San Diego; 2022 Chicago; 2025 Toronto

Life After is a musical with music, lyrics, and book by Britta Johnson. Loosely inspired by Johnson's real-life experiences, the musical focuses on sixteen-year-old Alice Carter, who has to navigate life after the death of her father.

== Premise ==
The musical follows the story of Alice Carter, a teenage girl who is confronted with the unexpected death of her father, Frank Carter, a charismatic self-help author. As Alice attempts to understand her father's life and reconcile her feelings of anger, guilt, and sorrow, she is joined and supported by her mother Beth, her sister Kate, best friend Hannah, and her English teacher Ms. Hopkins. Alice slowly uncovers layers of her father's past that challenge her initial perceptions, leading her on a journey of self-discovery and acceptance.

== Development ==
Johnson began to write the songs for the musical based on the grief she was experiencing after the death of her father. When she was 18, Johnson further developed the concept for the musical as a playwright-in-residence at the Paprika Festival in Toronto. After she first performed the musical at the 2016 Toronto Fringe Festival, the musical caught the attention of Yonge Street Theatricals as well as Toronto-based theatre companies The Musical Stage Company and Canadian Stage Company. Johnson then further developed and expanded Life After into a full-length musical as part of a residency with The Musical Stage Company.

== Production history ==
=== World premiere: Toronto ===
Life After was first presented as part of the 2016 Toronto Fringe Festival. The musical was performed at the Theatre Passe Muraille from July 1–10, 2016. It won the Paul O’Sullivan Prize for Musical Theatre, awarded to the best script, as well as the Patron's Pick for musical theatre.

Following this success, it was developed into a full musical with The Musical Stage Company and the Canadian Stage Company, in Toronto. It began performances at the Berkeley Street Theatre on September 23, 2017, and was supposed to close on October 22, 2017. However, due to popular demand, the musical was extended by one week until October 29, 2017. This production was nominated for 12 Dora Awards, winning 6, including Best Musical Theatre Production and Best New Musical.

=== San Diego (2019) ===
The musical received its American premiere at The Old Globe Theatre in San Diego. It began performances on March 22, 2019, before closing on April 28, 2019. The musical starred Sophie Hearn as Alice Carter and Bradley Dean as Frank Carter, and was directed by Barry Edelstein.

Shortly after the San Diego production closed, it was announced that the musical would transfer to the Arena Stage in Washington, D.C. It was scheduled to open in August 2021, however it was cancelled due to the COVID-19 pandemic.

=== Chicago (2022) ===
Life After then played at the Goodman Theatre in Chicago. Performances began on June 11, 2022, and it closed on July 17, 2022. The production was further developed, and included an expanded set and new direction by Annie Tippe. It starred Samantha Williams as Alice Carter and Paul Alexander Nolan as Frank Carter.

=== Toronto (2025) ===
Life After returned to Toronto, where it played at the Ed Mirvish Theatre. The production began performances on April 16, 2025 and closed on May 10, 2025. The pre-Broadway engagement starred Isabella Esler as Alice Carter and Jake Epstein as Frank Carter.

== Cast and characters ==
Role	Toronto	San Diego	Chicago	Toronto
Role	2017	2019	2022	2025
Alice Carter	Ellen Denny	Sophie Hearn	Samantha Williams	Isabella Esler
Frank Carter	Dan Chameroy	Bradley Dean	Paul Alexander Nolan	Jake Epstein
Kate Carter	Rielle Braid	Charlotte Maltby	Skyler Volpe	Valeria Ceballos
Hannah	Kelsey Verzotti	Livvy Marcus	Lucy Panush	Julia Pulo
Beth Carter	Tracy Michailidis	Mamie Parris	Bryonha Marie Parham	Mariand Torres
Ms. Hopkins	Trish Lindström	Dan’yelle Williamson	Jen Sese	Chilina Kennedy
The Furies	Neema Bickersteth; Barbara Fulton; Anika Johnson	Ximone Rose; Mackenzie Warren; Charlotte Mary Wen	Ashley Pérez Flanagan; Lauryn Hobbs; Chelsea Williams	Kaylee Harwood; Arinea Hermans; Zöe O'Connor

== Musical numbers ==
- "Frank's Message #1" – Frank
- "Alice Finds Out" – Beth, Kate, Hannah, Furies
- "The Funeral" – Beth, Kate, Hannah, Ms. Hopkins, Frank, Furies
- "If I Knew" – Alice, Furies
- "Impromptu Debate" – Alice, Frank
- "Control What You Can" – Kate, Alice, Beth, Frank
- "Dedication #1" – Beth, Furies
- "Route 33" – Frank
- "The Party" – Hannah, Frank, Alice, Furies
- "Route 33 (reprise) / Beth and Kate at Home" – Frank, Alice, Beth, Kate
- "Maybe it's Your Fault" – Kate, Alice, Furies
- "Back at School" – Furies
- "Forgive Yourself" – Ms. Hopkins, Frank, Beth, Kate, Alice, Furies
- "Frank's Message #2" – Frank
- "Dedication #2" – Beth, Furies
- "A Moment" – Kate, Alice, Beth, Frank, Ms. Hopkins, Furies
- "Frank on the Porch" – Frank, Furies
- "Moving" – Ms. Hopkins
- "Wallpaper" – Beth
- "Will I Grow?" – Alice, Furies
- "Snow" – Alice, Frank
- "Poetry" – Alice

== Critical reception ==
The 2017 world premiere production in Toronto received widespread critical acclaim.

Carly Maga of the Toronto Star praised Johnson's ability to portray the "overwhelming, surreal nature of grief", and commented that the musical's emotions rivaled that of more traditional, full-length plays. Taylor Long, writing for BroadwayWorld, said that the show is "musical theatre perfection" and that "the quality of the orchestra, especially with Reza Jacobs shaping the music, rivals anything you hear on Broadway." J. Kelly Nestruck of The Globe and Mail similarly praised the musical, comparing it favorably to similarly themed musicals such as Next to Normal and Dear Evan Hansen.

Reviewing the 2019 San Diego production for The San Diego Union-Tribune, James Hebert called the show a "luminous new musical" and praised Johnson's songwriting and storytelling, the cast's performances, as well as the musical orchestrations.

== Awards and nominations ==
Year	Award	Category	Nominee	Result	Ref.
2018	Dora Awards	Outstanding Musical Theatre Production		Won	
2018	Dora Awards	Outstanding New Musical		Won	
2018	Dora Awards	Outstanding Direction	Robert McQueen	Won	
2018	Dora Awards	Outstanding Musical Direction	Lynne Shankel & Reza Jacobs	Won	
2018	Dora Awards	Outstanding Choreography	Linda Garneau	Nominated	
2018	Dora Awards	Outstanding Performance (Male)	Dan Chameroy	Nominated	
2018	Dora Awards	Outstanding Performance (Female)	Tracy Michalidis	Won	
2018	Dora Awards	Outstanding Performance (Female)	Ellen Denny	Nominated	
2018	Dora Awards	Outstanding Ensemble Performance		Won	
2018	Dora Awards	Outstanding Scenic Design	Brandon Kleinman	Nominated	
2018	Dora Awards	Outstanding Costume Design	Ming Wong	Nominated	
2018	Dora Awards	Outstanding Lighting Design	Kimberly Purtell	Nominated	
2019	San Diego Theatre Critics Circle Awards	Outstanding Musical		Nominated	
2019	San Diego Theatre Critics Circle Awards	Outstanding Lead Performance in a Musical	Sophie Hearn	Won	
2019	San Diego Theatre Critics Circle Awards	Outstanding Direction of a Musical	Barry Edelstein	Won	
2019	San Diego Theatre Critics Circle Awards	Outstanding Scenic Design	Neil Patel	Nominated	
2019	San Diego Theatre Critics Circle Awards	Outstanding Lighting Design	Japhy Weideman	Won	
2019	San Diego Theatre Critics Circle Awards	Outstanding Projection Design	Sven Ortel	Nominated	
2022	Joseph Jefferson Awards	Outstanding Musical Production		Nominated	
2022	Joseph Jefferson Awards	Outstanding Performer in a Supporting Role - Musical	Bryonha Marie Parham	Nominated	
2022	Joseph Jefferson Awards	Outstanding Direction of a Musical	Annie Tippe	Won	
2022	Joseph Jefferson Awards	Outstanding Lighting Design	Yi Zhao	Nominated	
2025	Dora Awards	Outstanding Musical Theatre Production		Pending	
2025	Dora Awards	Outstanding Performance by an Individual	Isabella Esler	Pending	
2025	Dora Awards	Outstanding Performance by an Individual	Jake Epstein	Pending	
2025	Dora Awards	Outstanding Performance by an Individual	Julia Pulo	Pending	
2025	Dora Awards	Outstanding Performance by an Individual	Mariand Torres	Pending	
2025	Dora Awards	Outstanding Performance by an Ensemble	Kaylee Harwood, Arinea Hermans, and Zoe O'Connor	Pending	
2025	Dora Awards	Outstanding Creative Direction	Annie Tippe (Director), Ann Yee (Choreographer), Lynne Shankel (Music Orchestrations), Chris Kong (Music Director)	Pending	
2025	Dora Awards	Outstanding Achievement in Design	Kai Harada and Haley Parcher (Sound Design)	Pending	
2025	Dora Awards	Outstanding Achievement in Design	Todd Rosenthal (Set Design)	Pending	
