= Julia Pulo =

Canadian actress and singer (born 2001)

- Born: May 16, 2001 (age 25); Mississauga, Ontario, Canada
- Education: Sheridan College
- Occupations: Actress, singer
- Years active: 2016–present

Julia Pulo (born May 16, 2001) is a Canadian actress and singer, who originated the role of Anne Boleyn in the Canadian premiere production of SIX.

== Early life and education ==
Pulo was born and raised in Mississauga. At nine years old, Pulo received the David Bloom Award, awarded by the Brampton Arts Council, for her portrayal of Annie in a regional production of Annie. In 2013, Pulo finished in third place in the musical theatre division for participants aged 12 and under, in a worldwide music competition supported by Hal Leonard.

She attended St. Joan of Arc Catholic Secondary School, where she starred in productions of 25th Annual Putnam County Spelling Bee, West Side Story, and Cinderella. Following this, Pulo graduated from the Honours Bachelor of Music Theatre Performance program at Sheridan College.

== Career ==
In 2016, Pulo starred as Iris in the comedy drama film Operation Christmas List, alongside Colton Gobbo.

During the COVID-19 pandemic, Canadian vocal coach Juliet Forrester and director Marion Abbott produced an online virtual Christmas concert that featured a variety of performers from across Canada. During the online concert, Pulo and her sister performed a cover of The Man With The Bag.

In July 2022, Pulo made her professional theatre debut in a regional production of Ride the Cyclone.

In September 2022, Pulo was announced as the host of Tummy Tales, a live-action segment of the Netflix revival of the children's television series Teletubbies narrated by Tituss Burgess. In her role, Pulo sings a song and interacts with various young children.

On June 6, 2023, it was announced that Pulo would star as Anne Boleyn in the Canadian premiere production of SIX. The musical premiered at the Citadel Theatre in Edmonton, where it played between August 12, 2023, and September 14, 2023. It then transferred to the Royal Alexandra Theatre in Toronto, where it began an open-ended run on September 23, 2023.

Pulo starred as Dorothy in a pantomime production of The Wizard of Oz, presented by Ross Petty Productions and the Canadian Stage Company. It played at the Winter Garden Theatre between December 6, 2024, and January 5, 2025. Pulo's performance as Dorothy received critical praise, with Glenn Sumi of the Toronto Star calling Pulo "one of the most distinctive new talents in musical theatre".

Pulo played Hannah in the pre-Broadway engagement of Life After, which played at the Ed Mirvish Theatre in Toronto between April 16 and May 4, 2025. For her performance, Pulo was nominated for Outstanding Performance by an Individual at the 2025 Dora Awards.

== Filmography ==
Year(s)	Title	Role	Notes
2016	Operation Christmas List	Iris	
2016	Super Detention	Lunam	
2018	Santa's Castle	Kilter (voice)	Television film
2020	Christmas at Home: An Online Christmas Concert	Herself	Online concert
2022	Teletubbies	Julia	Host, Tummy Tales
2023–2024	Bakugan	Juno Reyes (voice)	Main role

== Theatre credits ==
Year(s)	Production	Role	Location	Notes	Ref.
2017	Fiddler on the Roof	Chava	Globe Productions	Regional	
2018	Little Shop of Horrors	Chiffon	BurlOak Theatre	Regional	
2022	Ride the Cyclone	Constance	Marble Arts Centre; Bancroft Village Playhouse	Regional, Tweed & Company Theatre	
2023	Rooted: A Musical Poem	Girl	The Musical Stage Company	Workshop	
2023–2024	Six: The Musical	Anne Boleyn	Citadel Theatre	Canadian production / Mirvish Productions	
2023–2024	Six: The Musical	Anne Boleyn	Royal Alexandra Theatre	Canadian production / Mirvish Productions	
2024	The Wizard of Oz: The Toto-ly Awesome Family Musical	Dorothy	Winter Garden Theatre	Canadian Stage Company / Ross Petty Productions	
2025	Frozen	Ensemble, u/s Anna	Citadel Theatre		
2025	Life After	Hannah	Ed Mirvish Theatre	Pre-Broadway engagement: Toronto	

== Awards and nominations ==
Year	Award	Category	Nominated work	Result	Ref.
2025	Dora Awards	Outstanding Performance by an Individual	Life After	Nominated	
2025	Dora Awards	Outstanding Performance by an Individual	The Wizard of Oz: The Toto-ly Awesome Family Musical	Nominated	
