= Matthew Jocelyn =

Canadian theatre director

Matthew Jocelyn (born 1958) is the former artistic and general director of Canadian Stage, a not-for-profit theatre in Toronto, Ontario, Canada. Prior to his appointment at Canadian Stage, Jocelyn was the artistic and general director of the Atelier du Rhin in Alsace, France for 10 years. He was named Chevalier des Art et des Lettres (Knight of the Order of Arts and Letters), by the French Ministry of Culture in July 2008.

== Career ==
Jocelyn has worked as a theatre and opera director, arts administrator, producer, opera librettist, and translator.

Born in Canada, he studied at Mount Allison University, l'Université d'Aix-Marseille, McGill University and Oxford University, where he was a Rhodes Scholar. He moved to France in 1982, where he held the position of lecteur d'anglais at the École Normale Supérieure, rue d'Ulm. He co-founded the Théâtre de l'Autre Rive in Paris in 1983, and the Théâtre Des-Hérités in 1992. In 1995, he joined the Centre de Formation Lyrique of the Paris National Opera, in charge of stage work. In 1998, Jocelyn was named artistic and general director of the Atelier du Rhin, Centre Dramatique, in Colmar, France.

Sara Angel in Maclean's Magazine called Jocelyn "one of this country's most brilliant creative forces - and one of its most controversial."
