= Isabella Esler =

American actress and singer

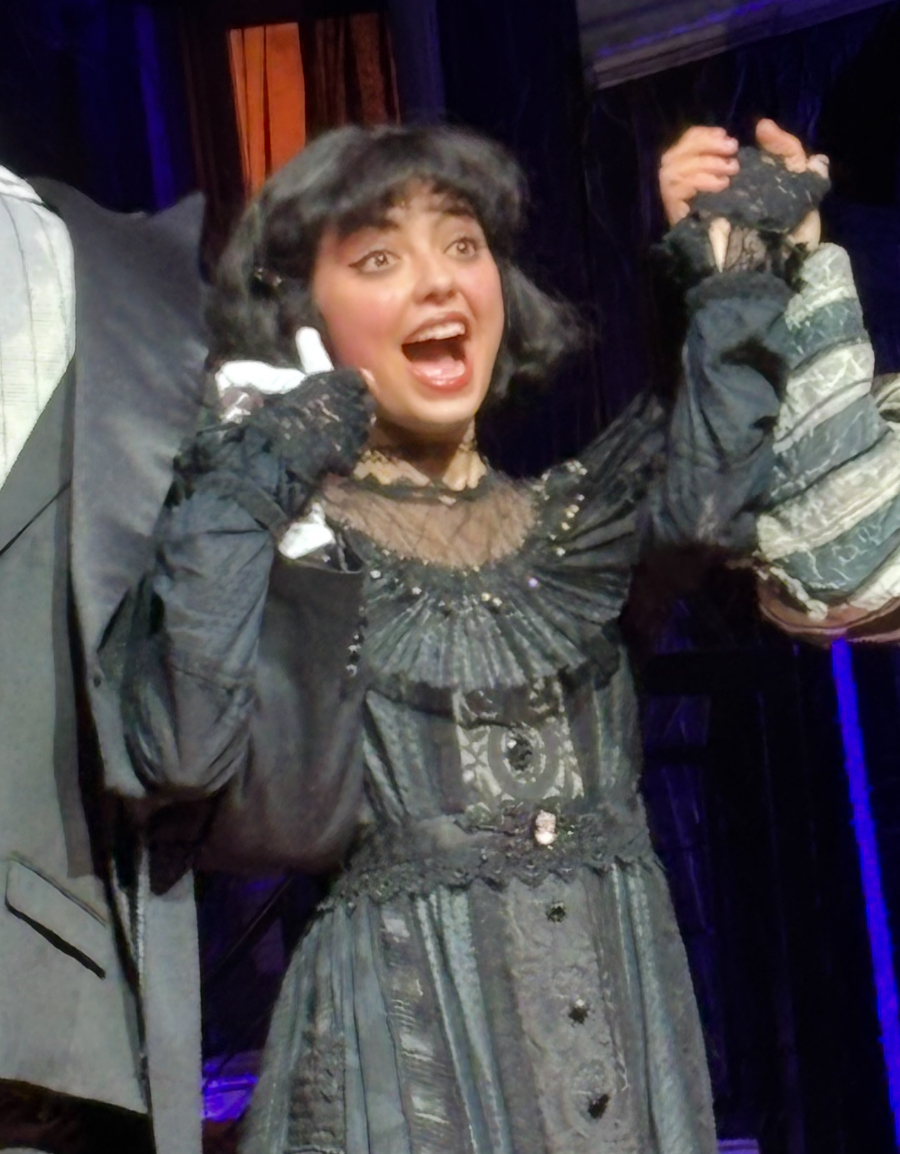
- Esler performing in the Palace Theatre in 2025
- Born: February 20, 2004 (age 22); Roseburg, Oregon
- Occupations: Actress, singer
- Years active: 2022–present
- Website: www.isabellaesler.com

Isabella Esler (born February 20, 2004) is an American actress and singer of Colombian descent. She starred as Lydia Deetz in the first national tour of Beetlejuice.

== Early life and education ==
Esler was born in Roseburg, Oregon and grew up in San Jose, California. She attended Archbishop Mitty High School, graduating in 2022. She had planned to attend Pace University but withdrew after being cast in the national tour of Beetlejuice.

At age six, Esler began performing with Children's Musical Theater San Jose, appearing in youth productions of musicals such as Urinetown, Once Upon a Mattress, and American Idiot. In 2022, she played Sandy Cheeks in a production of The SpongeBob Musical with the same company. At her high school, Esler participated in numerous theatre productions, including a leading role in Mamma Mia!. For her performance, she received the National Youth Theatre Award for Best Lead Performance in a Musical.

== Career ==
Upon graduating high school, Esler was cast in the first national tour of Beetlejuice as Lydia Deetz. The tour began in December 2022, and she remained with the tour until August 2024. Esler's performance received critical acclaim.

Esler next starred as Alice Carter in a Toronto engagement of the musical Life After. The musical opened at the Ed Mirvish Theatre on April 16, 2025 and played until May 10, 2025. In February 2025, a music video of Esler performing "Poetry", a song from the show, was released. For her performance, Esler is nominated for Outstanding Performance by an Individual at the 2025 Dora Awards.

Esler made her off-Broadway debut as Veronica Sawyer in Heathers the Musical, stepping into the role on April 27, 2026.

== Theatre credits ==
Year(s)	Production	Role	Location	Notes	Ref.
2022–2024	Beetlejuice	Lydia Deetz	First National Tour		
2025	Life After	Alice Carter	Ed Mirvish Theatre	Pre-Broadway engagement: Toronto	
2025	Beetlejuice	Lydia Deetz	Palace Theatre	Broadway	
2026	Heathers: The Musical	Veronica Sawyer	New World Stages		
