= Chilina Kennedy =

Canadian actress and singer

- Born: 1978 (age 47–48); Oromocto, New Brunswick
- Education: Sheridan College
- Occupations: Actress, singer
- Years active: 2000–present
- Children: 1
- Website: www.chilinakennedy.com

Chilina Kennedy is a Canadian musical theatre actress, singer, and songwriter. She is best known for having starred as Carole King in Beautiful: The Carole King Musical, having played the role for over 1,200 performances. On Broadway, Kennedy played Mary Magdalene in the 2012 revival of Jesus Christ Superstar and originated the role of Annie Lewis in Paradise Square. Kennedy also starred as Dina in the first North American tour of The Band's Visit.

== Personal life ==
Kennedy was born in Oromocto, New Brunswick, where her father was an officer in the Canadian Forces. When she was growing up, her family moved frequently and lived across Canada, England, and Australia before settling in Kingston, Ontario, during her high school years.

Kennedy attended Kingston Collegiate and Vocational Institute, where she performed in musicals including Anne of Green Gables and Bye Bye Birdie. She later graduated from the musical theatre program at Sheridan College.

In 2003, Kennedy married Fenner Stewart, but they divorced after a decade together. Kennedy was also married to Jacob James, with whom she shares a son, Henry.

== Career ==
=== Musical theatre ===
In 2000, Kennedy had her first professional role when she starred as Anne Shirley in the annual production of Anne of Green Gables at the Charlottetown Festival in Prince Edward Island. She reprised her role in the 2001 production. After this, Kennedy joined the first national tour of Mamma Mia!, initially as a member of the ensemble before later starring as Sophie Sheridan.

In 2005, Kennedy made her Stratford Festival debut when she played Agnes in a production of Gypsy. Also with Stratford Festival, Kennedy starred as Maria in West Side Storyand as Eva Perón in Evita. She also played Philia in A Funny Thing Happened on the Way to the Forum and Lois Lane/Bianca in Kiss Me, Kate with Stratford Festival.

In 2011, Kennedy starred as Mary Magdalene in the Stratford Festival production of Jesus Christ Superstar. The musical then had a pre-Broadway engagement at the La Jolla Playhouse in San Diego. Kennedy made her Broadway debut in 2012 when she reprised her role of Mary Magdalene in the revival of Jesus Christ Superstar, where it played at the Neil Simon Theatre.

Kennedy played Phoebe D'Ysquith in the world premiere production of A Gentleman's Guide to Love and Murder. The musical premiered at Hartford Stage in October 2012, before also playing at the Old Globe Theatre.

In March 2015, Kennedy began starring in Beautiful: The Carole King Musical as Carole King, replacing Jessie Mueller. Kennedy left the Broadway production of Beautiful to reprise her role of Carole King in a limited engagement production of the show which played at the Ed Mirvish Theatre in Toronto between June 27 and September 3, 2017. After that production closed, she then returned to the Broadway production until leaving in 2018. Kennedy then returned to the Broadway production on January 3, 2019. After taking a hiatus to temporarily join the national tour to play Carole King at the Toronto tour stop, she rejoined the Broadway cast before playing her final show on June 9, 2019.

Kennedy starred as Dina in the North American tour of The Band's Visit, opposite Sasson Gabai.

In 2021, Kennedy starred as Annie Lewis in Paradise Square, which had a pre-Broadway engagement at the Nederlander Theatre in Chicago. She reprised her role when the production transferred to Broadway, where it played at the Ethel Barrymore Theatre.

Kennedy starred as Billie Jean King in Love All, a play about the life of King. The play premiered at the La Jolla Playhouse. Kennedy also starred as Cindy in the off-Broadway production of A Sign of the Times.

In 2024, Kennedy played Myrtle Wilson in The Great Gatsby while Sara Chase temporarily left the show on medical leave.

Kennedy played Ms. Hopkins in the pre-Broadway engagement of Life After, which ran at the Ed Mirvish Theatre in Toronto between April 16 and May 10, 2025.

Kennedy is currently starring in Billie Jean at The Chicago Shakespeare Theater. The play, written by Lauren Gunderson and directed by Marc Bruni, is scheduled to run July 18 - August 10, 2025. This is Kennedy's second production playing King, with her also playing the role in the 2024 play by Anna Deavere Smith, as well.

=== Eclipse Theatre Company ===
In 2018, Kennedy founded Eclipse Theatre Company, with the aim of presenting new and re-imagined musicals in Toronto. Some of the company's early productions included Kiss of the Spider Woman and Sunday in the Park with George, to positive reviews.

Kennedy has been writing the music and lyrics for an original musical called Wild About You, which is about a woman who has to put together the pieces of her life as best as she can with her limited memory. A concept album was released in 2023, with songs performed by Katharine McPhee, Alex Newell, Jenn Colella, Lea Salonga, Paul Alexander Nolan, Jessie Mueller, Joaquina Kalukango, and Kennedy. A concert staging was performed at Theatre Royal Drury Lane in England, with a cast that included Rachel Tucker, Eric McCormack, Tori Allen-Martin, and Oliver Tompsett. Subsequently, industry presentations and workshops in October 2024, which included Jessica Vosk in the lead role, were held in New York.

=== Music ===
In 2015, Kennedy released her debut album entitled, What You Find in a Bottle. The album consists of thirteen songs that she wrote over the previous decade.

== Theatre credits ==
Year	Production	Role	Theatre	Category	Ref.
2000	Anne of Green Gables	Anne Shirley	Regional: Charlottetown Festival		
2001	Anne of Green Gables	Anne Shirley	Regional: Charlottetown Festival		
2001-2003	Mamma Mia!	Ensemble	First National Tour		
2003-2004	Mamma Mia!	Sophie Sheridan	First National Tour		
2005	Gypsy	Agnes	Festival Theatre	Stratford Festival	
2005	Major Barbara	Ensemble	Festival Theatre	Stratford Festival	
2006	Lord of the Rings	Ensemble	Princess of Wales Theatre	World premiere: Toronto	
2007	Mack and Mabel	Ensemble	Festival Theatre	Shaw Festival	
2007	Summer and Smoke	Nellie Ewell	Festival Theatre	Shaw Festival	
2008	Wonderful Town	Eileen Sherwood	Festival Theatre	Shaw Festival	
2008	The President	Lydia	Royal George Theatre	Shaw Festival	
2009	West Side Story	Maria	Festival Theatre	Stratford Festival	
2009	A Funny Thing Happened on the Way to the Forum	Philia	Avon Theatre	Stratford Festival	
2010	Kiss Me, Kate	Lois Lane / Bianca	Festival Theatre	Stratford Festival	
2010	Evita	Eva Perón	Avon Theatre	Stratford Festival	
2010-2011	A Funny Thing Happened on the Way to the Forum	Philia	Canon Theatre	Mirvish Productions	
2011	Jesus Christ Superstar	Mary Magdalene	Avon Theatre	Stratford Festival	
2011	Jesus Christ Superstar	Mary Magdalene	La Jolla Playhouse	Pre-Broadway engagement	
2012	Jesus Christ Superstar	Mary Magdalene	Neil Simon Theatre	Broadway	
2012	A Gentleman's Guide to Love and Murder	Phoebe D'Ysquith	Hartford Stage	World premiere production	
2012-2013	A Gentleman's Guide to Love and Murder	Phoebe D'Ysquith	Old Globe Theatre	World premiere production	
2013	The Little Mermaid	Angel	Elgin Theatre	Regional: Ross Petty Productions	
2015-2017	Beautiful: The Carole King Musical	Carole King	Stephen Sondheim Theatre	Broadway (replacement)	
2017	Beautiful: The Carole King Musical	Carole King	Ed Mirvish Theatre	Canadian Premiere	
2017-2018	Beautiful: The Carole King Musical	Carole King	Stephen Sondheim Theatre	Broadway (replacement)	
2018	This Ain't No Disco	Binky	Linda Gross Theatre	Off-Broadway	
2019	Beautiful: The Carole King Musical	Carole King	Stephen Sondheim Theatre	Broadway (replacement)	
2019	Beautiful: The Carole King Musical	Carole King	Princess of Wales Theatre	First National Tour (temporary replacement)	
2019	Beautiful: The Carole King Musical	Carole King	Stephen Sondheim Theatre	Broadway (replacement)	
2019	The Band's Visit	Dina	First National Tour		
2021	Paradise Square	Annie Lewis	Nederlander Theatre	Pre-Broadway engagement	
2022	Paradise Square	Annie Lewis	Ethel Barrymore Theatre	Broadway	
2023	Love All	Billie Jean King	La Jolla Playhouse		
2024	A Sign of the Times	Cindy	New World Stages	Off-Broadway	
2024	The Last Timbit	Michelle	Elgin Theatre		
2024; 2026	The Great Gatsby	Myrtle Wilson	Broadway Theatre	Broadway (temporary replacement)	
2025	Life After	Ms. Hopkins	Ed Mirvish Theatre	Pre-Broadway engagement: Toronto	
2025	Billie Jean	Billie Jean King	Regional, Chicago Shakespeare Theatre		
2025	Reunions	Kate and others	New York City Center Stage II		
