= Paul Alexander Nolan =

Canadian actor

- Born: 1978 (age 47–48); Rouleau, Saskatchewan, Canada
- Occupations: Actor, singer
- Years active: 2001–present
- Spouse: Keely Hutton (2014-present)
- Children: 1
- Website: paulalexandernolan.com

Paul Alexander Nolan is a Canadian actor and singer, who has appeared in several musical theatre productions across Canada and the United States.

In Canada, Nolan appeared in 9 Stratford Festival productions, including starring as Jesus in their 2011 production of Jesus Christ Superstar. In 2012, he made his Broadway debut when that same production transferred to Broadway. Since then, he has originated the roles of Jimmy Ray Dobbs in Bright Star, Tully in Escape to Margaritaville, Jim in Slave Play, and August Rackinger / Charlie O'Brien in Water for Elephants. He has also played Billy Flynn in Chicago and Hugh Dorsey in the 2023 Broadway revival of Parade. He most recently appeared on Broadway originating the role of Max in The Lost Boys.

== Early life ==
Nolan was born and raised in Rouleau, Saskatchewan, which is a small farming community. Growing up, he developed an interest in music by listening to folk, opera, show tunes, and classical music. He attended Rouleau School, where he performed in several musicals and received vocal lessons.

He attended the Randolph College for the Performing Arts. Following college, he worked with Disney Cruise Line as a performer.

== Career ==
In 2001, Nolan made his professional stage debut when he appeared in the ensemble for the Canadian production of Mamma Mia!, which played at the Royal Alexandra Theatre in Toronto.

Nolan made his debut with the Stratford Festival during its 2007 season, where he appeared as Slim in a production of Oklahoma!. Following this, he starred as Tony in Stratford's 2009 production of West Side Story. He also played Orlando in their 2010 production of As You Like It.

In 2011, Nolan starred as Jesus in the Stratford Festival's production of Jesus Christ Superstar. The musical then had a pre-Broadway engagement at the La Jolla Playhouse in San Diego. Nolan then made his Broadway debut in 2012 when he reprised his role of Jesus in the revival of Jesus Christ Superstar, where it played at the Neil Simon Theatre.

During the 2013 Stratford Festival season, Nolan appeared in two productions. He played Fyedka in a production of Fiddler on the Roof, and then played Cousin Kevin in a production of The Who's Tommy.

In December 2013, Nolan joined the cast of Once, playing Guy. He continued with the show until it closed in January 2015. He also played Pasha Antipov in the original Broadway production of Doctor Zhivago, which only played at the Broadway Theatre for just over a month of performances.

He also originated the role of Jimmy Ray Dobbs in the musical Bright Star, which had a pre-Broadway engagement at the Kennedy Center. The musical transferred to Broadway, where it played at the Cort Theatre for four months, closing on June 26, 2016. After this closed, he played Billy Flynn in Chicago for several weeks.

Nolan starred as Tully in the world premiere production of Escape to Margaritaville, a jukebox musical based on the songs of Jimmy Buffett, which played at the La Jolla Playhouse in 2017. He then reprised his role at subsequent pre-Broadway engagements of the musical in New Orleans, Houston, and Chicago. Nolan also reprised his role when the musical transferred to Broadway, where it opened at the Marquis Theatre.

Later in 2018, Nolan starred as Jim in the world premiere of Slave Play, a three-act play by Jeremy O. Harris. It premiered off-Broadway at the New York Theatre Workshop. He reprised the role of Jim when the play premiered on Broadway at the John Golden Theatre for a limited engagement between October 6, 2019, and January 19, 2020. Nolan again reprised his role when the play was later remounted on Broadway at the August Wilson Theatre in 2021, as well as in Los Angeles at the Mark Taper Forum in 2022.

In 2022, he starred in the world premiere of the musical Knoxville. Later in 2022, Nolan starred as Frank Carter in the musical Life After, which played at the Goodman Theatre between June 11 and July 17, 2022.

Nolan played Hugh Dorsey in the New York City Center's production of Parade. He then reprised his role when the production transferred to Broadway, where it played at the Bernard B. Jacobs Theatre for a limited engagement run between February 22, 2023, and August 6, 2023.

He also participated in a staged industry reading of Midnight in the Garden of Good and Evil, based on the novel of the same name.

In 2024, Nolan originated the role of August Rackinger / Charlie O'Brien in the musical adaptation of Water for Elephants. The musical opened on Broadway at the Imperial Theatre in previews on February 24, 2024, ahead of an official opening on March 21, 2024.

== Personal life ==
In 2014, Nolan married Canadian actress Keely Hutton, who he met while performing at the Stratford Festival.

He is a fan of the Toronto Maple Leafs.

== Stage credits ==
Year	Title	Role	Location	Notes	Ref.
2001-2002	Mamma Mia	Ensemble	Royal Alexandra Theatre	Mirvish Productions	
2002	Robin Hood: The Merry Family Musical	Will Scarlet	Elgin Theatre	Regional: Ross Petty Productions	
2003	Cinderella: The Sparkling Family Musical	Ensemble	Elgin Theatre	Regional: Ross Petty Productions	
2006	Jesus Christ Superstar	Jesus	Regional: Stage West Calgary		
2007	King Lear	Ensemble	Festival Theatre	Stratford Festival	
2007	Oklahoma!	Slim	Festival Theatre	Stratford Festival	
2007	Beauty and the Beast	The Beast	Regional: Persephone Theatre		
2008	Cabaret	Bobby	Avon Theatre	Stratford Festival	
2009	West Side Story	Tony	Festival Theatre	Stratford Festival	
2009	Cyrano de Bergerac	Vicomte de Valvert	Festival Theatre	Stratford Festival	
2010	As You Like It	Orlando	Festival Theatre	Stratford Festival	
2010	The Winter's Tale	Ensemble	Tom Patterson Theatre	Stratford Festival	
2011	Jesus Christ Superstar	Jesus	Avon Theatre	Stratford Festival	
2011	Jesus Christ Superstar	Jesus	La Jolla Playhouse	Pre-Broadway engagement	
2012	Jesus Christ Superstar	Jesus	Neil Simon Theatre	Broadway	
2012	Yoshimi Battles the Pink Robots	Ben	La Jolla Playhouse	World premiere	
2013	Fiddler on the Roof	Fyedka	Festival Theatre	Stratford Festival	
2013	The Who's Tommy	Cousin Kevin	Avon Theatre	Stratford Festival	
2013-2015	Once	Guy	Bernard B. Jacobs Theatre	Broadway (Replacement)	
2015	Doctor Zhivago	Pasha Antipov	Broadway Theatre	Broadway	
2015	Daddy Long Legs	Jervis Pendleton	Davenport Theatre	Off-Broadway, Original	
2016	Bright Star	Jimmy Ray Dobbs	Kennedy Center	Pre-Broadway engagement	
2016	Bright Star	Jimmy Ray Dobbs	Cort Theatre	Broadway (Original)	
2016	My Fair Lady	Professor Henry Higgins	Bay Street Theatre	Regional	
2016	Chicago	Billy Flynn	Ambassador Theatre	Broadway (Replacement)	
2017	Escape to Margaritaville	Tully	La Jolla Playhouse	Pre-Broadway engagement: World premiere	
2017	Escape to Margaritaville	Tully	Saenger Theatre	Pre-Broadway engagement	
2017	Escape to Margaritaville	Tully	Hobby Center	Pre-Broadway engagement	
2017	Escape to Margaritaville	Tully	Ford Center	Pre-Broadway engagement	
2018	Escape to Margaritaville	Tully	Marquis Theatre	Broadway (Original)	
2018-2019	Slave Play	Jim	New York Theatre Workshop	Off-Broadway: World premiere	
2019	Slave Play	Jim	John Golden Theatre	Broadway (Original)	
2019	The Who's Tommy	Cousin Kevin	La Jolla Playhouse	Concert staging	
2021-2022	Slave Play	Jim	August Wilson Theatre	Broadway	
2022	Slave Play	Jim	Mark Taper Forum	Center Theatre Group	
2022	Knoxville	Jay Follett	Asolo Repertory Theatre	World premiere	
2022	Life After	Frank Carter	Goodman Theatre	Regional	
2022	Parade	Hugh Dorsey	New York City Center	Off-Broadway	
2023	Parade	Hugh Dorsey	Bernard B. Jacobs Theatre	Broadway	
2023	Midnight in the Garden of Good and Evil	Joe Odom	Staged industry reading		
2024	Water for Elephants	August Rackinger / Charlie O'Brien	Imperial Theatre	Broadway (Original)	
2025	The Bridges of Madison County	Bud	Carnegie Hall	Concert staging	
2025	The Heart	Dr. Breva and others	La Jolla Playhouse	World Premiere	
2026	The Lost Boys	Max	Palace Theater	Broadway (Original)	

== Filmography ==
=== Television ===
Year	Title	Role	Notes
1997	Uncle		Short film
1998	Strike!	Charles Schumacher	Film
1999	Shapeshifter	Alex	Film
2003	The Visual Bible: The Gospel of John	Bridegrom	Film
2003	The Root	Donovan Kinder	Short film
2018	Madam Secretary	Captain David Paley	S5.E4: "Requiem"
2019	Instinct	Jonathan James	S2.E1: "Stay Gold"
2019	The Code	Major Daniel Arcineaux	S1.E12: "Legit Bad Day"
2020	The Scottish Play	Lucas	Film
2021	Hudson & Rex	Ron Craw	S3.E8: "Sleeping Beauty"
2024	The Broadway Show with Tamsen Fadal	Himself	S3.E26
2025	The Gilded Age	Alfred Merrick	Season 3

== Awards and nominations ==
Year	Award	Category	Nominated work	Result	Ref.
2015	Outer Critics Circle Awards	Outstanding Featured Actor in a Musical	Doctor Zhivago	Nominated	
2016	Drama Desk Award	Outstanding Featured Actor in a Musical	Bright Star	Nominated	
