= Britta Johnson =

Canadian-American composer, lyricist and playwright

- Born: May 7, 1991 (age 33); Stratford, Ontario
- Education: University of Toronto (BA)
- Occupation(s): Composer, lyricist, playwright
- Years active: 2009–present

Britta Johnson (born 7 May 1991) is a Canadian-American composer, lyricist, and playwright. She is best known for her musical, Life After.

== Early life and education ==
Johnson was born and raised in Stratford, Ontario. Both of her parents were musicians in the pit orchestra for the Stratford Festival. She has two older sisters, Anika, whom she frequently writes musicals with, and Eliza, who is an opera singer. She first started learning to play the piano when she was three years old, and often spent evenings backstage at Stratford musicals with her parents. Growing up, Johnson was inspired to get involved in music and comedy after her father showed her videos of Victor Borge.

She attended Stratford Central Secondary School, and received her Bachelor's degree in music composition from the University of Toronto. Johnson was also the inaugural artist of The Musical Stage Company's Crescendo Series, which is a multi-year residency where the company produces multiple original musicals by the artist. Johnson's residency produced three original musicals: Life After, Dr. Silver: A Celebration of Life, and Kelly v. Kelly.

== Career ==
Johnson wrote her first full-length musical when she was 18 years old. The musical, Big Box Story, was a comedy loosely inspired by Stratford's youth opposing corporate big-box stores taking over the small town. Johnson wrote the book, music, and lyrics for the musical as part of her high school co-op. The musical was presented and performed at her high school for five days. The run was sold-out, and an additional performance was added which was also attended by local politicians. It caught the attention of Stratford Festival, where it was presented as a gala presentation on August 31, 2009.

The Art Gallery of Ontario partnered with The Musical Stage Company and Acting Up Stage Company to present three short musicals based on art exhibits on display at the museum. Johnson and Sara Farb chose He Is Coming by Otto Willem Albertus Roelofs, which was performed in April 2016.

In 2016, Johnson first presented Life After at the Toronto Fringe Festival, where it won the Paul O’Sullivan Prize for best musical theatre script, as well as the Patron's Pick for musical theatre. The musical was further developed and expanded with the Musical Stage Company and Canadian Stage Company, who presented the full-length musical in 2017. This production won 6 Dora Awards, including Best Musical. In March 2019, it then made its American premiere at The Old Globe Theatre in San Diego. The musical was further developed with an expanded set and direction by Annie Tippe, when it was performed at the Goodman Theatre in Chicago between June and July 2022. The musical will return to Toronto, where it will play a limited engagement at the Ed Mirvish Theatre in April and May 2025.

Johnson also co-wrote and Stupidhead! with Katherine Cullen, who has dyscalculia. The musical, performed by Cullen and Johnson, is a comedy that focuses on the challenges and frustrations of growing up with dyslexia. It premiered at Theatre Passe Muraille in March 2017. At the 2017 Dora Awards, it was nominated for Outstanding New Play.

In 2018, Johnson and her sister, Anika, co-created the immersive musical, Dr. Silver: A Celebration of Life. The musical revolves around a funeral for Dr. Silver, who is a fictional cult leader. The musical, which was produced by The Musical Stage Company, was performed at the Heliconian Club in Toronto between September 13 and October 21, 2018. At the 2019 Dora Awards, the musical was nominated for Outstanding New Musical.

Johnson co-created the musical Kelly v. Kelly with Sara Farb. The musical had its world premiere at the Berkeley Street Theatre in Toronto, where it played between May 26 and June 18, 2023. This production was nominated for six Dora Awards in 2024, including Outstanding New Musical and Outstanding Musical Theatre Production.

In 2024, Johnson and her sister wrote the music and lyrics for The Last Timbit. The musical, in celebration of Tim Hortons' 60th anniversary, was inspired by a 2010 snowstorm that forced people to shelter at a local Tim Hortons. The musical was performed at the Elgin Theatre between June 26 and 30, 2024.

== Works ==
Year	Title	Music	Lyrics	Book	Notes	Ref.
2009	Big Box Story	Britta Johnson			Written for high school credit	
2016	Reframed: He Is Coming	Britta Johnson		Sara Farb		
2016	Life After	Britta Johnson				
2017	Stupidhead!	Britta Johnson	Britta Johnson & Katherine Cullen		Also performer	
2018	Dr. Silver: A Celebration of Life	Britta Johnson & Anika Johnson				
2023	Kelly v. Kelly	Britta Johnson		Sara Farb		
2024	The Last Timbit	Britta Johnson & Anika Johnson		Nick Green		

== Awards and honors ==
Johnson has been nominated for 6 Dora Awards, winning twice.

In 2020, the Broadway Women's Fund of America included Johnson in their inaugural list of "Women to Watch on Broadway". In 2023, the Playwrights Guild of Canada awarded Johnson and Sara Farb the Playwrights Guild Musical Award for creating Kelly v. Kelly. The Toronto Star has also referred to Johnson as "Canada's next great musical theatre hope".

Year	Award	Category	Work	Result	Ref.
2017	Dora Awards	Outstanding New Play	Stupidhead!	Nominated	
2018	Dora Awards	Outstanding Musical Theatre Production	Life After	Won	
2018	Dora Awards	Outstanding New Musical	Life After	Won	
2019	Dora Awards	Outstanding New Musical	Dr. Silver: A Celebration of Life	Nominated	
2019	San Diego Theatre Critics Circle Awards	Outstanding Musical	Life After	Nominated	
2024	Dora Awards	Outstanding Musical Theatre Production	Kelly v. Kelly	Nominated	
2024	Dora Awards	Outstanding New Musical	Kelly v. Kelly	Nominated	
