= Terminus (play) =

- NHB Modern Plays
- Original language: English
- Written by: Mark O'Rowe
- Characters: A (female); B (female); C (male)
- Setting: Dublin

Premiere
- Date: 9 June 2007
- Place: Abbey Theatre; Dublin, Ireland

Terminus is a monologue play by Mark O'Rowe. Written entirely in rhyme, the play follows three characters over the course of a single night in Dublin: a former schoolteacher (A), her lonely, estranged daughter (B), and a serial killer who has sold his soul to the Devil (C).

Terminus premiered at the Abbey Theatre in Dublin on 9 June 2007, before transferring to the Traverse Theatre as part of the Edinburgh Fringe Festival where it won a Fringe First Award in 2008. It was revived by the Abbey in 2009 and again in 2011 with an international tour.

== Original cast ==
- Andrea Irvine as A
- Eileen Walsh as B
- Aidan Kelly as C

== 2011 revival cast ==
- Olwen Fouéré as A
- Catherine Walker as B
- Declan Conlon as C
