= Andrew Penner (musician) =

- Born: Leamington, Ontario, Canada
- Origin: Toronto, Ontario, Canada
- Genres: Folk, Rock and Roll, Soul, Alternative
- Occupations: Instrumentalist, Composer, Sound designer, Producer, Music Director, Sound Mixer, Sound Engineer, Actor
- Website: andrewpenner.ca

Andrew Penner is a Canadian multi-instrumentalist, performer, composer, actor, sound designer, and producer currently residing in Toronto, Ontario. He performs as a solo artist and is the founder of folk rock and roll band Sunparlour Players. Penner is also an actor and has appeared in Soulpepper Theatre’s Spoon River and As You Like It, "Ghost Quartet" and "Natasha, Pierre And The Great Comet Of 1812" (Crows Theatre). He has composed music for Soulpepper Theatre’s Blood Wedding, Fool For Love Stratford Festival’s Grapes of Wrath as well as films Eadweard (film) and Small Town Murder Songs, FX show "Lost Girl" and many others.

== Early life ==
Penner grew up in a Mennonite family on a farm in southern Ontario.

== Career ==
In 2005 Penner formed the band, Sunparlour Players, and in 2007 released their debut album, "Hymns For The Happy". In 2009 they released, Wave North. On the band's 2011 album, Us Little Devils, Penner played eleven instruments. He wrote many songs for the group. In 2014 Sunparlour Players released "The Living Proof" and toured heavily in North America and Europe.

Penner and his wife Erin Brandenburg are the founders of Kitchenband, an arts collective. The collective has many original works including Reesor, Pelee, Petrichor, Detroit Time Machine, The Wreck Of Harold Murphy and BOBLO, the latter of which earned Penner a Dora Mavor Moore Award in 2013 for outstanding sound design/composition.

In 2016 Penner formed a duo, Harrow Fair, with violinist Miranda Mulholland. The pair released an album, Call to Arms. In 2020 Harrow Fair released their sophomore album "Sins We Made".

Penner has created and performed for theatre at The Stratford Festival, Soulpepper, Crows Theatre, CanStage, Native Earth, Obsidian and many others.

Penner has had success in composer Dave Malloy's musicals, performing in the Canadian premieres of both Ghost Quartet (as the Astronomer) and Natasha, Pierre & The Great Comet of 1812 (as Balaga).

He has either won or been nominated for several awards for this work in theatre and film including the Dora Awards, Toronto Theatre Critics Award, Summerworks Jury Award, Leo Awards ("Eadweard")
