= J. Kelly Nestruck =

Canadian journalist and arts critic

- Born: Winnipeg, Manitoba, Canada
- Occupations: Journalist, arts critic

J. Kelly Nestruck (/ˈnɛsˌtrʌk/ NESS-truk) is a Canadian journalist and arts critic. After a longtime stint as the chief theatre critic for The Globe and Mail, he shifted in October 2024 to become a television critic for the paper following the retirement of John Doyle.

== Life and career ==
Nestruck was born in Winnipeg, Manitoba. He grew up between Winnipeg and Montreal. He is bilingual.

Nestruck began writing for The McGill Daily, one of the student-run newspapers at McGill University, while studying history, English, and drama at the school. He began an internship at the National Post as a reporter in 2003. He moved to feature writing shortly after.

In 2006, Nestruck became a subeditor and writer for The Guardian in London, England.

He returned to Canada in 2008 to take the role of theatre critic for The Globe and Mail in Toronto. He is a four-time winner of the Nathan Cohen Award for Excellence in Critical Writing, and in 2013, he was a runner-up for a National Newspaper Award in the Arts and Entertainment category.

He completed a master's degree at the Centre for Drama, Theatre & Performance Studies at the University of Toronto in 2013.

In 2016, Nestruck married playwright and screenwriter Charlotte Corbeil-Coleman. He cited the need to be more present at home for their children, thus making it difficult for him to attend evening theatrical shows, as a reason for his shift to television criticism in 2024.
