= Soulpepper =

Canadian theatre company based in Toronto

Soulpepper is a theatre company based in Toronto, Ontario.

== History ==
Soulpepper was founded in 1998 by twelve Toronto artists aiming to produce lesser-known theatrical classics. It often presents Canadian interpretations of works by noted playwrights such as Harold Pinter, Thornton Wilder, Samuel Beckett, Tom Stoppard and Anton Chekhov.

Soulpepper's founding members are Martha Burns, Susan Coyne, Ted Dykstra, Michael Hanrahan, Stuart Hughes, Diana Leblanc, Diego Matamoros, Nancy Palk, Albert Schultz, Robyn Stevan, William Webster, and Joseph Ziegler.

In 2005, the Soulpepper Theatre Company moved into its permanent building, the Young Centre for the Performing Arts. The joint project with the George Brown College theatre school was designed by local firm KPMB Architects and is located in Toronto's historic Distillery District.

In January 2018, founding artistic director Albert Schultz was publicly accused of sexual assault by four professional actresses who worked with him at Soulpepper. The women involved are Kristin Booth, Diana Bentley, Hannah Miller and Patricia Fagan. Lawsuits on their behalf were filed against both Schultz and Soulpepper. Schultz resigned his position as artistic director on January 4, 2018. The lawsuits were settled out of court in July 2018.

=== Artistic Directors ===
- Albert Schultz (1998-2018)
- Weyni Mengesha (2018-2025)
- Paolo Santalucia (2025-present)

== The Academy ==
Soulpepper Theatre Company aims to contribute to the growth of upcoming generations of theatre artists via the Soulpepper Academy. The Academy, which began in 2006, is a full-time, paid training program. After a nationwide search, eight artists are selected to participate in a one-year residency. During this time, they refine their abilities under the guidance of esteemed theatre practitioners, advance their careers by engaging in Soulpepper productions, offer instruction in local community classrooms, act as mentors to young individuals, and collaborate on collective creative ventures.

The Soulpepper Academy program is divided into two phases. The first is focused on training and pedagogy, while the second shifts to performance/production with ongoing training. The Academy was on hold and under review in 2018, but has since resumed.

== Awards ==
=== Dora Mavor Moore Awards ===
- Parfumerie: Outstanding Production (2010)
- Parfumerie; Outstanding Direction of a Play/Musical, Morris Panych (2010)
- Parfumerie; Outstanding Original Set Design, Ken MacDonald (2010)
- Who's Afraid of Virginia Woolf?; Outstanding Performance by a Male in a Principal Role, Diego Matamoros (2010)
- A Raisin in the Sun; Outstanding Performance in a Leading Role, Alison Sealy-Smith (2009)
- Top Girls: Outstanding Direction of a Play, Alisa Palmer (2008)
- The Time of Your Life: Outstanding Performance in a Leading Role, Joseph Ziegler (2008)
- The Time of Your Life: Outstanding Performance in a Featured Role, Stuart Hughes (2008)
- Leaving Home: Outstanding Performance in a Featured Role, Jane Spidell (2007)
- Our Town: Outstanding Production of a Play (2006)
- Translations: Outstanding Performance in a Featured Role, Michael Simpson (2005)
- No Man's Land: Outstanding Performance, William Hutt (2003)
- The Bald Soprano/The Lesson: Outstanding Direction of a Play, Jim Warren (2001)
- Platonov: Best Production; Outstanding Performance, Diego Matamoros (2000)
- Platonov: Outstanding Direction of a Play, László Marton (1999)
- Endgame: Best Production; Outstanding Sound Design, Richard Feren (1999)

=== Other awards ===
- 2015 - Premier's Awards for Excellence in the Arts, Arts Organization Award
- 2008 - DareArts Foundation Cultural Award to Albert Schultz, in recognition of his outstanding work in empowering and educating at-risk youth
- 2006 - Toronto Arts Council Foundation William Kilbourn Award to Albert Schultz, for contribution to the cultural life of the city
- 2006 - City of Toronto Barbara Hamilton Memorial Award to Albert Schultz, recognizing excellence and professionalism in the performing arts
- 2005 - City of Toronto Barbara Hamilton Memorial Award to Martha Burns
- 2004 - Leonardo da Vinci Award for creativity & innovation in the arts, to Albert Schultz
- 2003 - Salute to the City Award, for outstanding contribution to the cultural life of Toronto, to Albert Schultz
- 2002 - Queen Elizabeth II Golden Jubilee Medal, for outstanding contributions to the community, to Albert Schultz
- 2002 - Arts and Letters Club Award to Susan Coyne & Albert Schultz, recognizing worthy members of the artistic community
- 2001 - Joan Chalmers National Award for Artistic Direction, to Albert Schultz
- 1999, 2001, 2002, 2003 - Lieutenant Governor's Awards for the Arts, recognizing achievement in fundraising
- 1999 - Mayor Mel and Marilyn's Youth Award, for mentoring emerging artists or youth

== See also ==
- Soulpepper Theatre Company production history
