= Elgin and Winter Garden Theatres =

Theatres in Toronto, Ontario

Coordinates: 43°39′11″N 79°22′45″W

Elgin & Winter Garden
- Theatres
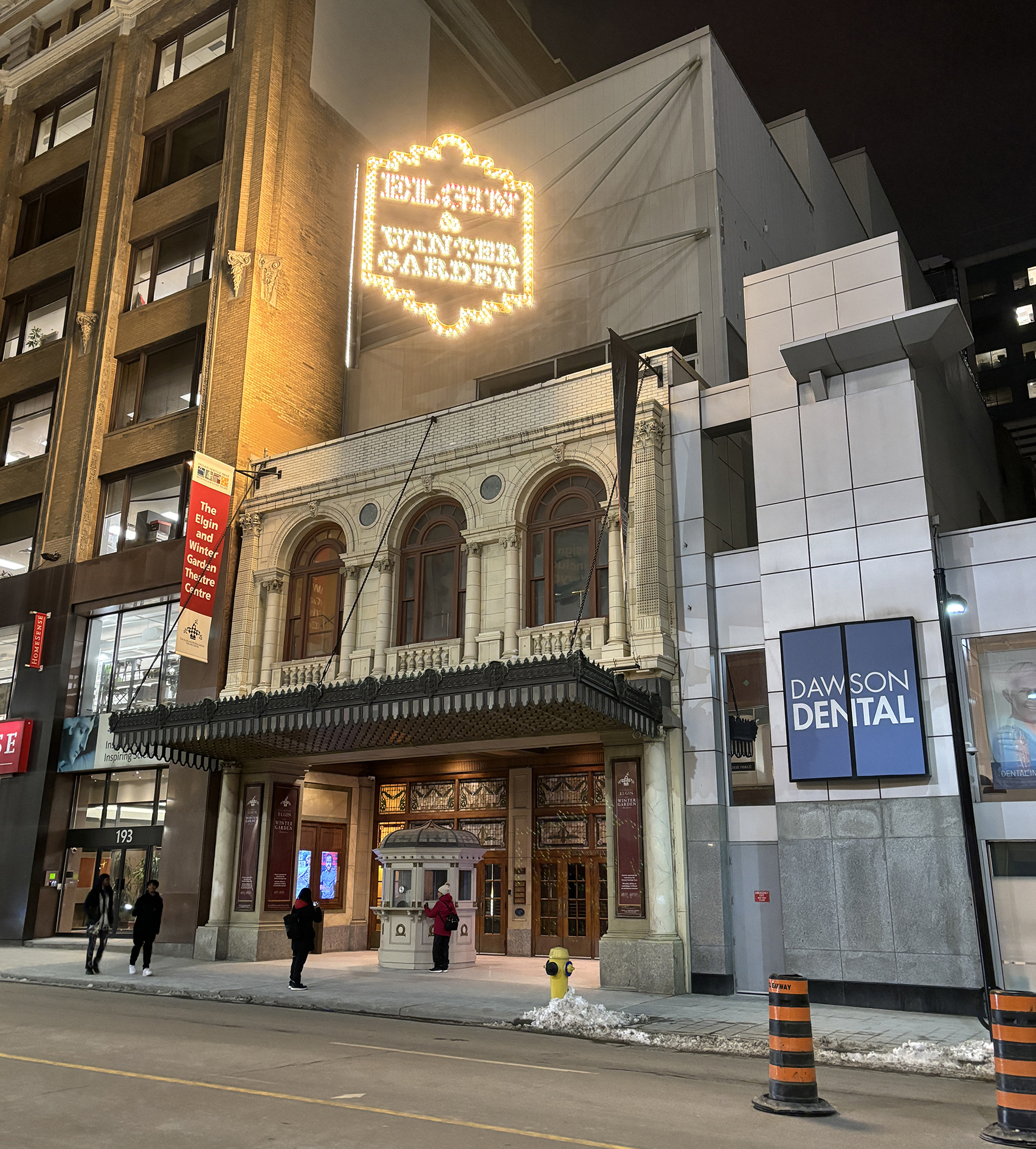
- Interactive map of Elgin & Winter Garden
- Address: 189 Yonge Street; Toronto, Ontario; Canada
- Owner: Ontario Heritage Trust
- Capacity: 1,538 (Elgin Theatre); 982 (Winter Garden Theatre); 2,520 (total)
- Type: Edwardian stacked theatres
- Production: Plays, opera, music, film
- Public transit: Queen station

Construction
- Opened: 1913
- Rebuilt: 1987–1989 (restoration)
- Years active: 1913–present
- Architect: Thomas W. Lamb

Website
- https://www.heritagetrust.on.ca/ewg

National Historic Site of Canada
- Designated: 1982

The Elgin & Winter Garden Theatres are a pair of stacked theatres in Toronto, Ontario, Canada. The Winter Garden Theatre sits above the Elgin, six storeys up from street level. They are the last surviving Edwardian stacked theatres in the world.

== History ==
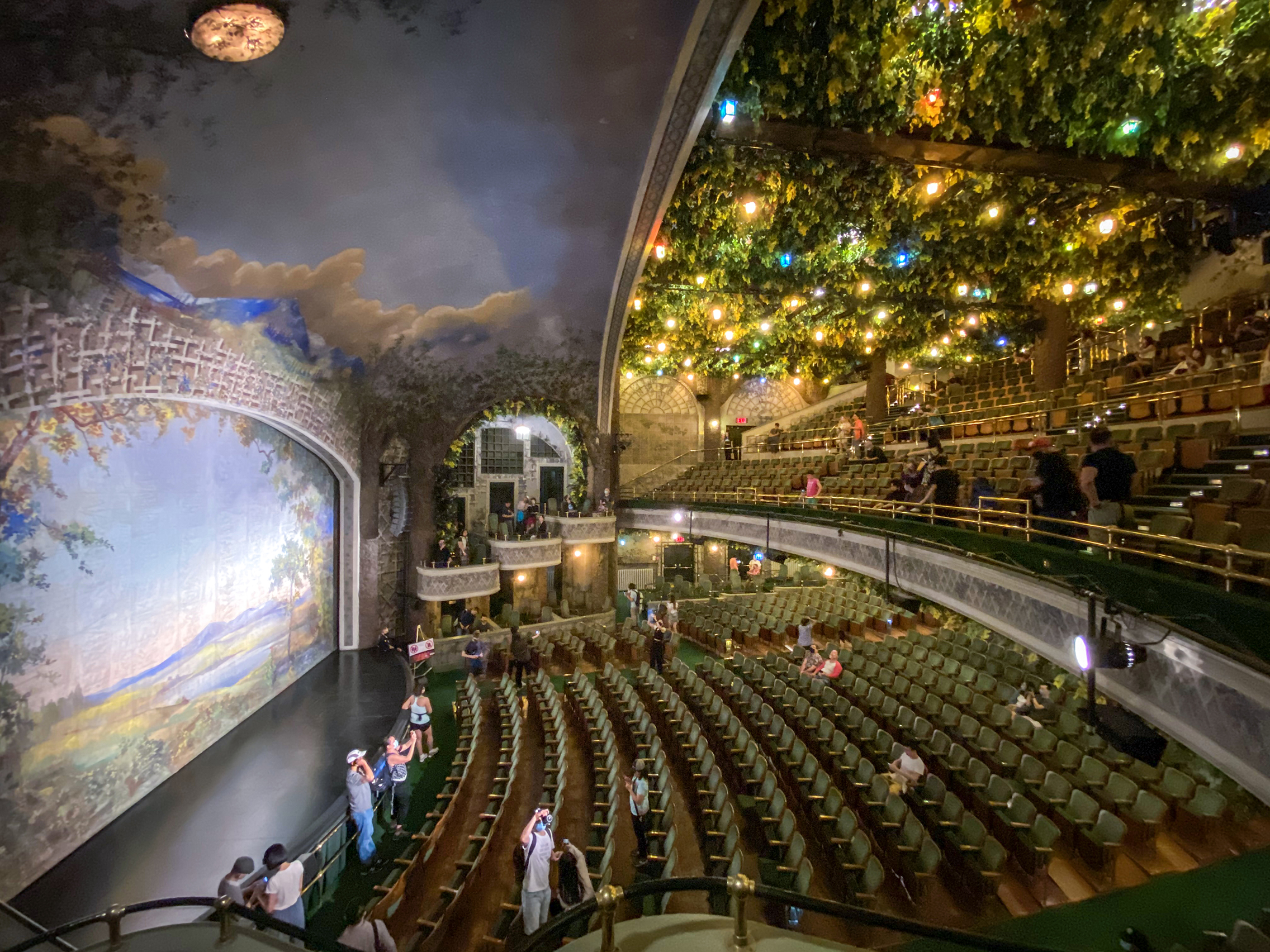
The Winter Garden was designed to be an atmospheric garden, with painted walls in watercolours, and the ceiling is decorated with lanterns and dried beech leaves.

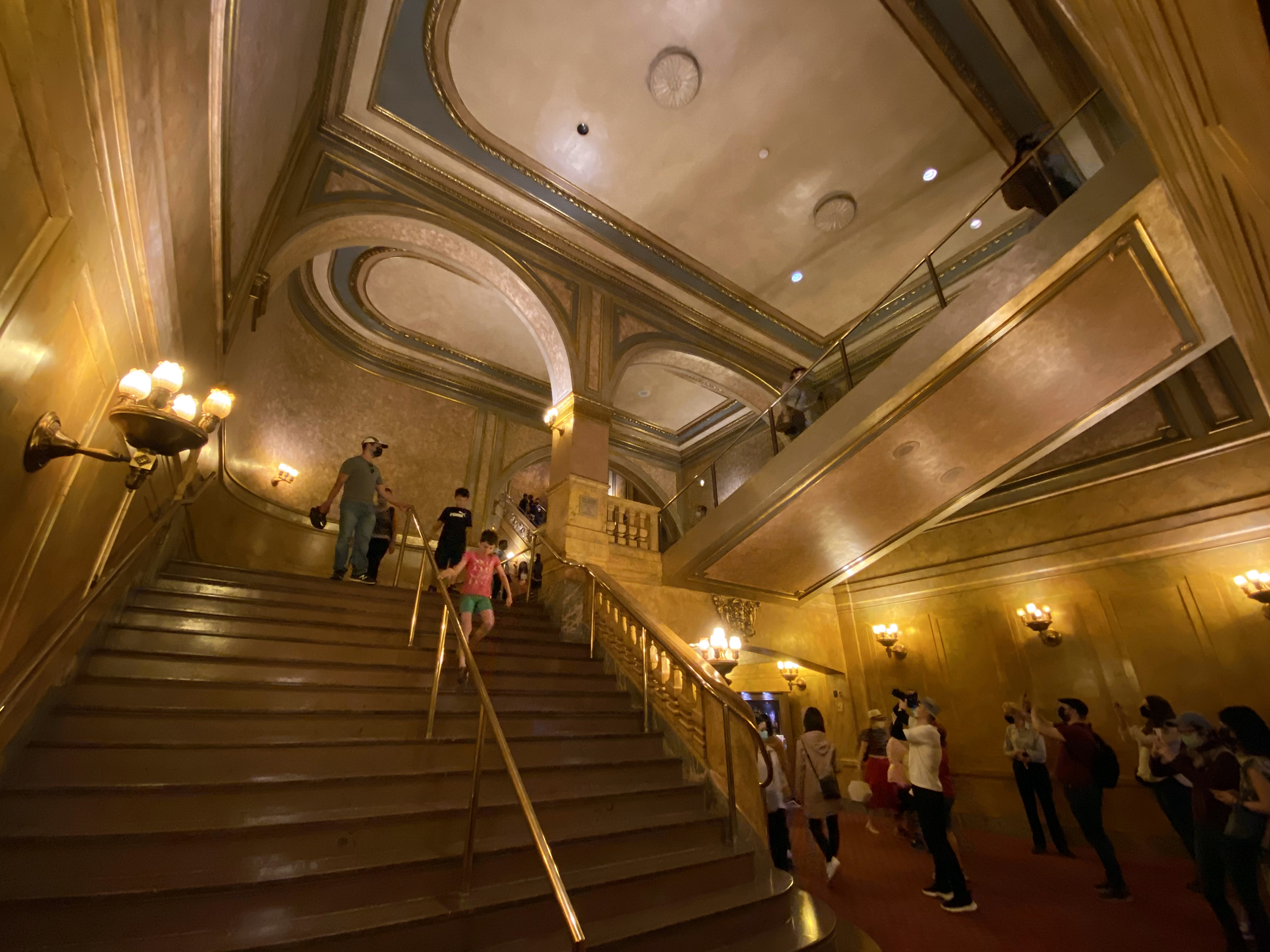
Staircase from main lobby level

The pair of theatres were originally built as the flagship of Marcus Loew's theatre chain in 1913. The building was designed by architect Thomas W. Lamb, who later designed the Ed Mirvish Theatre nearby.

Both theatres were built to show vaudeville acts and the short silent movies of the time. Each theatre was intended for a different class of patron. The gold-and-marble, domed, 'hard-top' lower theatre (originally called Loew's Yonge Street Theatre) was home to continuous vaudeville and movies. The upper-level Winter Garden is an 'atmospheric' country garden under the stars, painted with murals of plants and garden trellises, with tree trunk columns and lantern lights. The upper theatre was built for the 'Big Time' vaudeville market and had reserved seats at premium prices, catering to affluent patrons. As well as competing in a different market, the upper theatre could be used for experimentation with acts, without the risk of closing the lower theatre.

By 1928, feature-length silent films were popular, but sound films were just coming into their own. In 1928, the lower theatre was converted to show sound films and the upper theatre was closed. The Winter Garden remained shuttered for about sixty years. Left inside it was a large collection of vaudeville flats and scenery, now the world's largest surviving collection. In 1969, Loews sold the Elgin to Famous Players. By the 1970s, the Elgin was showing mainly B movies and soft-core pornography.

=== Recent history ===
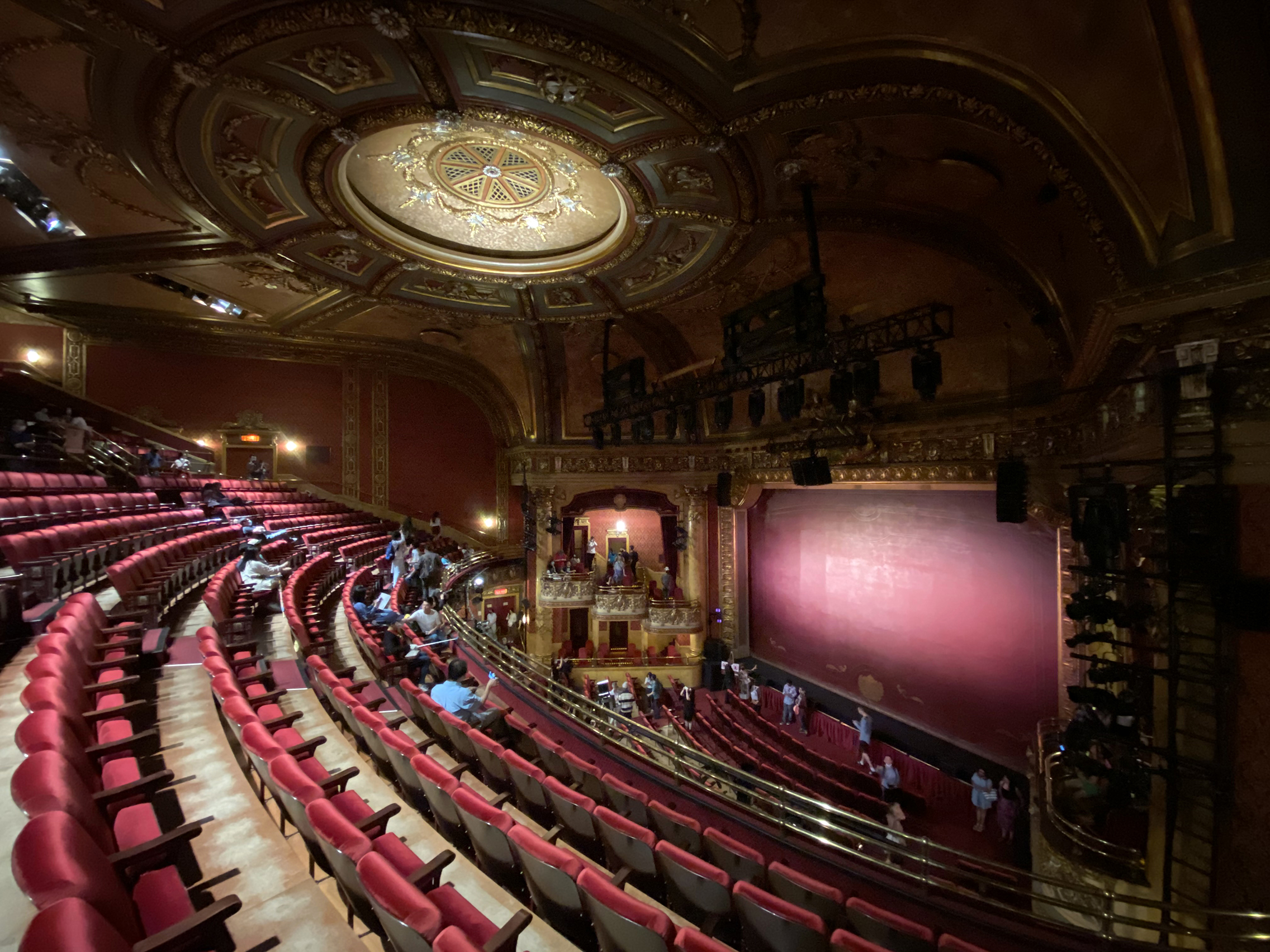
The musical Cats was presented at the Elgin Theatre from 1985 to 1987. The musical was very successful, and demonstrated that the Elgin Theatre was still an economically viable venue.

Since 1979, the Elgin Theatre has served as one of the hosts to the annual Toronto International Film Festival.

In 1981, the Ontario Heritage Foundation bought the structure from Famous Players. The Elgin was closed as a movie theatre on November 15, 1981; the final film presented at the theatre was What the Swedish Butler Saw. From March 1985 through March 1987 the musical Cats was very successfully presented in the essentially unrestored Elgin, showing the viability of the theatre. The building closed in 1987 for a full restoration of the sister theaters and reopened in 1989.

In 1991, Dr. David Griesinger and Steve Barbar of Lexicon, Inc., at the request of acousticians Neil Muncy and Robert Tanner, installed the first production LARES system, an electroacoustic enhancement system that augments architectural acoustics, in the Elgin Theatre. This initial LARES system used two microphones placed at the balcony's front edge to pick up sound from the stage. The microphone signals were digitized and processed in two mainframe computers, and the resulting signals were sent to 56 loudspeakers in the main ceiling and 60 under the balcony, for the purpose of providing additional intelligibility and ambience.

The Elgin Theatre housed the world premiere of the Napoleon musical in 1994, which later transferred to London's West End in 2000. In 1995, it was home to The Who's Tommy musical. From 1996 to 2022, Ross Petty Productions staged pantomimes at the Elgin Theatre each Christmas season.

From February 10 to 14, 2004, Conan O'Brien taped four episodes of NBC's Late Night with Conan O'Brien from the Elgin Theatre. The visit came about via Toronto City Council's CDN$1 million (~US$750,000 at the time) payment to NBC to have the U.S. national television program visit Toronto for a week of shows, part of the overall council-funded PR effort of promoting Toronto as a tourist destination for Americans in the wake of the widely publicized summer 2003 Severe acute respiratory syndrome (SARS) epidemic that adversely impacted the city's tourism industry. Most of the guests on the four shows, including the stand-up comedy performers and musical acts, were Canadians: Mike Myers, Michael J. Fox, Jim Carrey, Eric McCormack, Ron James, Nickelback, Stompin' Tom Connors, and Barenaked Ladies.

The Elgin Theatre played host to the taping of Bryan Adams in Concert for the American broadcast of Great Performances on PBS. The show was filmed in July 2014 and first aired on March 1, 2015.

== In popular culture ==
A pivotal scene in the 1973 made-for-TV film She Cried Murder takes place in the (then shuttered) Winter Garden.

The cover photos for Rush's 1981 live album Exit...Stage Left were shot at the Winter Garden and the Buffalo Memorial Auditorium.

The Winter Garden is seen in the 1994 film Camilla. The location is also featured in the 2017 movie The Shape of Water and receives an acknowledgement in the closing credits. The music video for "Changes" by the Montreal band Stars is also set there.

Emily St. John Mandel's 2014 novel Station Eleven begins on the stage of the Elgin Theatre.

The Winter Garden is credited in Sofia Coppola's film Priscilla.

== Other Thomas Lamb theatres in Canada ==
- Ed Mirvish Theatre, Toronto
- Uptown Theatre, Toronto
- Capitol Cinema, Ottawa
- The Sanderson Centre for the Performing Arts, Brantford

== See also ==
- Opera Atelier
