= Canadian Stage Company =

Canadian non-profit arts organization

Canadian Stage
- Formation: 1988; 38 years ago
- Type: Theatre group
- Location: Toronto, Ontario, Canada
- Coordinates: 43°39′02″N 79°21′50″W
- Artistic director(s): Brendan Healy; Matthew Jocelyn (formerly)
- Website: www.canadianstage.com

Canadian Stage is a Canadian non-profit contemporary theatre company based in Toronto, Ontario, Canada.

== History ==
The company was founded in 1988 with the merger of Centre Stage and Toronto Free Theatre. Centre Stage was a product of a merger of Theatre Toronto and Toronto Arts Productions (the St. Lawrence Centre for the Arts production company) in 1970. Theatre Toronto itself was reconstituted from two defunct theatre companies', the Crest Theatre Foundation and the Canadian Players in 1968.

Canadian Stage has produced more than 300 shows – over half of which have been Canadian plays. Canadian Stage also runs a series of development, education, and outreach programs.

At the end of the 2008–2009 season, Martin Bragg stepped down as artistic producer. At the time of his resignation, Bragg had been with the company for 17 years, and was the company's longest serving artistic director. He cited a desire to pursue other opportunities and spend time with his family as reasons for his departure.

In 1983, the company originated the "Dream in High Park" summer-time open-air series of Shakespeare plays in Toronto's High Park. In 2023, "Dream in High Park" celebrated its 40th anniversary.

In 2010, Canadian Stage partnered with York University's Faculty of Fine Arts to develop an MFA in Theatre – Stage Direction program, which officially launched in 2011. Designed to train directors for large-scale theatrical productions, the program requires students to direct a Canadian Stage production and complete an internship.

== Leadership ==
The Canadian Stage Company is led by an Artistic Director and an Executive Director, as well as a Board of Directors. The current artistic director is Brendan Healy. The current executive director is Monica Esteves, who has been in the role since 2018.

=== History of artistic directors ===
- Bill Glassco (1988–1990)
- Guy Sprung (1990–1992)
- Bob Baker (1992–1998)
- Martin Bragg (1998–2009)
- Matthew Jocelyn (2009–2018)
- Brendan Healy (2018–present)

== Theatres ==
Canadian Stage presents performances at three venues: the 876-seat Bluma Appel Theatre; the Berkeley Street Theatres (244-seat Berkeley Downstairs Theatre and the 167-seat Berkeley Street Upstairs Theatre); and a 1,000-seat outdoor amphitheatre in Toronto's High Park, where Shakespeare is performed each summer.

The company's main stage, The Bluma Appel Theatre, is located in the St. Lawrence Centre for the Arts (a city of Toronto-owned building), at 27 Front Street East. The theatre has been Canadian Stage's home for over 25 years. The St. Lawrence Centre for the Arts was constructed in the late 1960s as part of the city's Centennial Celebrations. Originally named "The Theatre" when it opened in February 1970, it was renovated by the Thom Partnership in 1982.

The Berkeley Street Theatre complex contains two performance spaces, as well as a rehearsal space, props and wardrobe facilities, and the company's administrative offices. The Berkeley site was originally built by the Consumer's Gas Corporation in 1887 as part of a gas pumping station complex. The Berkeley Downstairs Theatre was originally a pump room and served in that capacity until 1955, when Consumer's Gas moved their production out of downtown Toronto. A wrecking firm was hired to demolish the buildings in February 1971, but the complex was renovated instead. The Berkeley Upstairs Theatre was created as part of the general 1976 renovations of the complex. This building is also owned by the City of Toronto.

Situated in the middle of Toronto's High Park, the amphitheatre can seat over 1,000 people. The first production of Shakespeare in High Park was performed in 1983 without a stage. The City of Toronto terraced the hillside of the Amphitheatre to provide seating in 1997. A permanent stage was installed in 2005.

== Awards ==
Canadian Stage is a three-time recipient of the Lieutenant Governor's Award for the Arts, in recognition of building private sector and community support. Canadian Stage has been nominated for 296 Dora Mavor Moore Awards, receiving 62.

== Productions ==
=== 2024–2025 season ===
In March 2024, the 2024–25 season was announced:

- 1939 – by Jani Lauzon and Kaitlyn Riordan
- My Name Is Lucy Barton – written by Elizabeth Strout, adapted by Rona Munro
- Playing Shylock – by Mark Leiren-Young
- The Wizard of Oz: A Holiday Musical Panto for All – by Matt Murray
- Who's Afraid of Virginia Woolf? – by Edward Albee
- Winter Solstice – written by Roland Schimmelpfennig, translated by David Tushingham
- Fat Ham – by James Ijames
- Mahabharata: Karma (Part 1) and Dharma (Part 2) – by Ravi Jain and Miriam Fernandes
