= Make Me a Song (musical) =

- The Music of William Finn
- Logo for the off-Broadway production
- Music: William Finn
- Lyrics: William Finn
- Book: Concept by Rob Ruggiero
- Basis: Music of William Finn
- Productions: 2006 Hartford, Connecticut; 2007 Off-Broadway; 2008 London

Make Me a Song is a musical revue, with lyrics and music by William Finn, which was conceived by Rob Ruggiero in 2006.

The revue includes songs from Finn's musicals In Trousers, Falsettos, A New Brain, Elegies: A Song Cycle and Romance in Hard Times, songs written for The Royal Family of Broadway and Songs of Innocence and Experience, musicals that were never professionally produced, and other unpublished songs, notably the title song. There is no dialogue or plot connecting the songs.

== Productions ==
Make Me a Song premiered in April 2006 as a regional production at Hartford's TheaterWorks, where Rob Ruggiero, who conceived of and directed the show, served as associate artistic director. The cast featured four singers: Sandy Binion, Joe Cassidy, Adam Heller and Sally Wilfert, as well as an on-stage singing pianist, John DiPinto.

A transfer to the off-Broadway Zipper Theater was announced for April that year, but was cancelled because of scheduling issues. Instead, the off-Broadway production premiered on November 12, 2007, at New World Stages; the show was cut down to 90 minutes and played without an intermission. Binion, Heller and Wilfert reprised their roles in the updated production, joined by D. B. Bonds and Darren R. Cohen as the pianist. The off-Broadway run lasted 55 performances before closing on December 30, 2007.

A London production ran from March 6 to April 6, 2008, at the New Players Theatre, directed by Andrew MacBean. The cast included Louise Dearman, Sally Ann Triplett, Frances Ruffelle, Simon Thomas and Ian "H" Watkins.

== Song list ==
- "Make Me a Song" – Adam (written for Mandy Patinkin for a proposed concert of Finn's songs, but never performed)
- "Heart and Music" (from A New Brain) – Company
- "Hitchhiking Across America" – D. B. (written for an unfinished musical)
- "Republicans Part 1" (previously unpublished song written in the 80's or 90's) – Adam
- "Billy's Law of Genetics" (new arrangement of "Gordo's Law of Genetics" from A New Brain) – D. B. & Company
- "Passover" (from Elegies: A Song Cycle) – Sally
- "Only One" (from Elegies) – Sandy
- "Republicans Part 2" – Adam
- "I'd Rather Be Sailing/Set Those Sails" (from A New Brain and In Trousers respectively) – D. B. & Sally
- "Change" (from A New Brain) – Sandy & Company
- "I Have Found" (written for The Royal Family of Broadway) – Sally
- "Republicans Part 3" – Adam
- "You're Even Better Than You Think You Are" (written for Songs of Innocence and Experience) – Company
- "Falsettos Suite: Four Jews in a Room Bitching/A Tight-Knit Family/Love Is Blind/My Father Is a Homo/Trina's Song/March of the Falsettos/The Year of the Child/The Baseball Game/Unlikely Lovers/Falsettoland" (new arrangement of songs from Falsettos) – Company
- "All Fall Down" (from Romance in Hard Times) – Sandy
- "Republicans Part 4" – Adam
- "Stupid Things I Won't Do" (written for The Royal Family of Broadway) – Adam
- "That's Enough for Me" (from Romance in Hard Times) – Sandy
- "I Went Fishing With My Dad" (written while writing Songs of Innocence and Experience) – D.B.
- "When the Earth Stopped Turning" (from Elegies) – Adam
- "Anytime (I Am There)" (from Infinite Joy) – Sally
- "Song of Innocence and Experience" (written for Songs of Innocence and Experience) – Company
- "Finale" – Company

Notes: "Heart and Music" and "Billy's Law of Genetics" were arranged by Jason Robert Brown; "Hitchhiking Across America" was arranged by Vadim Feichtner; "I'd Rather Be Sailing/Set Those Sails" was arranged by Darren Cohen and Carmel Dean; "Change" was arranged by Michael Morris; "You're Even Better Than You Think You Are" and "Falsettos Suite" were arranged by Michael Starobin, Carmel Dean and Michael Morris; and "I Went Fishing With My Dad" and "Song of Innocence and Experience" were arranged by Carmel Dean. All the other songs used the original arrangements.

== Recording ==
An original cast recording of the off-Broadway cast was released on April 29, 2008, by Ghostlight Records. The double disc set includes live recordings of every song in the revue, liner notes written by theatre writer Steven Suskin, and a bonus track of William Finn singing "Mister, Make Me a Song," which was played from a recording to open the show before transitioning into Heller's live rendition.

== Awards and nominations ==
Year	Award	Category	Result
2007-2008	Drama Desk Awards	Outstanding Revue	Nominated
2007-2008	Outer Critics Circle Awards	Outstanding New Off-Broadway Musical	Nominated
