= Songs of Innocence and Experience (song cycle) =

2005 song cycle by William Finn

- Music: William Finn; Deborah Abramson; Will Aronson; Carmel Dean; Vadim Feichtner; Gihieh Lee
- Lyrics: William Finn
- Basis: Inspired by Songs of Innocence and Experience by William Blake and Finn's undergraduate years at Williams College
- Productions: 2005 Williams College premiere; 2009 New York concert; 2012 Lincoln Center American Songbook

Songs of Innocence and Experience is a song cycle with lyrics by William Finn and music by Finn and several of his former students, inspired by William Blake's poetry collection of the same name and by Finn's own undergraduate years at Williams College. Commissioned by the college, it premiered in October 2005 as part of the inaugural season of its '62 Center for Theatre and Dance, and was subsequently presented in New York City in 2009 and 2012.

== Background ==
Finn, a 1974 graduate of Williams College, was commissioned by the college to write a new piece for the opening of its '62 Center for Theatre and Dance, a $50 million performing arts complex that also became the home of the Williamstown Theatre Festival. The resulting piece, Songs of Innocence and Experience, took its title and theme from William Blake's 1789–1794 poetry collection of the same name, recast around Finn's own experience of Williams and, more broadly, the relationships between teachers and students. All 19 songs have lyrics by Finn, who also wrote six of the melodies himself; the remaining music was written by students Finn had taught at NYU's Tisch School of the Arts, including Deborah Abramson, Will Aronson, Carmel Dean, Vadim Feichtner, and Gihieh Lee.

In a personal essay published in the Williams Alumni Review around the time of the premiere, Finn wrote about specific Williams professors who had shaped him, including philosophy, literature, and drama faculty such as Larry Graver, Fred Rudolph, Jack Savacool, Clay Hunt, Peter Grudin, and Don Gifford, several of whom are referenced by name in the finished piece. One song, "Mark Hopkins and the Log," takes its title directly from Rudolph's doctoral dissertation, which Finn singled out in the same essay as a work he admired.

== Premieres and performances ==
=== 2005 Williams College premiere ===
Songs of Innocence and Experience received its premiere on October 7 and 8, 2005, at the '62 Center for Theatre and Dance, as part of the center's inaugural CenterSeries program of artist residencies, which that season also included Philip Glass, Billy Collins, and the Handspring Puppet Company. The performance was directed by Philip Himberg, and the cast included Finn himself alongside fellow Williams alumni Michael Winther and Sebastian Arcelus, as well as Malcolm Gets, Darius de Haas, Lee Zarrett, Megan Lawrence, and Sally Wilfert.

=== 2009 New York concert ===
On January 26, 2009, the piece was presented at Merkin Concert Hall, part of the Kaufman Music Center, in Manhattan, in a benefit concert for Congregation Beit Simchat Torah marking the 14th year of the congregation's concert series. Both Playbill and BroadwayWorld described this performance as the work's New York premiere. It was again directed by Philip Himberg, with musical direction by Vadim Feichtner, and narrated by Finn. Malcolm Gets was originally announced for the cast but withdrew before the performance; the concert as performed featured Sally Wilfert, Ann Harada, Megan Lawrence, Sebastian Arcelus, Kevin Kirkwood Smith, Michael Winther, and Lee Zarrett.

=== 2012 Lincoln Center American Songbook ===
The piece was presented again on January 14, 2012, at the Allen Room (since renamed the Appel Room) at Jazz at Lincoln Center as part of Lincoln Center's American Songbook series. The cast included Sebastian Arcelus, Darius de Haas, Ann Harada, Megan Lawrence, Mary Testa, Sally Wilfert, Michael Winther, and Lee Zarrett, accompanied by a twelve-piece orchestra with orchestrations by Michael Starobin and David Siegel. Deborah Abramson served as musical director and conductor, and Philip Himberg again directed. The program ran approximately 90 minutes without intermission.

==== Musical numbers (2012 performance) ====
All lyrics are by Finn; the composer of each song's music is given in parentheses.

- "My Four Years at Williams College" (Finn)
- "I Love Television" (Abramson)
- "The Girl of His Dreams" (Lee)
- "I Went Fishing with My Dad" (Finn)
- "Little Mikey" (Abramson)
- "Blow Me (Blue Movie, Part One)" (Dean)
- "Song of the Refrigerator" (Aronson)
- "Bob Moss and Playwrights Horizons" (Finn)
- "You're Even Better Than You Think You Are" (Finn)
- "Why Do High School Teachers Make Me Cry" (Dean)
- "I Think You'll Remember My Name" (Feichtner)
- "I'm Not a Pretty Girl in My Country" (Lee)
- "Eight Cigarettes a Day" (Feichtner)
- "Kiss Me (Blue Movie, Part Two)" (Abramson)
- "Mark Hopkins and the Log" (Abramson)
- "Republicans" (Finn)
- "How to Make Delicious Chocolate Pudding" (Abramson)
- "The Essential Me" (Abramson)
- "Song of Innocence and Experience" (Finn)

== Critical reception ==
Reviewing the 2012 performance for The New York Times, Stephen Holden found the evening's songs frequently witty and well-served by their performers, singling out "How to Make Delicious Chocolate Pudding" as a "witty short story" told through song and "Why Do High School Teachers Make Me Cry?" as the program's most touching number. Writing in Cabaret Scenes, Joel Benjamin judged the piece uneven, ranging "from sublime to obscene to unfocused," and felt it did not reach the level of Finn's best-known work; he singled out "I Went Fishing with My Dad," "Song of the Refrigerator," "You're Even Better Than You Think You Are," and "Why Do High School Teachers Make Me Cry?" for praise, while faulting "Republicans" as overly partisan. Both reviewers praised the performing cast and the orchestrations.

== See also ==
- Infinite Joy, a Finn revue whose later installments featured songs from the cycle
- Make Me a Song, a Finn revue that likewise drew on the cycle
