= Christian Borle =

American actor (born 1973)

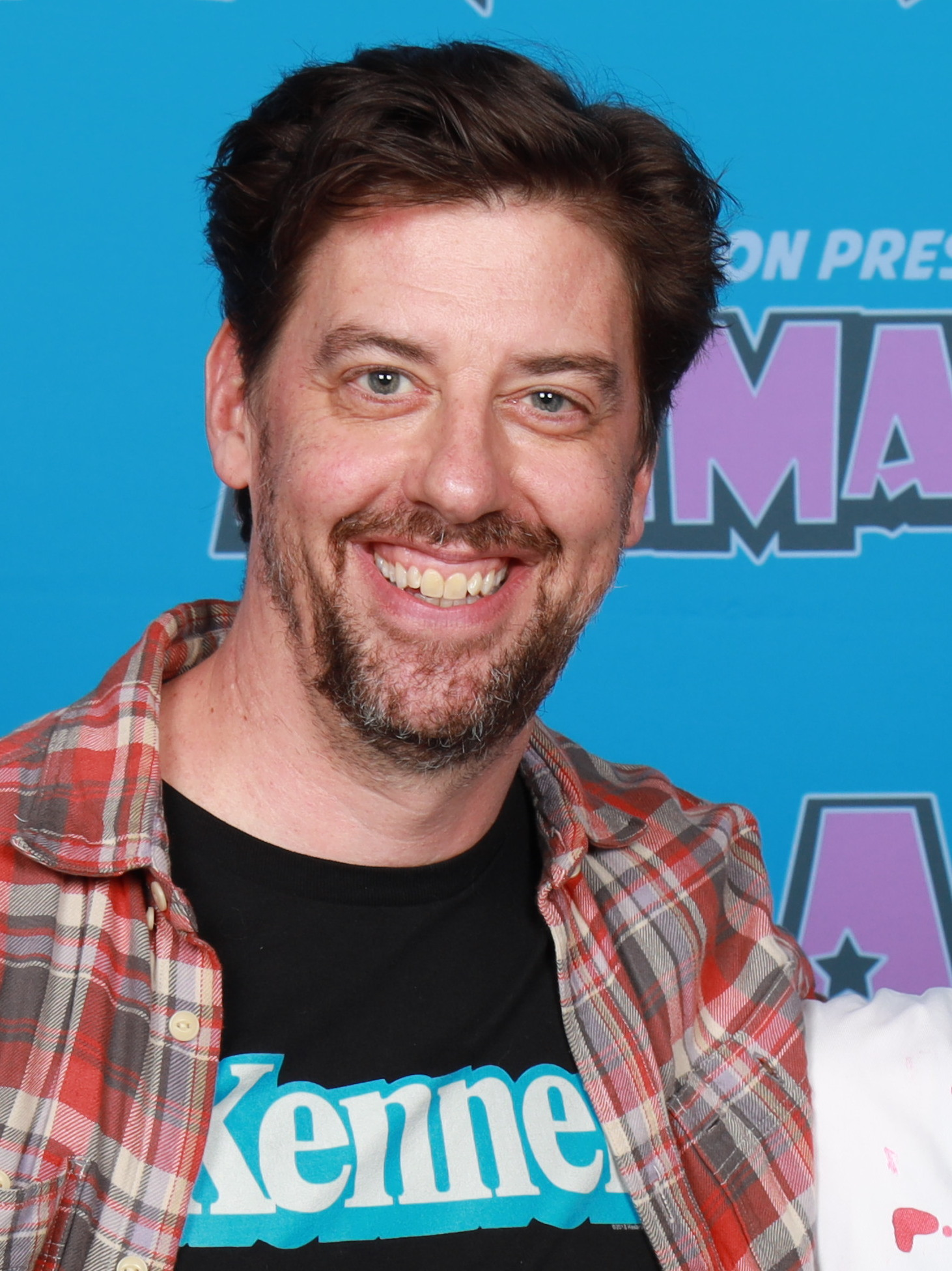
- Borle at Animate! Columbus in 2025
- Born: Christian Dominique Borle; October 1, 1973 (age 53); Pittsburgh, Pennsylvania, United States
- Education: Carnegie Mellon University (BFA)
- Occupations: Actor; singer; dancer
- Years active: 1995-present
- Known for: Falsettos; Something Rotten! Legally Blonde; Smash; Hazbin Hotel; Spamalot
- Spouse(s): Sutton Foster (m. 2006; div. 2009) Skye Mattox (m. 2024)

Christian Dominique Borle (born October 1, 1973) is an American actor and singer. He is a two-time Tony Award winner for his roles as Black Stache in Peter and the Starcatcher and as William Shakespeare in Something Rotten!. Borle also originated the roles of Prince Herbert, et al. in Spamalot, Emmett in Legally Blonde, and Joe in Some Like It Hot on Broadway, earning Tony nominations for the latter two. He starred as Marvin in the 2016 Broadway revival of Falsettos, which also earned him a Tony nomination. His first leading role on Broadway was Jimmy Smith in Thoroughly Modern Millie. He would later also star as Bert in Mary Poppins and Willy Wonka in Charlie and the Chocolate Factory. He also portrayed Orin Scrivello in the Off-Broadway revival of Little Shop of Horrors. Borle starred as Tom Levitt on the NBC musical-drama television series Smash and Vox in the adult animated black comedy musical series Hazbin Hotel.

He has been nominated for five Tony awards and won two, and he also won a Grammy for Best Musical Theater Album for the original cast recording of Some Like It Hot in 2024.

== Early life ==
Christian Dominique Borle was born on October 1, 1973, and raised in Pittsburgh, Pennsylvania, the son of Andre Bernard Borle (1930–2011), a professor of physiology at the University of Pittsburgh. His love for Star Wars and drawing made him dream of becoming a comic book artist when he grew up, but it was only when a friend convinced him to audition for a school play in his second year at Shady Side Academy that he began to develop an interest in acting.

Borle attended the School of Drama at Carnegie Mellon University, graduating in 1995. After he graduated, he moved to New York City and landed his first acting job. He worked as an elf at Macy's Santaland.

== Career ==
=== 1995–2004: Early career, Broadway debut and Thoroughly Modern Millie ===
Soon after moving to New York City, Borle was cast in The Who's Tommy. Returning to the states, he joined the national tour of West Side Story in 1996, as a replacement for the role of Riff. Borle was next cast as Willard Hewitt in the first national tour of Footloose, which opened on December 15, 1998.

After his tenure as Willard, Borle made his Broadway debut in the ensemble of the 2000 revival of Jesus Christ Superstar. He left the production after two months to reprise his role of Willard Hewitt (succeeding Tom Plotkin) in the Broadway production of Footloose in June 2000. Soon after joining the company, the show received its closing notice, and Borle remained with the show for a few weeks through its final performance on July 2, 2000.

He was the dance captain and understudy for several characters for the short-lived 2002 musical Amour.

Borle appeared in a 2003 advertisement for the California-based online auction company eBay. In the 30-second TV spot, Borle plays a store clerk who breaks into song and dance when asked about a product. The song, "That's on eBay", was a parody of the Dean Martin standard "That's Amore". Also in 2003, he replaced Gavin Creel in the role of Jimmy in Thoroughly Modern Millie. He married his co-star, actress Sutton Foster, who had played Millie, in September 2006. Borle and Foster divorced in 2009.

=== 2005–2010: Spamalot, Legally Blonde and Mary Poppins ===
Borle performed in Monty Python's Spamalot, in which he originated a number of roles, including Prince Herbert, the Historian, Not Dead Fred, A French Guard, and Sir Robin's Minstrel. His performance earned him a 2005 Drama Desk Award nomination as Outstanding Featured Actor in a Musical and a Broadway.com Audience Award for Favorite Featured Actor in a Musical. He is known for originating the role of Emmett Forrest in Legally Blonde on Broadway, for which he was nominated for the Tony Award for Best Featured Actor in a Musical. The musical is based on MGM's 2001 film of the same name.

He was featured in the Encores! staged concert version of On the Town as Ozzie in November 2008. He appeared in a workshop production of a new play titled Peter and the Starcatcher in 2009. He played Bert in the Broadway production of Mary Poppins, replacing Adam Fiorentino in the role on October 12, 2009, and then left the cast on July 15, 2010.

In 2010, he played a golf caddy in the film The Bounty Hunter. In Fall 2010/Winter 2011, Borle played the role of Prior Walter in Signature Theatre Company's 20th anniversary production of Tony Kushner's Angels in America.

=== 2011–2014: Smash and Peter and the Starcatcher ===
On February 25, 2011, it was announced that Borle had joined Steven Spielberg's new NBC pilot Smash with Debra Messing, Anjelica Huston, Katharine McPhee, Brian d'Arcy James, and Megan Hilty. The series follows a cross-section of characters who come together to mount a Marilyn Monroe-themed musical (which is called Bombshell) on Broadway. In May 2011, it was reported that NBC had picked up the show as a series for the 2011–2012 season. In March 2012, NBC announced it would renew the series for a second season with 15 episodes. The show was officially cancelled by NBC in May 2013.

Borle was a member of the original cast in the Regional and Off-Broadway productions of Peter and the Starcatcher that ran until April 24, 2011. He reprised the role of "Black Stache" on Broadway in April 2012, where his performance earned him his second Tony Award nomination and first win as Best Featured Actor in a Play. He ended his run in the Broadway production of Peter and the Starcatcher on June 30, 2012, ahead of taping for Smash, which began in August 2012.

Borle played Max Dettweiler in the live television production of The Sound of Music Live!, which aired on NBC on December 5, 2013. He played Mr. Darling and Mr. Smee in the live TV production of Peter Pan Live!, which aired on NBC on December 4, 2014.

=== 2015–2018: Something Rotten!, Falsettos and Charlie and the Chocolate Factory ===
He won the 2015 Tony Award for Best Performance by an Actor in a Featured Role in a Musical for the role of William Shakespeare in Something Rotten!, which opened on Broadway at the St. James Theatre on March 23, 2015, in previews and officially on April 22, 2015. Borle provided the voice of Mr. Bungee on the cast recording of Encores! A New Brain. Dan Fogler, who played the part onstage, was unable to record the album as he was busy filming Fantastic Beasts and Where to Find Them.

Borle played Marvin in the limited Broadway revival of Falsettos, directed by James Lapine, alongside Andrew Rannells and Stephanie J. Block who played Whizzer and Trina, respectively. Borle left the cast of Something Rotten! on July 16, 2016, to prepare for Falsettos, which opened in previews on September 29, 2016, and officially on October 27, 2016. Borle was nominated for a Tony Award for his performance. The show closed on January 8, 2017, after 30 previews and 84 performances.

Borle also made an appearance with his former wife, Sutton Foster, in Gilmore Girls: A Year in the Life. His musical talents were used in Episode 3 for the Star's Hollow musical, which walked through the history of the quirky small town. The two had "found Gilmore Girls together and became fans of the show long before there were talks of a revival. For both actors, being a part of the Stars Hollow world was a special experience because they already loved the show before they became involved with it."

On May 9, 2016, it was announced that Borle would play Willy Wonka in the Broadway production of Roald Dahl's Charlie and the Chocolate Factory at the Lunt-Fontanne Theatre, which opened on March 23, 2017. A cast album was announced March 21, 2017. The show played its final performance on January 14, 2018.

Borle made his directorial debut with Popcorn Falls, which premiered at the Riverbank Theatre in Marine City, Michigan. The show ran from August 18–27, 2017. It was such an unexpected success that the theatre had to add extra performances to keep up with demand.

In March 2018, it was announced that Borle would again reunite with Sutton Foster, this time for two episodes of her TV show Younger as a journalist named Don Ridley. He was also announced as the lead in the Encores! production of Me and My Girl, alongside former Mary Poppins co-star Laura Michelle Kelly.

=== 2019–present: Little Shop of Horrors and Some Like It Hot ===
In July 2019, it was announced that Borle would star as Orin Scrivello in the Off-Broadway revival of Little Shop of Horrors, which began previews at the Westside Theatre on September 17, 2019, with an official opening of October 17. Borle won a Lucille Lortel Award and was nominated for an Outer Critics Circle Award for his performance.

In August 2021, it was announced that Borle would star in the 2022 Encores! season. Borle was cast as the Baker in Into the Woods, running from May 4–15, 2022. This would have been his third show in the 2022 Encores! season. Borle was ultimately replaced by Neil Patrick Harris.

In March 2022, it was announced that Borle was cast in a workshop for the new musical Some Like It Hot, an adaptation of the 1959 film of the same name, as Joe/Josephine. He originated this role on Broadway through the show's end on December 30, 2023, at the Shubert Theatre. He won a Grammy in 2024 for the original cast recording of Some Like It Hot in the Best Musical Theater Album category.

Borle voices Vox, a recurring antagonist in the adult animated dark comedy series Hazbin Hotel. The ongoing series premiered on Amazon Prime Video in 2024.

In the fall of 2024, he starred as Jim Bakker in the Broadway transfer of Tammy Faye. He took over the role from his Falsettos co-star Andrew Rannells who originated the role in London and dropped out of the Broadway production before it opened.

Borle has directed two concerts in the 92nd Street Y's Lyrics and Lyricists series. In 2023, Borle directed Tale as Old as Time: The Songs of Howard Ashman, which starred Heather Ayers, John Cariani, Nadina Hassan, Manu Narayan, and Khadija Sankoh. In 2025, Borle directed The Lovers, The Dreamers, & Me: The Songs of Paul Williams in collaboration with his wife, the dancer and choreographer Skye Mattox, who co-wrote the program with Borle.

== Personal life ==
Borle met actress Sutton Foster in college and they married on September 18, 2006. They divorced in 2009. In 2012, Foster said that she and Borle remain friends and continue to support and appear in each other's work. In 2018, Borle began dating Broadway dancer and choreographer Skye Mattox, granddaughter of the dancer and choreographer Matt Mattox. Borle and Mattox married in 2024.

== Theatre credits ==
Year(s)	Production	Location	Role	Notes
1995	The Who's Tommy	Offenbach, Germany	Pinball Lad 1	Replacement
1996–1997	West Side Story	National Tour	Riff	Replacement
1998–2000	Footloose	National Tour	Willard Hewitt	
2000	Jesus Christ Superstar	Ford Center for the Performing Arts; Broadway	Disciple	Original Broadway Revival Cast
2000	Footloose	Richard Rodgers Theatre; Broadway	Willard Hewitt	Replacement
2001	The Baby and Johnny Project	New York Theatre Workshop; Off-Broadway	Billy Kostecki	
2001	Just So	North Shore Music Theatre; Regional	Kangaroo / Cooking Stove / Bushbuck	
2001	The 3 Musketeers, One Musical For All	American Musical Theatre of San Jose; Regional	Planchet	Original American Cast
2002	Prodigal	York Theatre; Off-Broadway	Kane Flannery / Zach Marshall	Original Cast
2002	Amour	Music Box Theatre; Broadway	Dance Captain, Advocate (Understudy) / Bertrand (Understudy) / Dusoleil (Understudy) / Newsvendor (Understudy) / Painter (Understudy)	Original Broadway Cast
2003	Elegies: A Song Cycle	Mitzi E. Newhouse Theater; Off-Broadway	Original Performer	
2003–2004	Thoroughly Modern Millie	Marquis Theatre; Broadway	Jimmy Smith	Replacement
2004	Snoopy! The Musical	New York City Center; Concert	Snoopy	
2004	Time After Time	New York City Center; Reading	H. G. Wells	
2004–2005	Spamalot	Shubert Theatre; Regional	Historian / Not Dead Fred / French Guard / Minstrel / Prince Herbert	
2005–2006	Spamalot	Shubert Theatre; Broadway	Historian / Not Dead Fred / French Guard / Minstrel / Prince Herbert	Original Broadway Cast
2005	The Flamingo Kid	Workshop	Performer	
2007	Legally Blonde	Golden Gate Theatre; Regional	Emmett Forrest	
2007–2008	Legally Blonde	Palace Theatre; Broadway	Emmett Forrest	Original Broadway Cast
2008	On the Town	Encores! New York City Center	Ozzie	
2009	Peter and the Starcatcher	La Jolla Playhouse; Regional	Black Stache, et al.	
2009–2010	Mary Poppins	New Amsterdam Theatre; Broadway	Bert	Replacement
2010–2011	Angels in America	Signature Theatre Company; Off-Broadway	Prior Walter, et al.	
2011	Peter and the Starcatcher	New York Theatre Workshop; Off-Broadway	Black Stache, et al.	
2012	Peter and the Starcatcher	Brooks Atkinson Theatre; Broadway	Black Stache, et al.	Original Broadway Cast
2014	Sweeney Todd: The Demon Barber of Fleet Street	Lincoln Center	Adolfo Pirelli	
2014	Little Me	New York City Center	Various Characters	
2015–2016	Something Rotten!	St. James Theatre; Broadway	The Bard / William Shakespeare	Original Broadway Cast
2015	A New Brain	Encores! New York City Center	Mr. Bungee	Cast Album Only
2016–2017	Falsettos	Walter Kerr Theatre; Broadway	Marvin	Original Broadway Revival Cast
2017–2018	Charlie and the Chocolate Factory	Lunt-Fontanne Theatre; Broadway	Willy Wonka	Original Broadway Cast
2017	Popcorn Falls	Riverbank Theatre; Regional	Director & Dramaturg	
2018	Me and My Girl	Encores! New York City Center	Bill Snibson	
2019	The Who's Tommy	John F. Kennedy Center for the Performing Arts	Captain Walker	
2019–2022	Little Shop of Horrors	Westside Theatre; Off-Broadway	Orin Scrivello & Others	Original Off-Broadway Revival Cast
2022–2023	Some Like It Hot	Shubert Theatre; Broadway	Joe / Josephine	Original Broadway Cast
2024	Bye Bye Birdie	John F. Kennedy Center for the Performing Arts	Albert Peterson	
2024	Tammy Faye	Palace Theatre; Broadway	Jim Bakker	Original Broadway Cast
2026–2027	Falsettos	Carnegie Hall	Marvin	Reunion concert
2027	Falsettos	London Palladium; West End	Marvin	

== Filmography ==
=== Film ===
Year	Show	Role	Notes
1995	Stonewall	Bar Patron	Uncredited
2001	The Accident	Delivery Guy	Short (unreleased)
2010	The Bounty Hunter	Caddy	
2014	Shutterflies	Lieutenant Burns	Short
2014	Dinner	Father	Short
2015	Blackhat	Jeff Robichaud	

=== Television ===
Year	Show	Role	Notes
1998	Ghost Stories	Trevor Mooney	Episode: "Consumers"
2001	Law & Order	Tanto	Episode: "Swept Away"
2007	Legally Blonde: The Musical	Emmett Forrest	Filmed stage production
2008	Johnny and the Sprites	Bridge Troll	Episode: "The Bridge Troll"
2012–13	Smash	Tom Levitt	32 episodes
2013	The Sound of Music Live!	Max Detweiler	TV movie
2013	Funny or Die's Billy on the Street	Himself	Episode: "It's Debra Messing, You Gays!"
2013–15	The Good Wife	Carter Schmidt	4 episodes
2014	Lifesaver	Dr. Graham Permenter	Pilot (unreleased)
2014	Lucky Duck	Lucky (voice)	TV movie
2014	Masters of Sex	Frank Masters	3 episodes
2014	Sweeney Todd: The Demon Barber of Fleet Street: Live from Lincoln Center	Adolfo Pirelli	Filmed stage production
2014	Sofia the First	Slickwell (voice)	Episode: "Baileywhoops"
2014	Peter Pan Live!	Smee/George Darling	TV movie
2016	Gilmore Girls: A Year in the Life	Carl	Episode: "Summer"
2017	Falsettos: Live from Lincoln Center	Marvin	Filmed stage production
2017	The Late Show with Stephen Colbert	Himself	Episode: "Jennifer Hudson; Chris Hayes; Christian Borle"
2018	Vampirina	Rusty Topsail (voice)	Episode: "Treasure Haunters"
2018	Younger	Don Ridley	2 episodes
2018	Rapunzel's Tangled Adventure	Father Francis (voice)	Episode: "Freebird"
2018	Elementary	Dr. David Horowitz	Episode: "The Visions of Norman P. Horowitz"
2018–21	The Good Fight	Carter Schmidt	3 episodes
2019	Project Runway All Stars	Himself – Willy Wonka	Episode: "Pure Imagination" (special thanks)
2019	Until the Wedding	Miles	Pilot (not released)
2020	Helpsters	Mail Carrier Marty	Episode: "Primmflandia Day/Marching Band Marsha"
2021	Prodigal Son	Friar Pete	6 episodes
2021	Run the World	Brett	Episode: "Because... ADOS"
2024	Evil	Nell	Episode: "Fear of the Unholy"
2024	Elsbeth	Carter Schmidt	2 episodes
2024–present	Hazbin Hotel	Vox (voice)	Recurring role; 9 episodes

== Discography ==
=== Cast albums ===
- 2003 - Prodigal (Original York Theatre Cast)
- 2003 - Elegies (Original Off-Broadway Cast)
- 2005 - Spamalot (Original Broadway Cast)
- 2007 - Legally Blonde: The Musical (Original Broadway Cast)
- 2013 - Bombshell (Smash TV Cast)
- 2013 - The Sound of Music: Music from the NBC Television Event (2013 TV Cast)
- 2014 - Peter Pan Live! (2014 TV Cast)
- 2015 - Something Rotten! (Original Broadway Cast)
- 2015 - James and the Giant Peach (World Premiere Cast)
- 2016 - A New Brain (2015 Encores! Cast)
- 2016 - Falsettos (Original Broadway Revival Cast)
- 2017 - Charlie and the Chocolate Factory (Original Broadway Cast)
- 2019 - Little Shop of Horrors (The New Off-Broadway Cast)
- 2021 - Dreamland (Studio Cast)
- 2023 - Some Like It Hot (Original Broadway Cast)

=== Soundtrack albums ===
- 2013 - Bombshell
- 2024 - Hazbin Hotel (Original Soundtrack)
- 2025 - Hazbin Hotel: Season Two (Original Soundtrack)

=== Singles ===
- 2013 - "Don't Say Yes Until I've Finished Talking" (featured in Smash Season 1)
- 2013 - "A Love Letter From the Times" (duet with Liza Minnelli, featured in Smash Season 2)
- 2013 - "Vienna" (featured in Smash Season 2)
- 2013 - "The Right Regrets" (duet with Debra Messing, featured in Smash Season 2)
- 2025 - "Hazbin Guarantee (Trust Us)" (with the cast of Hazbin Hotel, featured in Hazbin Hotel Season 2)

== Awards and nominations ==
Year	Award	Category	Work	Result
2005	Drama Desk Award	Outstanding Featured Actor in a Musical	Spamalot	Nominated
2005	Clarence Derwent Award	Most Promising Male	Spamalot	Won
2005	Broadway.com Audience Choice Awards	Favorite Featured Actor in a Broadway Musical	Spamalot	Won
2005	Broadway.com Audience Choice Awards	Favorite Breakthrough Performance (Male)	Spamalot	Nominated
2005	Broadway.com Audience Choice Awards	Favorite Onstage Pair (shared with Hank Azaria)	Spamalot	Nominated
2007	Tony Award	Best Performance by a Featured Actor in a Musical	Legally Blonde	Nominated
2007	Drama Desk Award	Outstanding Featured Actor in a Musical	Legally Blonde	Nominated
2007	Drama League Award	Distinguished Performance	Legally Blonde	Nominated
2010	Broadway.com Audience Choice Awards	Best Replacement	Mary Poppins	Nominated
2011	Tina Award	Best Actor (Play)	Peter and the Starcatcher	Nominated
2011	Tina Award	Best Actor (Play)	Angels in America	Nominated
2011	Tina Award	Best Ensemble (Play)	Angels in America	Won
2011	Tina Award	Best Stage Duo (shared with Zachary Quinto)	Angels in America	Won
2011	Drama League Award	Distinguished Performance	Angels in America	Nominated
2012	Tony Award	Best Performance by a Featured Actor in a Play	Peter and the Starcatcher	Won
2012	Drama Desk Award	Outstanding Featured Actor in a Play	Peter and the Starcatcher	Nominated
2012	Drama League Award	Distinguished Performance	Peter and the Starcatcher	Nominated
2012	Lucille Lortel Awards	Outstanding Lead Actor	Peter and the Starcatcher	Won
2012	Broadway.com Audience Choice Awards	Favorite Funny Performance	Peter and the Starcatcher	Won
2015	Tony Award	Best Performance by a Featured Actor in a Musical	Something Rotten!	Won
2015	Drama Desk Award	Outstanding Featured Actor in a Musical	Something Rotten!	Won
2015	Drama League Award	Distinguished Performance	Something Rotten!	Nominated
2015	Outer Critics Circle Award	Best Actor in a Musical	Something Rotten!	Nominated
2015	Broadway.com Audience Choice Awards	Favorite Featured Actor in a Musical	Something Rotten!	Won
2016	Grammy Award	Best Musical Theater Album	Something Rotten!	Nominated
2017	Tony Award	Best Actor in a Musical	Falsettos	Nominated
2017	Outer Critics Circle Award	Outstanding Actor in a Musical	Falsettos	Nominated
2017	Broadway.com Audience Choice Awards	Favorite Leading Actor in a Musical	Falsettos	Nominated
2017	Broadway.com Audience Choice Awards	Favorite Onstage Pair (shared with Andrew Rannells)	Falsettos	Nominated
2017	Drama League Award	Distinguished Performance	Falsettos	Nominated
2017	Drama League Award	Distinguished Performance	Charlie and the Chocolate Factory	Nominated
2017	Broadway.com Audience Choice Awards	Favorite Funny Performance	Charlie and the Chocolate Factory	Nominated
2020	Drama Desk Award	Outstanding Featured Actor in a Musical	Little Shop of Horrors	Won
2020	Drama League Award	Distinguished Performance	Little Shop of Horrors	Nominated
2020	Outer Critics Circle Award	Outstanding Featured Actor in a Musical	Little Shop of Horrors	Honoree
2020	Lucille Lortel Award	Outstanding Featured Actor in a Musical	Little Shop of Horrors	Won
2023	Tony Award	Best Actor in a Musical	Some Like It Hot	Nominated
2024	Grammy Awards	Best Musical Theater Album	Some Like It Hot	Won
2025	Broadway.com Audience Choice Awards	Favorite Featured Actor in a Musical	Tammy Faye	Nominated
