= David Benoit (disambiguation) =

David Benoit may refer to:

- David Benoit (born 1953), American jazz pianist
- David Benoit (actor) (born 1966), American actor and singer
- David Benoit (basketball) (born 1968), American basketball player

== See also ==
- Benoît David (born 1966), Canadian rock singer
