= Some Like It Hot (disambiguation) =

Some Like It Hot is a 1959 comedy film starring Marilyn Monroe and directed by Billy Wilder.

Some Like It Hot may also refer to:

== Film and television ==
- Some Like It Hot (1939 film), a comedy starring Bob Hope
- Some Like It Hot (2016 film), a Chinese romantic comedy
- Some Like It Hot (TV special), a 2022 American made-for-television parody
- "Some Like It Hot", a Night Court episode
- "Some Like It Hot", an episode of British children's show Chorlton and the Wheelies
- "Some Like It Hot", an episode from Pokémon: Master Quest, the fifth season of the Pokémon anime

== Music ==
=== Songs ===
- "Some Like It Hot", a big band jazz song recorded Feb. 26, 1939 by Gene Krupa, vocal by Irene Daye
- "Some Like It Hot" (song), by Power Station
- "Some Like It Hot", the title tune from the 1959 movie by Matty Malneck and I. A. L. Diamond
- "It's Hot (Some Like It Hot)", a track from Jay-Z's album Vol. 3... Life and Times of S. Carter
- "Some Like It Hot", a 1956 song by rockabilly musician Sammy Masters
- "Some Like It Hot", a song from the 1983 Coney Hatch album Outta Hand

=== Albums ===
- Some Like It Hot (Barney Kessel album), a 1959 album by jazz guitarist Barney Kessel
- Some Like It Hot, an album by Lou McGarity
- Some Like It Hot (cast album), a 2023 album performed by the cast members of the 2022 Broadway musical
- Some Like It Hot, a 2025 album by Bar Italia

== Literature ==
- Some Like It Hot (novel), by Zoey Dean
- Some Like It Hot, a 2006 novel by Lori Wilde
- "Some Like It Hot", a short story from Tales of the Vampires
- "Some Like It Hot", a phrase in the popular 18th-century children's rhyme "Pease Porridge Hot"

== Other arts, entertainment and media ==
- Some Like It Hot (musical), a 2022 musical based on the Billy Wilder film

== See also ==
- "Some Like It Hoth", a 2009 episode of the television series Lost
