= Elegies (William Finn) =

- A Song Cycle
- Music: William Finn
- Lyrics: William Finn
- Premiere: March 2, 2003: Mitzi E. Newhouse Theater, Lincoln Center
- Productions: 2003 Off-Broadway; 2004 Beverly Hills concert; 2004 Boston; 2004 Off-West End; 2005 Philadelphia; 2005 Great Barrington, Massachusetts; 2007 Toronto, Canada; 2010 New York City benefit concert

Elegies is a song cycle by William Finn about the deaths of friends and family, several from AIDS, and in its closing numbers a response to the September 11 attacks. It premiered Off-Broadway at Lincoln Center in 2003 and has since been staged in Beverly Hills, Boston, London, Philadelphia, Great Barrington, Massachusetts, and Toronto, among other venues.

== Background ==
By August 2002, Finn had a song cycle in progress; he described his uncertainty about the project to interviewer Mark Dundas Wood, saying "I don't know whether I'm writing songs or remembrances of people." By January 2003, weeks before the show opened, it was being announced under the working title Looking Up; that announcement also named Christian Borle, Betty Buckley, and Carolee Carmello as confirmed cast members, with Michael Rupert still unofficially attached and Norm Lewis, an earlier prospective cast member, no longer connected to the project. Two of its songs predate the cycle's conception as a unified piece: "Infinite Joy" had already debuted in Finn's 2000 revue Infinite Joy at Joe's Pub, alongside "When the Earth Stopped Turning," likewise drawn into Elegies from earlier material written in memory of Finn's mother, Barbara Finn, who died in May 1998.

== Original production ==
The song cycle began performances at Lincoln Center's Mitzi E. Newhouse Theater in New York City on March 2, 2003, though it did not open for review until March 24. Performances were given on Sunday and Monday nights, when the Newhouse stage was dark for the run of Observe the Sons of Ulster Marching Towards the Somme, and were staged on that production's set, with no separate scenic design credited. The piece was performed without an intermission. Directed by Graciela Daniele, the cast starred Christian Borle, Betty Buckley, Carolee Carmello, Keith Byron Kirk, and Michael Rupert. The initial engagement closed as scheduled on March 30, after nine performances, but the production returned for a further limited run once Observe the Sons of Ulster Marching Towards the Somme closed and vacated the Newhouse, playing through April 19; contemporary accounts differ on the exact schedule and performance count of this return engagement. (Note: One contemporary account describes the return engagement as running "Monday evening, April 14 through Saturday evening, April 19"; another, covering the same closing date, describes it as running Tuesday through Saturday with one Saturday matinee, for seven performances in total.)

Musical direction was by Vadim Feichtner, with vocal arrangements by Gihieh Lee and casting by Jay Binder and Jack Bowdan; the creative team also included costume consultant Toni-Leslie James, lighting consultant Donald Holder, sound consultant Scott Stauffer, and stage manager Patty Lyons, with Lincoln Center Theater presenting under artistic director André Bishop and executive producer Bernard Gersten. In liner notes for the cast recording, Bishop wrote that the piece's original title had been Looking Up, and described the piece, which lacks a book or conventional plot, as "innately theatrical" in Daniele's staging.

Most of the songs were composed in memory of Finn's friends, several of whom died of AIDS. Three songs deal specifically with the death of his mother, Barbara Finn: "Passover", "14 Dwight Ave., Natick, Massachusetts", and "When the Earth Stopped Turning". "Mark's All-Male Thanksgiving" addresses the AIDS crisis directly. The final set of songs deals with the collapse of the World Trade Center and its emotional aftermath. Reviewing a 2004 regional production, one critic described the piece as touching, funny, and ultimately buoyant, ranging in tone from unabashed optimism to hilarious irreverence.

== Musical numbers ==
- "Looking Up Quintet"
- "Mister Choi & Madame G"
- "Mark's All-Male Thanksgiving"
- "Only One"
- "Joe Papp"
- "Peggy Hewitt & Mysty del Giorno"
- "Passover"
- "Infinite Joy"
- "The Ballad of Jack Eric Williams (and other 3-named composers)"
- "Fred" †
- "Elevator Transition" (Note: A song titled "Person in an Elevator" was cut during previews; its melody was retained as the brief "Elevator Transition." A private audience recording of the complete show, dated March 2003 and believed to be from the first or second preview based on its inclusion of this cut song and some performance slips, is catalogued by Ovrtur.) †
- "Dear Reader" †
- "Monica & Mark" (Note: Per Dvoskin's dissertation, this number's narrative includes Monica's husband, Andy, alongside Mark Thalen; a 2003 TheaterMania review accordingly refers to the number as "Andy, Monica and Mark," though the officially released cast recording lists the title as "Monica & Mark.")
- "Anytime (I Am There)"
- "My Dogs"
- "Venice"
- "14 Dwight Ave., Natick, Massachusetts"
- "When the Earth Stopped Turning"
- "Goodbye/Boom Boom"
- "Looking Up"
- "Goodbye (Finale)"

† Not featured on the original Off-Broadway cast recording.

== Main characters represented ==
- Mark Thalen, attorney and gay-rights advocate
  - Bill Sherwood, director/editor/screenwriter of the film Parting Glances
- Joseph Papp, producer and impresario
- Peggy Hewett, (Note: The song title and most secondary sources render her name "Hewitt"; her actual name, per her New York Times and Playbill obituaries, was spelled "Hewett.") character actress best known for A Day in Hollywood/A Night in the Ukraine (1980) and Olympus on My Mind (1986), and for playing Eleanor Roosevelt in Finn's Romance in Hard Times
  - Mystical "Mysty" Del Giorno, (Note: The song title renders her name "Mysty del Giorno"; per her New York Times obituary her full name was "Mystical Del Giorno.") a chiropractor and, per her obituary, Hewett's companion of fifteen years
- Jack Eric Williams, composer and performer
  - Ricky Ian Gordon, composer
  - Quentin Crisp, raconteur, actor, and writer
- Monica Andres, (Note: The old revision of this article spelled her surname "Andress"; her Hartford Courant obituary gives it as "Andres.") a friend of the composer and editor for several Hartford-area publications
- Bolek Greczynski, art therapist and co-founder of the Living Museum at Creedmoor
- Barbara (Cohen) Finn, the composer's mother

== Subsequent productions ==
=== Beverly Hills, 2004 ===
A limited concert engagement at the Canon Theatre in Beverly Hills ran March 26–28, 2004, serving as the historic venue's farewell production before its closure and demolition to make way for a hotel. The cast included Keith Byron Kirk, Celia Keenan-Bolger, Stephen Bogardus, Maureen McGovern, and Brian Beacock. At the close of the final performance, the back wall of the stage was revealed to show the Canon's name above the stage door as the cast sang the closing number, a staging choice reviewers read as the production's own farewell to the venue.

=== Boston, 2004 ===
SpeakEasy Stage Company presented the Boston premiere at the Boston Center for the Arts from May 7 to 29, 2004, directed by Paul Daigneault, with musical direction by Paul S. Katz and production stage management by Dana Elizabeth Wolf. The cast comprised Kerry Dowling, Michael Mendiola, Jose Delgado, Will McGarrahan, and Leigh Barrett.

=== London, 2004 ===
The Off-West End premiere played the Arts Theatre from November 7 to 14, 2004, directed by Jamie Lloyd. The cast included John Barrowman, Peter Caulfield, Ray Shell, Susannah Fellows, and Lauren Ward.

=== Philadelphia, 2005 ===
Philadelphia Theatre Company presented the show at the Plays & Players Theater, with previews beginning March 18, 2005, an official opening on March 23, and a run through April 17, directed by Joe Calarco and reuniting original cast members Michael Rupert and Keith Byron Kirk alongside Sherri L. Edelen, Will Gartshore, and Donna Migliaccio. The creative team comprised James Kronzer (sets), Chris Lee (lights), Anne Kennedy (costumes), Tony Angelini (sound), and Kimberly Grigsby (music director).

=== Great Barrington, Massachusetts, 2005 ===
Barrington Stage Company presented Elegies at the Mahaiwe Performing Arts Center in Great Barrington from August 14 to 28, 2005, directed by Rob Ruggiero with musical direction by Deborah Abramson. The cast included Bradford William Anderson, Sandy Binion, Romain Fruge, Andre Ward, and Sally Wilfert. The production introduced a new song, "I Do, I Do, I Do," written in tribute to James Goldman.

=== Joe's Pub reunion, 2006 ===
Three members of the original cast—Betty Buckley, Michael Rupert, and Christian Borle—reunited for a one-night-only concert presentation at Joe's Pub on December 17, 2006, joined by Darius de Haas and Sally Wilfert.

=== Toronto, 2007 ===
Acting Up Stage Theatre Company presented the Toronto premiere at the Berkeley Street Theatre from February 15 to March 4, 2007, directed by Lezlie Wade with musical direction by Wayne Gwillim. The production was produced by Mitchell Marcus and stage managed by Dot Routledge. The cast comprised Thom Allison, Barbara Barsky, Steven Gallagher, Eliza-Jane Scott, and Michael Strathmore.

=== New York City benefit, 2010 ===
A benefit concert was staged in New York City on August 16, 2010, directed by Michael Rader with musical direction by Eddie Guttman. The production was produced by Jamie McGonnigal and stage managed by David Beris. The cast included Michael Brian Dunn, Darius de Haas, Jason Forbach, AnnMarie Milazzo, and Kerry O'Malley.

== Critical reception and themes ==
The original production received largely positive reviews. In The New York Times, Stephen Holden called the piece "moving and exuberant," praising its lyrics for capturing the idiosyncrasies and vitality of the people being remembered rather than treating them with conventional solemnity. TheaterMania's review was similarly enthusiastic, calling the cycle "breathtaking in the depth and breadth of its commentary" and singling out Betty Buckley's performance of "Infinite Joy" for particular praise.

Scholarly analysis of the piece has focused on its treatment of queerness and historical memory. Writing in the Journal of American Drama and Theatre, Michelle Dvoskin analyzed Elegies as an example of what literary theorist Eve Kosofsky Sedgwick termed "reparative" engagement with history, arguing that the piece resists a strictly chronological, linear structure in favor of an episodic, revue-like form that treats personal and national losses as equally worthy of public mourning. She situates the show's closing sequence, which addresses the September 11 attacks, within scholarship on queer theory and public grief, contending that the sequence's lack of a fixed correspondence between performers and characters allows the ostensibly heterosexual family depicted in "Goodbye/Boom Boom" to carry traces of the queer lives portrayed earlier in the evening, thereby implicitly widening whose losses the show treats as grievable. The show's melancholic approach to loss, particularly in songs such as "Anytime" and "Venice", is read as resisting closure by keeping the dead rhetorically present rather than mourned and released. On attending the 2004 Beverly Hills engagement, Dvoskin further observed that the production's closing number was staged to acknowledge the Canon Theatre's own impending demolition, extending the show's catalogue of grievable losses to the venue itself. Hewett and Del Giorno are cited as an example of the show's marginal or easily overlooked losses, neither famous enough to be widely recognized nor peripheral to Finn's own life; Del Giorno's own obituary separately describes her as Hewett's companion of fifteen years, a detail consistent with the broader argument that the show's scope of grievable loss extends to queer relationships that public commemoration has often overlooked.

== Recordings ==
The original Off-Broadway cast recording was released June 24, 2003, on Fynsworth Alley, distributed through Varèse Sarabande, and was recorded April 28, 2003, at Clinton Recording Studios in New York. Reviewing the album, David Finkle gave it five stars, praising Finn's candidly autobiographical songwriting and describing the recording as spanning the AIDS crisis through the September 11 attacks with a mix of humor and grief. The album omits three songs performed during the run: "Fred," "Elevator Transition," and "Dear Reader." An earlier song titled "Person in an Elevator," survives only on a private audience recording of the complete show, and was truncated to only the "Elevator Transition". A filming of the April 18, 2003 performance is held in the Theatre on Film and Tape Archive at the New York Public Library for the Performing Arts.

A reprise of "Mark's All-Male Thanksgiving" was added to the show sometime after the Lincoln Center run, according to CastAlbums.org; its first recording appeared in 2008 on Gliding: The Winter EP, an independently released, charity-only EP by original cast member Michael Rupert. A studio cast recording of a 2016 production at Interlochen Arts Academy in Interlochen, Michigan, made with Finn's permission, later included this reprise as well, alongside the complete score: the three songs missing from the original cast album, plus "Looking In"—a brief transitional reprise of a lyrical motif from "Mister Choi & Madame G." (Note: The Interlochen recording lists the "Mark's All-Male Thanksgiving" reprise under the title "Thanksgiving (Reprise).") Proceeds from the Interlochen recording were donated to Broadway Cares/Equity Fights AIDS, and proceeds from Rupert's EP to the Marine Toys for Tots Foundation.
