= Craig Chester =

American actor, writer, and screenwriter

- Born: November 8, 1965 (age 61); West Covina, California, US
- Education: The American Academy of Dramatic Arts
- Occupations: Actor, writer, screenwriter

Craig Chester (born November 8, 1965) is an American actor, writer, and screenwriter.

== Early life ==
Chester was born in West Covina, California, the son of Cecil, lead singer in the rock band "Whiskey", and Linda, a homemaker. He moved with his family to Carrollton, Texas, at the age of twelve when his father accepted a corporate job with Nestlé. At age fifteen, Chester was diagnosed with the facial deformity long face syndrome. The condition's most striking symptom is an excessively long lower face height. At eighteen, Chester spent a year undergoing multiple reconstructive surgeries. Chester moved to New York City in 1985, with a new face, to study at The American Academy of Dramatic Arts. Following graduation, he performed in various stage productions in New York, including a play written by Joanne Woodward who, upon noticing his naturalistic acting style, encouraged Chester to pursue a career in film.

== Career ==
Chester's acting debut was in the feature film Swoon, a contemporary re-telling of the infamous Leopold & Loeb murder case, which earned Chester an Independent Spirit Award nomination for Best Actor. Janet Maslin of The New York Times described the film as "dazzling". Peter Travers of Rolling Stone described Swoon as "a great film...haunting and visionary". Chester went on to act in a string of critically acclaimed independent films. He has been openly gay since the inception of his career, rare at that time.

As a result, St. Martin's Press approached Chester to write about his life and experiences. His memoir Why the Long Face?: The Adventures of a Truly Independent Actor was published in 2003. In 2009, Showtime optioned the book with Chester set to adapt it into a television pilot with Don Roos, Dan Bucatinsky and Lisa Kudrow as producers. Publishers Weekly described Why The Long Face as "witty, absorbing" with Chester an "engaging storyteller with a fresh voice". Kirkus Reviews described Chester's memoir as an "intriguing midpoint autobiography sure to rouse curiosity about what the next half has in store."

Chester transitioned into screenwriting with Adam & Steve, which he also directed and starred in with Parker Posey, Chris Kattan and Malcolm Gets. The film was released on April 24, 2005. Writing for The Village Voice, Melissa Levine described writer-director Chester's debut as "truly enjoyable", while Ronnie Scheib of Variety praised his performance: "Chester's Adam, effortlessly able to slide from bathos to pathos and back again with none of the smarmy schmaltz of sitcom humanism, is a marvel of nuanced comic timing." Chuck Wilson, writing for LA Weekly described the film as "something certain to make John Waters cackle with glee." Adam & Steve has since developed a cult following.

Since adapting his book for Showtime, Chester has been writing for television. He wrote for season seven of the hit HBO series, True Blood and has developed pilots with NBC and Ryan Seacrest for E! amongst others. On the June 5, 2013, edition of NPR's "Moth Radio Hour", Chester recounted how he has been haunted by the Academy Award-nominated actor, Montgomery Clift, who has been dead for over 40 years.

In 2021, Chester shared that he had experienced homelessness for several months, beginning in mid-2019.

In early 2024, Michael Musto announced that a sequel to "Adam & Steve" was in development and that Chester had penned the screenplay, titled "Adam & Steve 55+".

== Filmography ==
Year	Title	Role	Notes
1992	Swoon	Nathan Leopold Jr.	
1993	Grief	Mark	
1994	Out of Darkness	Bill	TV film
1995	Frisk	Henry	
1996	I Shot Andy Warhol	Fred Hughes	
1997	David Searching	Mercedes Guy	
1997	Kiss Me, Guido	Terry	
1998	The Misadventures of Margaret	Richard Lane	
1998	Shucking the Curve	Steven	
1999	Charlie!		
2001	The Anniversary Party	Party Guest	
2001	Circuit	White Party Customer	
2001	The Experience Box	Ryan	
2001	Sex and the City "Coulda, Woulda, Shoulda"	Hermes Clerk	TV series
2002	Bumping Heads	Craig	short film, 22 minutes; released in 2003 in Boys Life 4: Four Play
2002	Law & Order: Criminal Intent "Phantom" "Anti-Thesis"	Thor; Derek	TV series
2003	The Look	Henrik	
2003	Quintessence	Thomas	short film, 25 minutes
2004	Anonymous	Auditor	
2004	Out on the Edge		writer
2005	Adam & Steve	Adam Bernstein	actor; writer; director
2007	Save Me		writer
2007–2008	The Big Gay Sketch Show		writer (9 episodes)
2008	Pedro	Counselor	
2013	Kill Your Darlings	Businessman	
2021	Cam Boy	Wegman	
