= David Benoit (actor) =

American actor and singer (born 1966)

- Born: 1966 (age 59–60); Fall River, Massachusetts, U.S.
- Occupations: Actor, singer, musician
- Years active: 1992–present

David Benoit (born 1966) is an American actor and singer most known for being a replacement in the original Broadway run of Les Miserables. His most recent Broadway credit is playing the Bishop and Spider in the Broadway revival of Jekyll & Hyde.

== Early life and education ==
Benoit, who accepts both the Americanized (pronounced "Benoyt") and French (pronounced "Benois") pronunciations of his name, was born in Fall River, Massachusetts and lived on Raymond Street for four years before moving to nearby Somerset, Massachusetts with his father, a bus driver, his mother, two sisters and a brother.

He graduated from Boston Conservatory in 1988 with a degree in musical theatre and moved to New York City. He also had 8 years of tuba playing and is somewhat of an amateur puppet maker, having made his own puppets while in Forbidden Broadway.

== Acting career ==
After moving to New York in the summer of 1992, he worked on Broadway and touring companies of shows such as Forbidden Broadway, Forever Plaid, Dance of the Vampires, All Shook Up, Avenue Q, Les Miserables, Young Frankenstein, Jekyll & Hyde and Phantom of the Opera. He also performed in the Actor's Fund concert of Dreamgirls.

== Stage credits ==
=== Broadway ===
- Les Misérables (1997–2002) --
  The Bishop of Digne/Montparnasse/Diner
  Understudy Javert & Thenardier
  (Replacement)
- Dance of the Vampires (2002) -- as Villager, Vampire and Creature of the Night
- Avenue Q (2007) -- as Bear/Nicky/Trekkie Monster (Replacement)
- Jekyll & Hyde (2013) -- as Bishop of Basingstoke, Spider

=== Off-Broadway ===
- Forever Plaid—as Sparky (Replacement)
- Forbidden Broadway 1992 (1992) -- Replacement
- The Big Bang (2000) -- as Jed (Understudy)
- Forbidden Broadway Summer Shock! (2004)

=== Regional/ National Tours ===
- The Nerd (1989) -- as Rick Steadman (Merrimack Repertory Theatre)
- 1940's Radio Hour (1989) (musical) --as Neal Tilden (Worcester Foothills Theatre)
- 1940's Radio Hour (musical) (1989) --as Clifton Feddington (Chisiwick Park Theatre)
- Tomfoolery (musical) (1989) (Worcester Foothills Theatre)
- Little Shop of Horrors (musical) (1989) --as Orin Scrivello and others (Nickerson Theatre)
- Jesus Christ Superstar (musical) (1990) --as King Herod (American Stage Festival)
- Forbidden Broadway (musical) (1990–91) (Boston Park Plaza)
- Forever Plaid (musical) --as Sparky (1992) (Boston Park Plaza)
- A Funny Thing Happened on the Way to the Forum (musical) 1993—as Pseudolus (Merrimack Repertory Theatre)
- Forbidden Broadway (musical) (1994) (Olde Towne Theatre)
- Forbidden Hollywood (musical) (1995) (Appollo Theatre)
- Forbidden Broadway Strikes Back! (1996–97) (Boston Park Plaza)
- The Spitfire Grill (2003) -- as Caleb Thorpe (Arkansas Repertory Theatre)
- Les Miserables (musical) (2004) Monsieur Thenardier (National Tour)
- Avenue Q (2005–2006) --as Nicky Trekkie (Wynn Las Vegas)
- All Shook Up (2007) -- (National Tour)
- Avenue Q (2007–2009) --as Nicky/Trekkie (National Tour)
- Citizen Ruth (2009) -- (Minetta Lane Theatre)
- Adding Machine (2009) -- as Mr. Zero (Studio Theatre)
- The Great American Trailer Park Musical (2010) -- as Norbert (SpeakEasy Stage Company)
- Young Frankenstein (2010) -- as Kemp/Blind Hermit (National Tour)
- A Funny Thing Happened on the Way to the Forum (2011) -- as Miles Gloriosus (Weston Playhouse Theatre Company)
- Camelot (2011) -- as Merlyn/Pellinore (John W. Engeman Theater)
- A Christmas Carol (2011) -- as Ebeneezer Scrooge (Arkansas Repertory Theatre)
- Jekyll & Hyde (2012) --as Bishop/Spider (National Tour)
- 42nd Street (2013) as Abner Dillon (Weston Playhouse Theatre Company)
- Fiddler on the Roof (2013) -- as Tevye (Virginia Repertory Theatre)
- Billy Elliot (2014) -- as Big Davey (Ogunquit Playhouse)
- Romance in Hard Times (2014) -- as Polly (Barrington Stage Company)
- The Phantom of the Opera (2015) -- as Monsieur Firmin (National Tour)
- Sweeney Todd: The Demon Barber of Fleet Street (musical) (2017) -- as Sweeney Todd (Olney Theatre Center)
- Girl from the North Country (2023–2024) -- as Mr. Burke (National Tour)
