= Adam & Steve =

- Film poster
- Directed by: Craig Chester
- Written by: Craig Chester
- Produced by: George Bendele; Kirkland Tibbels
- Starring: Chris Kattan; Malcolm Gets; Parker Posey; Craig Chester
- Cinematography: Carl Bartels; Brian Pryzpek
- Edited by: Phyllis Housen
- Music by: Roddy Bottum
- Distributed by: TLA Releasing
- Release date: April 24, 2005
- Running time: 99 minutes
- Country: United States
- Language: English
- Box office: $330,116

Adam & Steve is a 2005 American romantic comedy film directed by and starring Craig Chester, who also wrote the screenplay. It deals with the lives of two gay men, played by Chester and Malcolm Gets. The film had its UK premiere on November 19, 2005, at the Cardiff Film Festival, but was not on general release in the UK.

== Plot ==
In 1987, Adam (Craig Chester), a shy, cynical, Jewish kid, encounters Steve (Malcolm Gets), an attractive Dazzle Dancer performing at Danceteria one night. The two flirt and go back to Adam's apartment to have sex, with Steve offering Adam the latter's first hit of cocaine. Unbeknownst to Steve, the cocaine is cut with baby laxative, resulting in Steve losing control of his bowels and explosively defecating all over Adam's apartment. Humiliated, Steve flees.

Seventeen years later, Adam is a jaded ex-substance addict working as a New York City tour guide, and Steve has become a successful psychiatrist. By sheer coincidence, the two meet when Adam accidentally stabs his dog and Steve, who dabbled in veterinary medicine, treats the animal at the hospital. Both Adam and Steve fail to recognize each other from their previous meeting.

Adam and Steve strike a fast friendship and begin dating, eventually falling in love; Steve introduces Adam to his latently religious parents, and Adam introduces Steve to his disaster-prone family. Rhonda (Parker Posey) and Michael (Chris Kattan)—Adam and Steve's respective best friends—are initially wary of the other's friend and openly hostile toward one another, but soon themselves fall in love and begin dating.

Steve's feelings for Adam grow, and eventually he confides in Michael and Rhonda that he plans to propose marriage to Adam. On the Brooklyn Bridge, however, right as Steve prepares to propose to Adam, Adam absentmindedly muses that his entire litany of substance abuse and relationship problems were sparked by his disastrous affair with an incontinent Dazzle Dancer back in 1987. In that instant, Steve realizes who Adam is; horrified at this revelation, and feeling responsible for all of Adam's problems, Steve abruptly breaks up with Adam.

Adam falls into despair until Rhonda wheedles the truth about Steve's past from Michael; she and Michael reveal all to Adam. Adam angrily confronts Steve, who is apologetic, but still upset and scared by feelings of responsibility for Adam's problem-filled life.

Adam is still upset and prepared to give up on their relationship, but Steve apologizes more humbly and professes his love to Adam (buffeted by singing a piano-accompanied version of the song "Something Good"); Adam softens and accepts. Steve moves forward with his marriage proposal. The film ends with the two marrying in an outdoor ceremony, with all their friends and family in attendance.

== Cast ==
- Craig Chester as Adam Bernstein
- Malcolm Gets as Steve Hicks
- Parker Posey as Rhonda
- Chris Kattan as Michael
- Kristen Schaal as Ruth
- Julie Hagerty as Sherry
- Paul Sand as Norm
- Noah Segan as Twink
- Sally Kirkland as Mary
- Jackie Beat as herself
- Mario Diaz as Orlando
- Lisa Frederickson as Fiona
- Sandy Martin as Biker Chick
- Michael Panes as Lou
- Jennifer Echols as Triage Nurse
- Jack Guzman as Security Guard
- Maxine Prescott as Elderly Lady
- The Dazzle Dancers as The Dazzle Dancers

== Reception ==
Adam & Steve grossed $309,404 after 16 weeks in American theaters in a maximum of 17 screens. It grossed $66,429 in its opening weekend in the U.S. (and widest release) on March 31, 2006. As of October 8, 2009 it is the third biggest grossing film of all time from the TLA Releasing Studio behind Another Gay Movie and the top-grossing Latter Days.

As of June 2020, the film holds a 55% approval rating on Rotten Tomatoes, based on 38 reviews with an average rating of 5.43 out of 10. The website's critics consensus reads: "Gross-out comedy and true love make for an awkward mix in this clunky romance."

== See also ==
- Adam and Steve (phrase)
