= Andrew MacBean =

Canadian theatre director and writer

Andrew MacBean (born 7 February 1963) is a Canadian theatre director and writer.

== Life and career ==
Born in Toronto, Ontario on 7 February 1963, he attended Queen's University, where he received a B.A. in Drama and Music. He then studied directing as an intern at Playwright's Horizons, in New York City, and was a senior member of the BMI musical theatre workshop, first under Lehman Engel, then Maury Yeston.

He can be heard on the original-cast recording of Anne of Green Gables – The Musical, as Gilbert Blythe, a role he performed for three years, as well as creating the award-winning musical Sleeping Arrangements, which premiered at the Charlottetown Festival and ran for three years.

He founded Theatreworks in London, England in the 1990s. He was associate director with Trevor Nunn on Andrew Lloyd Webber's Aspects of Love and Sunset Boulevard. He then worked as Trevor Nunn's associate director on Anything Goes at the Royal National Theatre and Theatre Royal, Drury Lane.

He has also done corporate work as a writer/director with Coca-Cola worldwide, Jaguar and Samsung.

He is the creator of the musical Raindogs, which was featured at the MAD Fringe Festival at the Trafalgar Studios in August 2008. Subsequently, it was showcased at the Bay Street Theater, Sag Harbor New York and most recently by Theatre20 and Sheridan College in Toronto, 2012, and in Los Angeles, Nov 2013. It features additional music by Paul Chant and Boko Suzuki. As a freelance director, he directs plays and musicals: in 2007, he directed a 50th Anniversary production of West Side Story, and directed The Sound of Music with a London cast taken to Cyprus. In 2008, he worked with William Finn directing the West End premiere of Finn's Make Me a Song, featuring West End stars Sally Ann Triplett, Frances Ruffelle, Simon Thomas, Gareth Snook, Louise Dearman, and Ian H. Watkins.
