= Oh No! It's an Alien Invasion =

Canadian television series

- Title card
- Genre: Comedy; Sci-fi; Adventure
- Created by: Philippe Ivanusic-Vallée; Peter Ricq
- Directed by: Adrian Thatcher
- Voices of: Al Mukadam; Dan Chameroy; Seán Cullen; Stacey DePass; Barbara Mamabolo; Robert Tinkler; Ryan Cooley; Brianna D'Aguanno
- Theme music composer: Brett Carruthers; Stephany Seki
- Opening theme: "Oh No! It's an Alien Invasion!"
- Ending theme: "Oh No! It's an Alien Invasion!" (instrumental)
- Composer: Neil Parfitt
- Country of origin: Canada
- No. of seasons: 2
- No. of episodes: 40 (80 segments)

Production
- Executive producers: Doug Murphy (episodes 1–13); Colin Bohm; Irene Weibel (episodes 14–40); For YTV: Matt Sheppo; Dan Santat
- Producer: Vanessa Esteves
- Running time: 22 minutes
- Production company: Nelvana

Original release
- Network: YTV (season 1); Teletoon (season 2)
- Release: August 3, 2013 – April 30, 2015

Oh No! It's an Alien Invasion is a Canadian animated television series which first aired on August 3, 2013, with its first season of 26 episodes with 52 segments each. The series was created by Philippe Ivanusic-Vallée and Peter Ricq and produced by Nelvana in association with YTV.

The series was pulled from YTV's schedule on August 30, 2014. The second season premiered on Teletoon (now Cartoon Network) on November 3, 2014. The series ended on April 27, 2015, and was canceled on April 30, 2015, ending on an unresolved cliffhanger. 40 episodes with two segments in each were produced, resulting in 80 segments.

== Plot ==
A brain-jarred alien race, known as the Brainlings, has invaded Earth and abducted every adult at the behest of their idiotic manchild ruler Emperor Brainlius III, who wants to throw wild parties, and his general, Briiian, who actually wants to rule the planet. However, a ragtag squad of kids have joined forces and taken refuge inside a mall known as the "Swell-Mart" to form the Super Wicked Extreme Emergency Team (S.W.E.E.T.). Their mission: rid Earth of the Brainling menace and rescue their parents.

== Cast ==
- Nate (voiced by Al Mukadam) - The leader of the Super Wicked Extreme Emergency Team, Nate is an optimistic paranormal enthusiast who's determined to lead his friends to victory and take back the planet from the Brainlings.
- Briiian (voiced by Dan Chameroy) - The general of the Brainling Empire's armies, and responsible for the capture of almost every adult on Earth, Brian is maniacal and conniving, hating S.W.E.E.T. and other humans with a passion. Too bad he's only the general to the armies of an irritating manchild of an emperor.
- Emperor Brainlius III (voiced by Seán Cullen) - Brainlius is the fat, childish and cheerful ruler of all Brainlings. He is insane manchild who prefers throwing parties and passing gas rather than actually ruling the planet, much to Briiian's chargrin, but often throws tantrums when he doesn't get what he wants.
- Turret (voiced by Stacey DePass) - S.W.E.E.T.'s toughest member, an action-loving tomboy who enjoys blasting Brainlings with her personal weapon, the Dirty Undies Cannon. However, she has a softer side, often displayed by her crush on Shakes.
- Scoop (voiced by Barbara Mamabolo) - S.W.E.E.T.'s resident fashionista who's still a valuable asset to the team despite her ditzyness.
- Shakes (voiced by Robert Tinkler) - A cowardly individual and Nate's best friend, Shakes (true to his name) is often shaking when facing against the Brainlings, but always manages to pull through and support the team however he can.
- Louis (voiced by Ryan Cooley) - The team's resident genius who communicates tactics back at the Swell-Mart, as well as keeping tabs on the Brainlings and building gadgets and weapons to combat the aliens.
- Lily (voiced by Brianna Daguanno) - Nate's little sister, who is cute, but also a force to be reckoned with, especially if anyone dare lay a finger on her unicorn doll Clarence.

== Series overview ==
Season	Segments	Episodes	Originally released (Canada)	
Season	Segments	Episodes	First released	Last released
1	52	26	August 3, 2013	December 8, 2014
2	28	14	April 27, 2015	April 30, 2015

== Episodes ==
=== Season 1 (2013–14) ===
No. overall	No. in season	Title	Original release date
1	1	"Bak 2 Skool / Operation Dress Up"	August 3, 2013
When S.W.E.E.T. realizes that they've been getting dumber, they decide to do the impossible: start their own school in the Swell Mart./SWEET decides to bait the Brainlings into revealing their secret adult-prison by pretending to be adults.
2	2	"No Boys (or Aliens) Allowed / Go-Farts"	August 10, 2013
When the girls start their own club, the boys suspect that they're secretly scheming for domination for the entire Swell-Mart./When the Swell-Mart begins losing power, SWEET tries to retrieve an alien power source called Scoof, made from Brainling farts.
3	3	"Pop Goes the Brainling / Robofolks"	August 17, 2013
Rusty Cheevers, the biggest pop sensation in the city, is secretly in cahoots with Briiian to finally capture and defeat SWEET!/When the Swell-Mart has become a pigsty due to no parents, Louis creates Robofolks to clean things up.
4	4	"The Royal Flush / The "Stache""	August 24, 2013
5	5	"Space Ramp / My Fair Ladyling"	August 31, 2013
6	6	"Makin' Movies / Turn It Down"	September 7, 2013
7	7	"The Spandexter / Scoop's Scoop"	September 14, 2013
8	8	"Super Jumbo Ninja / Emperor for a Day"	September 21, 2013
9	9	"Brain Flu / Chef Shakes"	September 28, 2013
10	10	"Brainlings on Ice / Brainlings on Parade"	October 5, 2013
11	11	"Grandpa Ghost / Night of the Werevambies"	October 12, 2013
12	12	"Unitron / Dan the Man"	October 19, 2013
13	13	"Free Gorthax / The Switcheroo"	October 26, 2013
14	14	"Lord of the Loops / Harmoniator"	November 20, 2014
15	15	"Raiders of the Lost and Found / Aliens in the Bunker"	November 21, 2014
16	16	"The Brainling Book of Records / The Champ Is Here"	November 24, 2014
17	17	"Flex Hammerstone Bounty Hunter / Informer-cial"	November 25, 2014
18	18	"Calling Mr. Crash / Lord of the Fleas"	November 26, 2014
19	19	"The Great Escape / Scoop's World"	November 27, 2014
20	20	"Going Viral / Team Turret"	November 28, 2014
21	21	"Smell Mart / Oh Yes!"	December 1, 2014
22	22	"Ho Oh No / Countdown to Terror"	December 2, 2014
23	23	"Artsy Fartsy / Joyride"	December 3, 2014
24	24	"The Plunger Games / Mufflings"	December 4, 2014
25	25	"Space Trash / The King and Bri"	December 5, 2014
A giant asteroid of trash threatens to destroy Earth. S.W.E.E.T. must swoop into space to save the day.
26	26	"Briiian Mart Part 1 / Briiian Mart Part 2"	December 8, 2014
When Nate posts a survival wiki guide, Briiian gets his hands on it, allowing him to finally find the Swell-Mart and convert it into a giant flying mall. SWEET must team up with past allies to get their base back.

=== Season 2 (2015) ===
No. overall	No. in season	Title	Original release date
27	1	"The Assistant / Hiccups"	April 27, 2015
28	2	"In Brain We Trust / The Shakedown"	April 27, 2015
29	3	"The Future Is Now / The Boogieguard"	April 27, 2015
30	4	"Brainlius 3,4 5 / Diary Drama"	April 27, 2015
31	5	"The Green Blur / Head of the Household"	April 28, 2015
32	6	"Food Court / Lost in the Hood"	April 28, 2015
33	7	"It's Another Alien Invasion / Brainception"	April 28, 2015
34	8	"Brain Bros / Swell Mart PD"	April 28, 2015
35	9	"Lily's Bday / Just Goest to (Pet) Show"	April 29, 2015
36	10	"Dance Craze / Bike Psyche"	April 29, 2015
37	11	"Bandemonium / Dash Date"	April 29, 2015
38	12	"Stink Mouth / Brainlius the Musical"	April 29, 2015
39	13	"Fangs But No Fangs / Grandpa Ghost 2"	April 30, 2015
40	14	"Sweet Swap / The Belly Bag"	April 30, 2015

== Broadcast ==
In the United Kingdom, it premiered on May 24, 2014 on Pop and Kix (now Pop Max). It also aired on ABC3 (now ABC Entertains) in Australia. As of 2026, the series is currently available to watch on Amazon Prime Video.

== Awards ==
Oh No! It's an Alien Invasion was nominated for a Canadian Screen Award in the category of "Best Writing in a Children's or Youth Program or Series" for the episodes "Unitron" and "Dan the Man".
