= Dan Chameroy =

Canadian actor (born 1970)

- Born: November 12, 1970 (age 56); Edmonton, Alberta, Canada
- Occupation: Actor
- Years active: 1991–present
- Spouse: Christine Donato
- Children: 1

Dan Chameroy (born November 12, 1970) is a Canadian actor, best known for his work in musical theatre. In 1995, he originated the role of Gaston in the Canadian premiere production of Beauty and the Beast at the Princess of Wales Theatre. Chameroy also originated the role of Miss Trunchbull in the Canadian premiere production of Matilda at the Ed Mirvish Theatre, and reprised the role in the show's first national tour. He has also co-created and performed as the character "Plumbum" at several Ross Petty pantomimes.

Chameroy has appeared in several musical theatre productions across Canada, mostly in Ontario. He has appeared in 29 productions at Stratford Festival, including leading roles in Oklahoma, The Rocky Horror Show, Billy Elliot, Little Shop of Horrors, and Chicago. He has appeared in 4 shows with Mirvish Productions, including Beauty and the Beast and Matilda. He has also appeared productions with the Canadian Stage Company, the Shaw Festival, and the Soulpepper Theatre Company.

== Early and personal life ==
Chameroy was born in Edmonton, Alberta. His parents enrolled him in tap dancing when he was a child, which prompted his interest in performing. After this, he starting doing more plays, musicals, and improv.

He is married to Canadian actress Christine Donato, who he met in 1991 during the Canadian production of Les Misérables. They have one daughter, Olivia.

== Career ==
=== Theatre ===
Chameroy made his professional theatre debut in the Canadian premiere production of Les Misérables, which played at the Royal Alexandra Theatre in Toronto. He was with the show between 1991 and 1992, where he was a member of the ensemble and understudied Enjolras. In 1995, Chameroy originated the role of Gaston in the Canadian premiere production of Beauty and the Beast, which played at the Princess of Wales Theatre. For his performance, Chameroy won a Dora Award for Best Leading Actor.

In 1997, Chameroy made his Stratford Festival debut when he appeared as Lancelot du Lac in their production of Camelot. Between 2002 and 2008, Chameroy appeared in 14 productions with the Stratford Festival. This included prominent roles as Gaston Lachailles in Gigi, Posthumus in Cymbeline, and the leading role of Curly McLain in Oklahoma!. He also starred as Martin Townsend in the world premiere production of Palmer Park, written by Joanna Glass, which premiered at the Stratford Festival in 2008.

In 2004, he appeared in the musical revue Side by Side by Sondheim presented by the Canadian Stage Company.

In 2006 and 2007, Chameroy starred in two Shaw Festival productions, which included starring as C.K. Dexter Haven in their 2006 production of High Society.

In 2009, he played Miles Gloriosus in the Stratford Festival's production of A Funny Thing Happened on the Way to the Forum. Due to popular demand, the musical's run was extended by an extra week. Chameroy reprised his role when the production transferred to Toronto, where it played at the Canon Theatre between December 15, 2010 and January 16, 2011.

In 2014, Chameroy starred as Bobby in a production of Company, produced by Theatre 20 and the Canadian Stage Company. The musical, playing in Toronto for the first time in 30 years, also starred Louise Pitre, Brent Carver, Nia Vardalos, and Chameroy's wife, Christine Donato.

In 2016, Chameroy originated the role of Miss Trunchbull in the Canadian premiere production of Matilda the Musical. The musical opened at the Ed Mirvish Theatre on July 5, 2016 and closed on January 7, 2017. For his performance, Chameroy was nominated for Outstanding Male Performance in a Musical. He then reprised his role of Miss Trunchbull on the first national tour of the musical, joining the tour in 2017.

In 2017, Chameroy starred as Frank Carter in the world premiere production of Life After. At the 2018 Dora Awards, Chameroy was nominated for Outstanding Performance (Male) in a Musical.

In 2018, Chameroy starred as Frank 'n' Furter in a production of The Rocky Horror Show at the Stratford Festival. The show was extended three times before eventually closing on December 2, 2018, which made it the longest running show in Stratford's history. The following year, he starred as Jackie Elliott in Billy Elliot the Musical and as Orin Scrivello in Little Shop of Horrors at Stratford.

Chameroy appeared as Phil Sullivan / Antipholus of Ephesus in The Comedy of Errors at the Chicago Shakespeare Theater. Later in 2023, Chameroy performed as Count Carl-Magnus Malcolm in a concert staging of A Little Night Music at The Royal Conservatory of Music.

==== Ross Petty pantomimes ====
Plumbum is a character created and performed by Chameroy for Ross Petty's annual holiday pantomime shows in Toronto. In the spirit of the pantomime dame, Plumbum is a female character with an over-the-top comedic style and dressed in flamboyant costumes. Plumbum often adlibs and breaks the fourth wall with the audience. The character has received positive reception from both critics and audiences, with praise directed at Chameroy's portrayal and comedic timing.

Chameroy first appeared as Plumbum in Petty's 2008 pantomime production of Cinderella. Based on the positive reception, Chameroy has become a recurring character in Petty's productions. Plumbum has appeared in 11 productions, namely Cinderella (2008), Robin Hood (2009), The Wizard of Oz (2011), The Little Mermaid (2013), Cinderella (2014), Peter Pan (2015), A Christmas Carol (2017), There's No Place Like Home for the Holidays (2020), Alice in Winterland (2021), Peter's Final Flight (2022), and The Wizard of Oz (2025).

=== Television and film ===
Chameroy has voiced characters in several animated shows. For the CBC Kids live-action series, Mittens and Pants, he voiced several characters including Monsieur LaFleur. He also voiced Briian in the YTV series Oh No! It's an Alien Invasion, Aunt Lydia and Dr. Gillman in the Disney Channel series Hotel Transylvania, and Kit in the PBS Kids series Work It Out Wombats!.

His first major acting role was a guest appearance as Kenny Dolan in the Fox drama series Class of '96. Chameroy also appeared as Theodore "Laurie" Laurence in the drama series, Little Men, which aired between 1998 and 1999.

In 2020, Chameroy co-created and starred in the web series Leer Estates, produced by Stratford Festival. Chameroy appeared as all of the characters in the series, which has been described as an absurdist soap opera.

=== Music ===
In 2003, Chameroy released a solo album, me, which consisted of various musical songs.

== Theatre credits ==
Year	Production	Role	Location	Category	Ref.
1991–92	Les Misérables	Ensemble, understudy Enjolras	Royal Alexandra Theatre	Mirvish Productions	
1995	Into the Woods	Steward	St. Lawrence Centre for the Arts	Canadian Stage Company	
1995	Into the Woods	Steward	Max Bell Theatre	Theatre Calgary	
1995–97	Beauty and the Beast	Gaston	Princess of Wales Theatre	Mirvish Productions	
1997	Camelot	Lancelot du Lac	Festival Theatre	Stratford Festival	
1997	Coriolanus	Lieutenant	Tom Patterson Theatre	Stratford Festival	
2001	The Drowsy Chaperone	Robert Martin	Winter Garden Theatre	Regional	
2002	Henry VI: Revenge in France	Earl of Westmoreland	Tom Patterson Theatre	Stratford Festival	
2002	Henry VI: Revolt in England	Sir Humphrey Stafford	Tom Patterson Theatre	Stratford Festival	
2003	Gigi	Gaston Lachailles	Avon Theatre	Stratford Festival	
2003	The Hunchback of Notre Dame	Pierre Gringoire	Avon Theatre	Stratford Festival	
2004	Timon of Athens	Ventidus / 4th Senator	Tom Patterson Theatre	Stratford Festival	
2004	Cymbeline	Posthumus	Tom Patterson Theatre	Stratford Festival	
2004	King John	French Herald	Tom Patterson Theatre	Stratford Festival	
2004	Side by Side by Sondheim		Bluma Appel Theatre	Canadian Stage Company	
2005	As You Like It	Amiens	Festival Theatre	Stratford Festival	
2005	The Tempest	Boatswain	Festival Theatre	Stratford Festival	
2005	The Lark	Executioner	Festival Theatre	Stratford Festival	
2006	High Society	C.K. Dexter Haven	Festival Theatre	Shaw Festival	
2006	The Magic Fire	General Henri Fontannes	Court House Theatre	Shaw Festival	
2007	Oklahoma!	Curly McLain	Festival Theatre	Stratford Festival	
2008	The Trojan Women	understudy Menelaus	Tom Patterson Theatre	Stratford Festival	
2008	Fuente Ovejuna	Don Manrique	Tom Patterson Theatre	Stratford Festival	
2008	Palmer Park	Martin Townsend	Studio Theatre	World premiere: Stratford Festival	
2008	Cinderella	Plumbum	Elgin Theatre	Ross Petty Productions	
2009	West Side Story	Lt. Schrank	Festival Theatre	Stratford Festival	
2009	A Funny Thing Happened on the Way to the Forum	Miles Gloriosus	Avon Theatre	Stratford Festival	
2009	Robin Hood	Plumbum	Elgin Theatre	Ross Petty Productions	
2010	As You Like It	Ensemble	Festival Theatre	Stratford Festival	
2010	The Winter's Tale	Polixenes	Tom Patterson Theatre	Stratford Festival	
2010–11	A Funny Thing Happened on the Way to the Forum	Miles Gloriosus	Canon Theatre	Mirvish Productions	
2011	Camelot	Sir Dinadan	Festival Theatre	Stratford Festival	
2011	The Merry Wives of Windsor	Ensign Pistol, understudy Frank Ford	Festival Theatre	Stratford Festival	
2011	The Wizard of Oz	Plumbum	Elgin Theatre	Ross Petty Productions	
2012	Wanderlust	Dan McGrew	Tom Patterson Theatre	World premiere: Stratford Festival	
2012	The Arsonists	Joseph Schmitz / Fire Brigade	Bluma Appel Theatre	Canadian Stage Company	
2013	The Barber of Seville	Figaro	Young Centre for the Performing Arts	Soulpepper Theatre Company	
2013	Farther West	Babcock	Young Centre for the Performing Arts	Soulpepper Theatre Company	
2013	The Little Mermaid	Plumbum	Elgin Theatre	Ross Petty Productions	
2014	Idiot's Delight	Harry Van	Young Centre for the Performing Arts	Soulpepper Theatre Company	
2014	Company	Robert	Berkeley Street Theatre	Canadian Stage Company/Theatre 20	
2014	Cinderella	Plumbum	Elgin Theatre	Ross Petty Productions	
2015	The Wild Party	Mr. Black	Berkeley Street Theatre	Canadian Stage Company, Musical Stage Company	
2015	Peter Pan	Plumbum	Elgin Theatre	Ross Petty Productions	
2016–17	Matilda the Musical	Miss Trunchbull	Ed Mirvish Theatre	Mirvish Productions	
2017	Matilda the Musical	Miss Trunchbull	First National Tour		
2017	Life After	Frank Carter	Berkeley Street Theatre	World premiere: Canadian Stage Company	
2017	A Christmas Carol	Plumbum	Elgin Theatre	Ross Petty Productions	
2018	The Rocky Horror Show	Frank 'N' Furter	Avon Theatre	Stratford Festival	
2019	Billy Elliot the Musical	Jackie Elliot	Festival Theatre	Stratford Festival	
2019	Little Shop of Horrors	Orin Scrivello	Avon Theatre	Stratford Festival	
2020	There's No Place Like Home for the Holidays	Plumbum	Virtual revue	Ross Petty Productions	
2021	Alice in Winterland	Plumbum	Virtual revue	Ross Petty Productions	
2022	Chicago	Billy Flynn	Festival Theatre	Stratford Festival	
2022	Peter's Final Flight: The Pan-Tastical Family Musical	Plumbum	Elgin Theatre	Ross Petty Productions	
2023	A Comedy of Errors	Phil Sullivan / Antipholus of Ephesus	Courtyard Theater	Chicago Shakespeare Theater	
2023	A Little Night Music	Count Carl-Magnus Malcolm	The Royal Conservatory of Music	Concert staging	
2024	Something Rotten!	Nostradamus	Festival Theatre	Stratford Festival	
2024	The Diviners	Brooke	Tom Patterson Theatre	Stratford Festival	
2024	The Wizard of Oz	Plumbum	Elgin Theatre	Canadian Stage Company	
2025	Fifteen Dogs	Benjy	CAA Theatre	Mirvish Productions	

== Filmography ==
=== Television ===
Year	Show	Role	Notes
1993	Class of '96	Kenny Dolan	S1.E13: "Greenwich Mean Time"
1996	F/X: The Series	Hero	S1.E4: "Payback"
1997–98	Diabolik	Leonov	Voice role
1998	An Avonlea Christmas	Wilfred Ainsley	TV movie
1998–99	Little Men	Theodore "Laurie" Laurence	Recurring role: 17 episodes
1999	The Wonderful World of Disney	Six Foot Can	S2.E22: "Dogmatic"
1999	The Avengers: United They Stand	Steve Rogers / Captain America	Voice role; S1.E6: "Command Decision"
2000	Earth: Final Conflict	Vorjak	3 episodes
2001	Club Land	Jimmy Hunter	TV movie
2002	Queer as Folk	Reverend Brad	S2.E16: "You Say It's Your Birthday! I Couldn't Care Less!"
2002	Rescue Heroes	Urv	Voice role; S3.E2: "Ultimate Ride / The Newest Rescue Hero"
2002–03	Maggie and the Ferocious Beast	Reggie	Voice role; S2.E6: "Guess Who's Coming to Visit", S3.E11: "Chicken Ladies"
2008–09	Dex Hamilton: Alien Entomologist	Syrrus	Voice role; 4 episodes
2010–12	Babar and the Adventures of Badou	Prospero	Voice role; 3 episodes
2013–15	Oh No! It's an Alien Invasion	Briian	Voice role; main cast
2013–15	The Day My Butt Went Psycho!	Additional voices	Voice role; 6 episodes
2014	Lucky Duck	Captain Chase	Voice role; TV movie
2015	Reign	Lord Lionel	2 episodes: S3.E1: "Three Queens, Two Tigers", S3.E2: "Betrothed"
2017–20	Hotel Transylvania: The Series	Aunt Lydia, Dr. Gillman	Voice role: Main role
2018	The Next Step	Jacquie's Dad	S6.E14: "Ty'd to You"
2019	Go Away, Unicorn!	Chef-Bot	Voice role; S1.E47: "Ready or Bot, Unicorn!"
2019–20	D.N. Ace	Various	Voice role; 6 episodes
2019–24	Agent Binky: Pets of the Universe	Sergeant Fluffy Vandermere	Main role
2019–21	Let's Go Luna!	Sam Hopper	Voice role; S1.E31: 4 episodes
2020	The Dog & Pony Show	Santa	Voice role; S1.E31: "A Very Fishy Christmas"
2022–25	Thomas & Friends: All Engines Go	Beresford	Voice role; S2.E8: "Hot Air Percy", S2.E25: "Bring it on Beresford", S3.E21: "Percy's Duck Dilemma" , S4.E19: "Did I Miss It?" , S4.E20: "No More Surprises"
2023	Work It Out Wombats!	Kit	Voice role; Recurring
2023	Saving Me	Mark Bramble	Voice role; S2.E8: "The Not So Fun Fundraiser", S2.E10: "The Vault"
2023	Mittens & Pants	Monsieur LaFleur, Mr. Pig, and various others	Voice role; 59 episodes
2023	Pinkalicious & Peterrific	Pantonio	Voice role; S5.E6: "Color of the Year/Toothy McManners"
2024	Open Season: Call of Nature	Howdy	Voice role; S1.E9: "Camp Times Two/Straight from the Horse's Mouth"
2024	Murdoch Mysteries	Anthony Winghed-Sheen	S17.E14: "The Smell of Alarm"
2026–present	Super Why's Comic Book Adventures	Mr. More, Ice Pop Pete, Cally Cow, Radio Announcer, Dog	Voice role; 12 episodes

=== Film ===
Year	Title	Role	Notes
2000	Ernest	Coach Classen	Short film
2001	Glitter	Gary	
2001	Invitation	Dan	
2002	Fancy Dancing	Mar Stoddart	
2011	Mulroney: The Opera	Anchorman	

=== Web series ===
Year	Title	Role	Notes
2020	Leer Estates	All characters	Also a co-writer and co-director
2023	Super Why's Comic Book Adventures	More Man	Voice role; 5 episodes

=== Video games ===
Year	Title	Role	Notes	Ref.
2021	Far Cry 6	Additional voices		

== Awards and nominations ==
Year	Award	Category	Nominated work	Result	Ref.
1995	Dora Awards	Outstanding Male Performance in a Musical	Into the Woods	Nominated	
1996	Dora Awards	Outstanding Male Performance in a Musical	Beauty and the Beast	Won	
2015	Dora Awards	Outstanding Male Performance in a Musical	The Wild Party	Nominated	
2015	Canadian Screen Awards	Best Performance in an Animated Program or Series	Oh No! It's an Alien Invasion	Nominated	
2017	Dora Awards	Outstanding Male Performance in a Musical	Matilda the Musical	Nominated	
2017	Toronto Theatre Critics Awards	Best Supporting Actor in a Musical	Matilda the Musical	Won	
2018	Dora Awards	Outstanding Male Performance in a Musical	Life After	Nominated	
2018	Canadian Screen Awards	Best Performance in an Animated Program or Series	Hotel Transylvania	Nominated	
2020	Canadian Screen Awards	Best Lead Performance - TV Movie	A Christmas Carol: The Family Musical with a Scrooge Loose	Nominated	
2021	ACTRA Toronto Awards	Outstanding Performance - Male Voice	Hotel Transylvania	Nominated	
2024	ACTRA Toronto Awards	Outstanding Performance – Gender Non-Conforming or Male Voice	Mittens & Pants	Nominated	
