= Infinite Joy =

- The Songs of William Finn
- Live Original Cast Recording
- Music: William Finn
- Lyrics: William Finn
- Premiere: September 2000: Joe's Pub at The Public Theater
- Productions: 2000 New York City concert 2008 New York City concert

Infinite Joy is a musical revue consisting of songs by Broadway composer William Finn. The songs are mostly material cut from Finn's earlier shows and material from works Finn was then working on. Several of the songs were included in the composer's song cycle Elegies.

== Productions ==
The revue was initially performed on various dates in September 2000 and December 2000 through 2001 at Joe's Pub, a nightclub within The Public Theater in New York City. Finn played the piano and sang several songs. Other performers included: Liz Callaway, Carolee Carmello, Lewis Cleale, Stephen DeRosa, Wanda Houston, Norm Lewis, Mary Testa, Farah Alvin, James Sasser, and Kristin Woodbury. The revue was performed again at Joe's Pub in November 2008, with performers Carolee Carmello, Mary Testa, Malcolm Gets, and Stephen DeRosa.

A live recording was made at the January 2001 performance and released on RCA Victor in May 2001. William Ruhlmann, reviewing the recording for Allmusic wrote: "Finn's songs often have an "inside baseball" quality to them, revolving around the gay, Jewish world of musical theater. But they are often so witty, moving, and accomplished that they become universal despite themselves."

On March 29, 2004, another concert of Finn's songs was performed at the Merkin Concert Hall as part of The Kaufman Center's annual Broadway Close Up series, titled More Infinite Joy: The Music of William Finn. Performers included Betty Buckley, Stephen DeRosa, Raúl Esparza, Jesse Tyler Ferguson and Janet Metz. The songs were from Finn's The 25th Annual Putnam County Spelling Bee, Elegies, Falsettos, and A New Brain.

A third installment, Even More Infinite Joy was presented by The Kaufman Center at Merkin Concert Hall on October 31, 2005, featuring Finn, and featured songs from his "Songs of Innocence and Experience".

== Musical numbers ==
- "Mister Make Me a Song"
- "How Marvin Eats His Breakfast"
- "The Music Still Plays On"
- "Republicans"
- "I'd Rather Be Sailing"
- "Hitchhiking Across America"
- "That's Enough For Me"
- "And They're Off"
- "Anytime"
- "Falsettos At the East Milford Community Center" (Finn & DeRosa's spoken intro)
- "The Baseball Game"
- "The Bitch and the Madonna" (Finn welcomes Mary Testa & Carolee Carmello)
- "All Fall Down"
- "When The Earth Stopped Turning"
- Tannis Root" (Bill & Mary discuss parenting)
- "Set Those Sails"
- "I Have Found"
- "Infinite Joy"
- "Stupid Things I Won't Do"
- "Infinite Joy (reprise)"
- "Bows"
