= Lucky Duck =

2014 film by Disney Junior

- Directed by: Donald Kim
- Story by: Michael G. Stern
- Starring: Christian Borle; Tom Cavanagh; Megan Hilty
- Music by: Frederik Wiedmann
- Production company: Nelvana
- Distributed by: Disney–ABC Domestic Television
- Release date: June 20, 2014
- Running time: 43 minutes
- Country: Canada
- Language: English

Lucky Duck is a Canadian animated television special produced by Nelvana for Disney Junior, which originally aired on June 20, 2014. It stars Christian Borle, Tom Cavanagh, and Megan Hilty. It is the first original telefilm produced by Disney Junior.

== Plot ==
Lucky, a small rubber duck, prepares to leave the toy factory where he was born to be shipped to the store, but he is thrown away from the toy factory due to his faulty whistle. Eager to leave the factory, he manages to return to a box of toys ready to board the cargo ship that will be traveling for 5 weeks. However, the toys mock him for having a faulty whistle, but lucky wishes to have a kid that can love him and take him as his own. As night falls, he attempts to find an inn to stay, but is rejected by the toys. As he takes shelter in the cargo ship's steamer, he encounters a timid toy turtle named Snap, and a toy hippo with mis- matched eyes named Flow that he befriends. They also wanted to find a kid that will love them.

Later, the ship's captain leaves, and the tub toys begin a party called the tub toy twist. However, a storm begins and begins rocking the ship about. Lucky is inadvertently thrown off the cargo ship during a storm, becoming separated from the others. The next day, the ship is in bad shape, as the toys in the boxes are scattered around. The group decides to find Lucky, including the shark toy, who finally recognized how much he meant to the rest of them. Lucky Awakens and decides to go find his friends and to find a place to live.

Lucky soon encounters a group of swordfish that tease him, But he is saved by Wilbur, a dimwitted, but warmhearted seagull, That offers to take him to find the ship. However, his wing is injured when they are pelted by stones by a group of kids, and while he has to rest to get his wing better, Lucky goes alone. After losing directions thanks to a crab eating the moss trail that led back to the ship, and making friends with a group of dolphins that help him go faster, he reunites with Snap and Flo, when Lucky is shortly swallowed by a whale. After Snap is encouraged by flow, he went to plug himself right into the whale's blow hole, freeing Lucky.

The group make it back to the ship with Wilbur, who finally has his wing healed, but they end up lost in a mist. Lucky begins to lose hope, but remembering a kid who went through the same thing, he managed to lead the group back to the ship. They tried to get the ship back to its regular height, but everyone struggles. Luckily, they get the courage and push it back up. However, a storm begins. As everyone does emergency evacuation, the dolphins appear and help. However, during the chaos, Lucky is separated From them once again, and washed away into a shallow place with shallow pools, where a group of sea reptiles mock him. Lucky, believing that they are true, gives up hope after everything he has been through and cries himself to sleep.

The next morning, the group of toys get help from a nearby ship with the help from Wilbur and lead them to Lucky, who is adopted by the kid. The rest of the tub toys are given to kids that love them, and Wilbur is invited to come and stay. During his narration about how he is happy that everything turned out great, Lucky says that dreams can really come true.

== Voice cast ==
- Christian Borle as Lucky
- Tom Cavanagh as Snap
- Megan Hilty as Flo
- Dan Chameroy as Captain Chase
- Gage Munroe as Danny Chase
- Milton Barnes as Shark Toy
- Linda Ballantyne as Reporter
- Rob Tinkler as Wingo
- Richard Binsley as Bob Bubbly
- Joseph Motiki as Male Dolphins
- Denise Oliver as Female Dolphin

== Reception ==
Common Sense Media rated the film 4 out of 5 stars. TV Guide found, "It's a different kind of toy story."

== Home media ==
The special was released on DVD in Australia and New Zealand by independent distributor Jigsaw Entertainment, who had licensed the title from Disney.
