= Lillias White =

American actress and singer

- Born: Brooklyn, New York, U.S.
- Occupations: Actress; singer
- Years active: 1981–present
- Children: 2
- Website: lilliaswhite.com

Lillias White is an American actress and singer. She is particularly known for her performances in Broadway musicals. In 1989 she won an Obie Award for her performance in the off-Broadway musical Romance in Hard Times. In 1997, she won the Tony Award for Best Featured Actress in a Musical and Drama Desk Award for Outstanding Featured Actress in a Musical for portraying Sonja in Cy Coleman's The Life. She was nominated for a Tony Award again in 2010 for her work as Funmilayo in Fela Kuti's Fela!.

White is also known for her roles as Calliope in the Disney film Hercules (1997), and its animated series of the same name; Evette in the film Pieces of April (2003); and as Fat Annie in the Netflix series The Get Down. She has also starred as Bloody Mary in Rodgers and Hammerstein's South Pacific on PBS's Great Performances with Reba McEntire, and in the PBS documentary In Performance at the White House. She is an active cabaret singer and has appeared in concert with the Boston Pops Orchestra, the Brooklyn Philharmonic, and at Carnegie Hall.

== Career ==
=== Theatre ===
White is a Brooklyn, New York native, who made her Broadway debut in Barnum in 1981. She understudied the role of Effie in the original 1981 production of Dreamgirls, and played the part in the 1987 revival, for which she won the Drama League Award for Best Actress in a Musical.

One of her first professional jobs was playing Dorothy in a national tour of The Wiz. White has also appeared on Broadway as Grizabella in Cats, Asaka in Once on This Island, Miss Jones in How to Succeed in Business Without Really Trying, and Matron "Mama" Morton in Chicago, as well as appearing in Carrie and Fela!. For her role in Cy Coleman's The Life, she won the Tony, Drama Desk, and Outer Critics Circle Awards for her portrayal of a world-weary, no-nonsense, streetwise hooker named Sonja. Off-Broadway White has performed in the Public Theater production of the William Finn musical Romance in Hard Times (1989), for which she won the Obie Award, Dinah Was (1998) at the Gramercy Theatre as singer Dinah Washington, and the Second Stage Theatre production of Regina Taylor's musical Crowns (2002), for which she and the cast won the AUDELCO Award, Outstanding Ensemble Performance. In 2014, White appeared Off-Broadway in the Primary Stages production of the play While I Yet Live by Billy Porter. In 2015, White starred with Scott Wakefield Off-Broadway in the York Theatre Company's World premiere of Alan Govenar's musical Texas in Paris.

White, André De Shields, Stefanie Powers, and Georgia Engel appeared in the new musical Gotta Dance, directed and choreographed by Jerry Mitchell, which began performances on December 13, 2015, at Chicago's Bank of America Theatre, and ran through January 17, 2016.

In August 2022, White was announced to be playing the role of Hermes in the Broadway musical Hadestown beginning on September 13, 2022. She was the first woman to play the role. Her final performance was on 17 March 2024. On October 22 of that same year, she returned to the role for a temporary engagement that's set to last until February 2025.

==== Controversy ====
During a performance of Hadestown on October 12, 2022, White twice reprimanded an audience member from the stage for recording the production. White was unaware that this audience member was not recording, and was in fact using a captioning device because she was disabled and needed it to understand the dialogue of the musical. The theatre and production issued official apologies, affirmed their future commitments to accessibility, and offered a complimentary ticket to the audience member to make up for the incident. White did not comment on the incident herself. The audience member took to social media to urge users to stop harassing White, as the actress's social media profiles had been deluged with ageist and racist insults in response to the incident.

=== Concerts and cabaret ===
White's concert performances to benefit the Actors' Fund of America include Dreamgirls in 2001, Funny Girl in 2002, and Hair in 2004. She performed in the concert version of South Pacific, which was broadcast by PBS Great Performances in 2006. She performed with the Brooklyn Philharmonic in a concert of works by Leonard Bernstein, Aaron Copland, and George and Ira Gershwin celebrating the orchestra's 50th anniversary in July 2003. She also has appeared in concert at Carnegie Hall, in March 2004, singing Harold Arlen songs with the New York Pops. White performed her one-woman show at the Kennedy Center's "Barbara Cook's Spotlight" in November 2007, singing songs by Cy Coleman. At the New York Public Library for the Performing Arts at Lincoln Center, she performed in a concert, Broadway's Future Songbook, in September 2014. She has toured with her one-woman cabaret show From Brooklyn to Broadway, which she first presented in March 2000 at Arci's Place in New York City. She performed the show in San Francisco in 2003 at the Plush Room. Lilias has also performed at the Purple Room in Palm Springs, California.

She is heard on the 1990 Madonna recording "Rescue Me".

=== Television and film ===
White's television appearances include a regular role on Sesame Street, Law & Order, Law & Order: Special Victims Unit, and NYPD Blue. Her screen credits include voiceover work in Disney's Hercules and Anastasia and appearances in How the Grinch Stole Christmas, Game 6, Pieces of April, and Then She Found Me.

== Personal life ==
White was raised Catholic. She has a son named Mwambu and daughter named Jamilah.

== Awards and nominations ==
Year	Award	Category	Work	Result	Ref.
1990	Obie Award	Performance	Romance in Hard Times	Won	
1997	Tony Award	Best Featured Actress in a Musical	The Life	Won	
1997	Drama Desk Award	Outstanding Featured Actress in a Musical	The Life	Won	
1997	Outer Critics Circle Award	Outstanding Featured Actress in a Musical	The Life	Won	
2009	Ovation Award	Lead Actress in a Musical	The Best is Yet to Come: The Music of Cy Coleman	Nominated	
2010	Tony Award	Best Featured Actress in a Musical	Fela!	Nominated	
2015	Lucille Lortel Award	Outstanding Lead Actress in a Musical	Texas in Paris	Nominated	
2015	Bistro Award	Outstanding Major Engagement		Honouree	

== Filmography ==
=== Film ===
Year	Title	Role	Notes
1988	Me and Him	Dancing Secretary	
1994	North	Operator	
1994	Bleeding Hearts	Neighbor Woman	
1997	Hercules	Calliope	Voice role
1997	Anastasia	Ensemble	Voice role
2000	How the Grinch Stole Christmas	Shopper	
2002	Interview with the Assassin	Nurse	
2003	Pieces of April	Evette	
2005	Game 6	Toyota Moseby	
2007	Then She Found Me	Sheila	
2015	Nasty Baby	Cecilia	
2018	Melinda	Madam Magda	
2018	The Chaperone	Singer	
2021	The Drummer	Roberta	

=== Television ===
Year	Title	Role	Notes
1990–1993	Sesame Street	Lillian	Recurring role
1998	Hercules	Calliope (voice)	Recurring role; 6 episodes
1999	Hercules: Zero to Hero	Calliope (voice)	Television film
2004	The Jury	Teresa Scott	Episode: "Lamentation on the Reservation "
2015	Gotham	Choir Member	Episode: "The Fearsome Dr. Crane"
2015	Person of Interest	Hon. R. Reginald	Episode: "Guilty"
2016–2017	The Get Down	Fat Annie	Recurring role; 9 episodes
2019–2022	Russian Doll	Dr. Zaveri	2 episodes
2021	Search Party	Wilma	Episode: "The Imposter"
2022	Mickey Mouse Funhouse	Calliope (voice)	Episode: "Daisy and the Muses"
2024	Grotesquerie	Glorious McKall	2 episodes

=== Stage ===
Year	Title	Role	Notes
1981	Barnum	Joice Heth (Replacement)	St. James Theatre, Broadway
1981	Dreamgirls	Effie Melody White (Replacement)	Imperial Theatre, Broadway
1982	Rock 'N Roll! The First 5,000 Years	Performer	St. James Theatre, Broadway
1987	Dreamgirls	Effie Melody White	Ambassador Theatre, Broadway
1988	Carrie	Miss Gardener (Standby)	Virginia Theatre, Broadway
1989	Golden Boy	performer	Coconut Grove Playhouse, regional
1989	Romance in Hard Times	Hennie	The Public Theater, Off-Broadway
1990	Once on This Island	Asaka (Replacement)	Booth Theatre, Broadway
1991	Cats	Grizabella (Replacement)	Winter Garden Theatre, Broadway
1995	How to Succeed in Business Without Really Trying	Miss Jones	Richard Rogers Theatre, Broadway
1997	The Life	Sonja	Ethel Barrymore Theatre, Broadway
1998	Dinah Was	Dinah Washington	Gramercy Theatre, Off-Broadway
2002	Crowns	Velma	McCarter Theatre, regional
2005	Purlie	Missy Judson	New York City Center, Off-Broadway
2006	Chicago	Matron 'Mama' Morton (Replacement)	Ambassador Theatre, Broadway
2007	Damn Yankees	Dory	Reprise!, regional
2008	The Princess and the Black-Eyed Pea	Queen Zanuba	San Diego Repertory Theatre, regional
2009	The Best Is Yet to Come: The Music of Cy Coleman	performer	Rubicon Theatre, regional
2010	Fela!	Funmilayo Anikulapo-Kuti	Eugene O'Neill Theatre, Broadway
2011	The Best Is Yet to Come: The Music of Cy Coleman	performer	59E59, Off-Broadway
2012	Love, Loss, and What I Wore	performer	Westside Theatre, Off-Broadway
2012	Gem of the Ocean	Aunt Ester	Rubicon Theatre, regional
2012	Big Maybelle: Soul of the Blues	Big Maybelle	Bay Street Theater, regional
2013	Joe Turner’s Come and Gone	Bertha	Mark Taper Forum, regional
2014	While I Yet Live	Gertrude	Primary Stages, Off-Broadway
2015	Texas in Paris	Osceola Mays	York Theatre, Off-Broadway
2015	Gotta Dance	Bea	Bank of America Theatre, regional
2016	Ma Rainey's Black Bottom	Ma Rainey	Mark Taper Forum, regional
2018	Half Time	Bea	Paper Mill Playhouse, regional
2021	Chicago	Matron 'Mama' Morton (Replacement)	Ambassador Theatre, Broadway
2022	Black No More	Madame Sisseretta	Signature Theatre Company, Off-Broadway
2023	Hadestown	Hermes (Replacement)	Walter Kerr Theatre, Broadway
2026	Mother. Daughter. Father. Son.	Edna	Adirondack Theatre Festival, regional

=== Video games ===
Year	Title	Role	Notes
1997	Disney's Animated Storybook: Hercules	Calliope	
1997	Hercules	Calliope	
