= Some Like It Hot (cast album) =

2023 cast recording by the Broadway cast of Some Like It Hot

Some Like It Hot (Original Broadway Cast Recording)

Cast recording by the Broadway cast of Some Like It Hot
- Released: March 10, 2023
- Recorded: January 22–24, 2023
- Genres: Musical theater; show tune
- Length: 1:09:52
- Label: Concord Theatricals
- Producers: Marc Shaiman; Scott Wittman

Some Like It Hot (Original Broadway Cast Recording) is the 2023 album performed by the cast members of the 2022 Broadway musical Some Like It Hot, based on the Metro-Goldwyn-Mayer and United Artists' 1959 film of the same name. Featuring musical performances from Christian Borle, J. Harrison Ghee, Adrianna Hicks, NaTasha Yvette Williams, Kevin Del Aguila and the ensemble cast, who performed the original songs composed by Marc Shaiman who co-wrote it with Scott Wittman, the album was released through Concord Theatricals on March 10, 2023. At the 66th Annual Grammy Awards, it won the Best Musical Theater Album.

== Background ==
On January 16, 2023, Concord announced the release of the cast album through its specialised label for cast recordings, Concord Theatricals, which was set for March 10, 2023. The performance was recorded during the Broadway show held for three days from January 22–24, 2023. The album consists of 17 songs from the musical, all except for the ensemble number of "Tip Tap Trouble".

== Track listing ==
No.	Title	Performer(s)	Length
1.	"What Are You Thirsty For?"	NaTasha Yvette Williams; Some Like It Hot Original Broadway Cast	5:08
2.	"You Can't Have Me (If You Don't Have Him)"	Christian Borle; J. Harrison Ghee	4:07
3.	"Vamp!"	Borle; Ghee	3:49
4.	"I'm California Bound"	Williams; Borle; Ghee; Adrianna Hicks; Cast	4:32
5.	"A Darker Shade of Blue"	Hicks	4:21
6.	"Take It Up A Step"	Hicks; Borle; Ghee; Cast	2:49
7.	"Zee Bap"	NWilliams; Ghee; Female Cast	2:52
8.	"At the Old Majestic Nickel Matinee"	Adrianna Hicks	4:26
9.	"Poor Little Millionaire"	Kevin Del Aguila; Cast	4:13
10.	"Some Like It Hot"	Williams; Hicks; Ghee; Cast	5:18
11.	"Let's Be Bad"	Del Aguila; Ghee; Cast	4:16
12.	"Let's Dance the World Away"	Borle; Hicks; Cast	4:26
13.	"Fly, Mariposa, Fly"	Del Aguila; Cast	3:19
14.	"You Could've Knocked Me Over With a Feather"	Ghee	3:53
15.	"He Lied When He Said Hello"	Borle; Cast	4:27
16.	"Ride Out the Storm"	Hicks	4:11
17.	"Baby, Let's Get Good"	Cast	3:45
Total length:			1:09:52

== Reception ==
Bobby Patrick of BroadwayWorld in his 5-star review, stated the album "captures and delivers the show to our ears, giving us song, story, and dance from start to finish". Frank Rizzo of Variety and Lester Fabian Brathwaite of Entertainment Weekly complimented the music as both "sizzling", "fun" and "witty". Jesse Green of The New York Times added that the music was "designed, like so many Golden Age musicals, to give pleasure both within and without the story". Alexis Soloski of The Guardian described the musical numbers as a "pastiche" of other songs from Shaiman and Wittman's works, and few numbers being misplaced.

== Release history ==
Release dates and formats for Some Like It Hot (Original Broadway Cast Recording)
Region	Date	Format(s)	Label	Ref.
Various	March 10, 2023	Digital download; streaming	Concord Theatricals	
Various	May 12, 2023	CD	Concord Theatricals	
Various	September 8, 2023	Vinyl	Concord Theatricals	

== Charts ==
=== Weekly charts ===
Chart (2023)	Peak position
UK Soundtrack Albums (OCC)	1
US Cast Albums (Billboard)	1

=== Year-end charts ===
Chart (2023)	Position
US Cast Albums (Billboard)	3

== Accolades ==
Ceremony	Date	Categories	Results	Ref.
Grammy Awards	February 4, 2024	Best Musical Theater Album	Won	
