= Keith Byron Kirk =

American actor, singer and playwright

- Occupations: Theater actor, singer and playwright

Keith Byron Kirk is an American theater actor, singer and playwright. He is a director of graduate studies for the Theatre Department at the Virginia Commonwealth University.

== Education ==
Kirk attended SUNY (Anderson Scholarship recipient) where he received his MA in Performance Studies and Playwriting at New York University in the spring of 2007 (Newington/Cropsey Foundation Fellow, Alfred Gallatin Scholarship 2006/07) and his PhD at Northwestern University’s Interdisciplinary Theatre and Drama Program under the guidance of Professors Tracy Davis and Harvey Young.

== Career ==
=== Early Career in Chicago ===
Kirk's career as a performer began in Chicago, Il in Steinbeck’s The Grapes of Wrath with Steppenwolf Theatre Co, alongside Gary Sinise, Kathryn Erbe, and Lois Smith. He followed the production to the La Jolla Playhouse, The Royal National Theatre in London, and eventually to Broadway in the production's Tony Award winning run at the Cort Theatre After the Broadway production closed, Kirk returned to Chicago and continued to work for Steppenwolf, as well as The Goodman Theatre, Wisdom Bridge, and Blind Parrot Theatre.

=== National Tours, Broadway, and Recordings ===
Kirk's career as a singer led him to the 1st National Tour of Cameron Macintosh's Miss Saigon in the role of John. He was awarded a Joseph Jefferson Award for his performance as Supporting Actor in a Musical. His success on the road led him to both the Los Angeles production and the Broadway production in the same role. His performance captured the attention of Sir Trevor Nunn, who invited Kirk to London to explore Nunn's adaptation of Gershwin’s Porgy and Bess. Hal Prince personally invited Kirk to play Che Guevara in Prince's final tour of Evita. Kirk later took on the roles of Grady and Mister in the Los Angeles and Chicago productions of The Color Purple, as well as the 1st National tour. Additional credits include A New Brain, Elegies, King David, The Civil War, and The Piano Lesson. Kirk can be heard on the original cast recordings of A New Brain and Elegies, both written by William Finn, as well as Georgia Stitt’s album This Ordinary Thursday. Kirk has been seen in concerts and productions across the country in venues like the Ahmanson Theatre, Lincoln Center, and the Kennedy Center for the Performing Arts.

=== Playwright ===
Kirk is the author of Ft. Lonesome, Urban Trilogy, As Reaper in Summer Grain, Knees of a Natural Man, and several One Act plays. His career as a playwright got started while he was working as an assistant to playwright, poet, and author Ntozake Shange. As a finalist in the Ensemble Studio Theatre’s Marathon of One Act Plays, the first of his Urban Trilogy plays was given a production in 2004. He was a finalist for the 2004 Theodore Ward Prize, and his play As Reaper in Summer Grain was workshopped at the Eugene O’Neill Playwright's Conference in 2005. More recently, some of his projects include the book for a new musical based on the Montgomery Bus Boycott, and The Transport Group's The Audience which was nominated for a Drama Desk Award in 2005. Kirk also worked with Frank Wildhorn to mine the original historic texts which became the African American narratives in the Broadway production of The Civil War. Ensemble Studio Theatre recently produced his one act play PARABLE which is based on the relationship singer Marvin Gaye had with his father.

== Research work ==
His research explores history and collective memory in African American funerary ritual, as well as civil dramaturgy and community engagement. From 2011 to 2016 he returned to Houston as assistant professor of performance studies and head of the MA program in dramaturgy and performance at the University of Houston and later served as assistant professor of Performance Studies and African American Drama in the University of Pittsburgh’s Department of Theatre Arts. Kirk joined the faculty at Virginia Commonwealth University in fall of 2017, where he continues to serve as director of graduate studies for the Theatre Department.
