= Worcester Foothills Theatre =

Coordinates: 42°15′45.52″N 71°47′57.87″W

- Interactive map of Worcester Foothills Theatre
- Address: 100 Front Street; Worcester, Massachusetts; United States
- Capacity: 349

Construction
- Opened: 1974
- Closed: 2009

Website
- www.foothillstheatre.com

The Worcester Foothills Theatre was a professional theater company and venue in Worcester, Massachusetts that performed a variety of plays, Musicals, and Musical Reviews.

== History ==
The Worcester Foothills Theatre, was founded in 1974 by Marc and Susan Smith. Foothills Theatre originally operated from a 200-seat theatre in downtown Worcester. When this building was sold in 1982, Foothills spent 5 years putting up productions in various spaces. In 1987, Foothills Theatre moved to its ultimate site in the former Worcester Center Galleria.

Foothills Theatre "suspended operations" on May 10, 2009, due to lack of funding.
