= Amour (musical) =

1997 musical by Michel Legrand & Didier Van Cauwelaert

- 2002 Broadway Playbill
- Music: Michel Legrand
- Lyrics: Jeremy Sams (English lyrics); Didier Van Cauwelaert (French lyrics)
- Book: Jeremy Sams (English book); Didier Van Cauwelaert (French book)
- Basis: Le Passe-Muraille by Marcel Aymé
- Productions: 1997 Paris; 2002 Broadway; 2019 Off-West End

Amour is a musical fantasy with an English book and lyrics by Jeremy Sams, music by Michel Legrand, and original French lyrics by Didier Van Cauwelaert, who also wrote the original French libretto.

The musical is adapted from the 1943 short story Le Passe-Muraille by Marcel Aymé and set in Paris shortly after World War II. It centers on a shy, unassuming clerk who develops the ability to walk through walls, and who challenges himself to stick to his moral center and change others' lives, and his own, as a result.

== Production ==
In 1997, Legrand, a noted film composer and jazz musician, and a newcomer to stage musicals at age 65, brought the musical (under its original title, Le Passe Muraille) to Paris where it won the Prix Molière for Best Musical.

The Broadway production, directed by James Lapine and presented without intermission, opened on October 20, 2002 at the Music Box Theatre. The show closed after 17 performances and 31 previews. The cast included Malcolm Gets and Melissa Errico.

The musical received mostly negative reviews in America, although Errico, Gets and the score were praised. Ben Brantley, in his review for The New York Times, wrote: "Even charming is too weighty a word to describe the wispy appeal of Amour" The Talkin' Broadway reviewer, however, wrote: "Broadway's Music Box Theatre may have found its most ideal tenant in quite a while. The delightful little jewel box of a musical, Amour, ...deserves a lengthy stay there, where it may enchant audiences for a long time to come." Cary Wong in filmscoremonthly wrote: "The lyrics are mostly pedestrian and uninvolving, and they make the already stock characters even more one-dimensional." He does note that "...while there is a lot to admire in this musical, it's too much of a chamber operetta to compete with the likes of 'Hairspray' and 'La Boheme'."

A "reconceived production" was produced by Goodspeed Musicals from August 11 through September 4, 2005, directed by Darko Tresnjak.

Amour made its European premiere in a new production presented by Danielle Tarento at the Charing Cross Theatre from May 2 to June 8, 2019, with direction from Hannah Chissick, choreography by Matt Cole, musical direction by Jordan Li-Smith and designed by Adrian Gee. The production starred Gary Tushaw as Dusoleil, Anna O'Byrne as Isabelle and Alasdair Harvey as the Prosecutor, alongside Elissa Churchill, Claire Machin, Keith Ramsay, Jack Reitman, Steven Serlin and Alistair So, with understudy Laura Barnard. Amour was nominated for 8 Offies, and received the 2020 Offie for 'Best Costume Design' and 'Best New Musical'.

== Characters ==
- Dusoleil: a self-proclaimed "ordinary guy" who discovers he can walk through walls
- Isabelle: an unhappily married woman and the object of Dusoleil's affections
- Whore, Painter, Newsvendor: three street workers who support Dusoleil
- Prosecutor: Isabelle's husband, a man with more than a few skeletons in his closet
- Boss: Dusoleil's nasty boss
- Doctor Roucefort: Dusoleil's doctor, who gives him the eventual cure to his intangibility
- Madeleine, Claire, Charles, Bertrand: Dusoleil's co-workers. The women reveal feelings for Dusoleil when they discover he is the elusive "Monsieur Passepartout"
- Policemen: "henchmen" hired by the prosecutor to keep the people of Montmartre in check
- Monsieur le President: President of the tribunal that tries Dusoleil
- Advocate: Dusoleil's lawyer, who appears on behalf of Dusoleil on his very first day in court

== Plot ==
In Paris after World War II, a shy, unassuming "invisible" civil servant, Dusoleil, lives alone and works in a dreary office under a tyrannical boss. His lazy co-workers are unhappy because Dusoleil is a hard worker who finishes his work early. To pass the time, he writes letters to his mother and daydreams about the beautiful Isabelle. Isabelle is kept locked away by her controlling husband, the prosecutor-general with an unsavory past. When Dusoleil miraculously gains the ability to walk through walls, he begins to steal from the rich and give to the poor. He also gains the self-confidence to woo Isabelle, who is intrigued by the news stories about Passepartout, a mysterious criminal who can walk through walls.

Dusoleil's life, as well as Isabelle's and the other characters, takes a rich and, for a while, romantic turn. As Dusoleil admits to being Passepartout, he is put on trial in front of the prosecutor. Before the trial progresses, Isabelle reveals her husband's secret—that he was a Nazi collaborator. Dusoleil is pardoned and he spends one romantic night with Isabelle. When he takes pills that the doctor has given him, mistaking them for aspirin, he loses his magic power. He becomes stuck mid-leap in a wall, and his memory is carried on in story and song.

== Song list ==
Act One

- 1. "Opening" – Company
- 2. "Office Life" – Dusoleil, Madeleine, Claire, Bertrand and Charles
- 2a. “Office Life Playoff (Optional Number)” — Madeleine, Claire, Bertrand and Charles
- 3. "Dusoleil Leaves The Office" – Dusoleil
- 4. "Other People's Stories" – Isabelle and Dusoleil
- 5. "Street Vendors' Waltz" – Whore, Painter and Newsvendor
- 6. “Taking Rent/Combo” — Policemen, Prosecutor, Whore, Painter, Newsvendor, Isabelle and Dusoleil
- 6a. “Rent Playoff (Optional Number)”
- 7. "Dusoleil Walks Through the Wall" – Dusoleil
- 8. “Dusoleil Is Puzzled” — Dusoleil
- 9. "The Doctor’s Song" – Doctor
- 10. “The Doctor’s Diagnosis" – Doctor and Dusoleil
- 11. "An Ordinary Guy" – Dusoleil
- 12. “Extra, Extra!” — Newsvendor
- 13. "The New Boss Arrives" – Madeleine, Claire, Bertrand and Charles
- 14. "Your Brand New Boss" – Boss, Dusoleil, Madeleine, Claire, Bertrand and Charles
- 15. “Dusoleil Insulted” Boss and Dusoleil
- 16. "Revenge" – Boss, Dusoleil, Madeleine, Claire, Bertrand and Charles
- 17. “Bread Song” — Dusoleil, Isabelle and Prosecutor
- 18. “The Two Policemen” — Policemen
- 19. "Somebody" – Isabelle
- 20. "Prosecutor's Song" – Prosecutor
- 21. "The Whore's Lament" – Whore and Dusoleil
- 22. “Extra, Extra! Reprise” — Newsvendor
- 23. "Monsieur Passepartout" – Dusoleil, Newsvendor, Painter, Whore, Madeleine, Charles and Policemen
- 24. “Quartet” — Madeline, Whore, Newsvendor, Painter, Prosecutor, Policemen and Isabelle
- 25. "Isabelle’s Song (Special Time of Day)" – Isabelle
- 26. “Dusoleil In Love” — Isabelle and Dusoleil
- 27. “Forget It — Act One Finale (Waiting) — Painter, Dusoleil, Policemen, Newsvendor and Bystanders

Act Two

- 28. "Java Of The Latest News" – Newsvendor, Whore and Painter
- 28a. “Prison Director’s Song (Optional Number)” — Prison Governor
- 28b. “The Two Prison Guards (Optional Number)” — Prison Guards
- 29. "Dusoleil in Jail" – Dusoleil
- 30. “Madeleine And Claire In Love” — Madeleine and Claire
- 31. “News Vendor On The Radio” - Newsvendor
- 32. “Dusoleil On The Run” — Dusoleil
- 33. “Dusoleil Talks To The Painter” — Dusoleil and Painter
- 34. "Street Painter's Song" – Painter
- 35. "Isabelle On Her Balcony" – Isabelle, Dusoleil and Prosecutor
- 36. "Transformation" – Madeline and Company
- 37. "The Lawyer’s Plea" – Monsieur le President and Lawyer
- 38. "Trio For Witnesses" – Monsieur le President, Nun, Whore, Communist and Prosecutor
- 39. “Summing Up” — Prosecutor, Monsieur le President, Chorus, Isabelle and Dusoleil
- 40. “Dusoleil Fights Back” — Dusoleil, Isabelle, Prosecutor, Monsieur le President and Chorus
- 41. "Duet For Dusoleil And Isabelle" – Dusoleil, Isabelle and Chorus
- "Whistling Ballet" – Dusoleil, Lawyer, Whore, Monsieur le President, Communist and Nun
- 43. "Amour" – Isabelle and Dusoleil
- 44. "Love’s Hangover" – Dusoleil, Newsvendor, Doctor and Company
- 45. "Serenade" – Dusoleil and Isabelle
- 46. “Dusoleil’s Postlude” — Dusoleil, Isabelle and Company

== Recording ==
A recording of the musical was released by Ghostlight on July 8, 2003.

This recorded album features an abridged song list.

- "Overture" – Company
- "Office Life" – Dusoleil, Madeleine, Claire, Bertrand and Charles
- "Going Home Alone" – Dusoleil
- "Other People's Stories" – Isabelle and Dusoleil
- "Street Vendors' Waltz" – Whore, Painter, Newsvendor, Policemen, Prosecutor, Isabelle and Dusoleil
- "Dusoleil Walks Through the Wall" – Dusoleil
- "The Doctor" – Doctor and Dusoleil
- "Ordinary Guy" – Dusoleil
- "Dusoleil's Revenge" – Boss, Dusoleil, Madeleine, Claire, Bertrand and Charles
- "Somebody" – Isabelle
- "Prosecutor's Song" – Prosecutor
- "Whore's Lament" – Whore and Dusoleil
- "Monsieur Passepartout" – Newsvendor, Painter, Whore, Madeleine and Policemen
- "Special Time of Day" – Isabelle and Dusoleil
- "Waiting" – Dusoleil
- "Latest News" – Newsvendor, Whore and Painter
- "Dusoleil in Jail" – Dusoleil, Madeleine and Claire
- "Painter's Song" – Painter
- "Isabelle on Her Balcony" – Isabelle, Dusoleil and Prosecutor
- "Transformation" – Company
- "The Advocate's Plea" – Advocate
- "The Trial" – Monsieur le President, Madeleine, Whore, Painter, Prosecutor, Dusoleil and Isabelle
- "Duet for Dusoleil and Isabelle" – Dusoleil and Isabelle
- "Whistling Ballet" – Dusoleil, Painter, Whore, Newsvendor, Madeleine and Policemen
- "Amour" – Isabelle and Dusoleil
- "Dusoleil Meets the Press" – Dusoleil, Newsvendor, Doctor and Company
- "Serenade" – Dusoleil, Isabelle and Company

== Honors and awards ==
=== Original Broadway production ===
Year	Award Ceremony	Category	Nominee	Result
2003	Tony Award	Best Musical		Nominated
2003	Tony Award	Best Book of a Musical	Jeremy Sams and Didier Van Cauwelaert	Nominated
2003	Tony Award	Best Original Score	Michel Legrand, Jeremy Sams and Didier Van Cauwelaert	Nominated
2003	Tony Award	Best Performance by a Leading Actor in a Musical	Malcolm Gets	Nominated
2003	Tony Award	Best Performance by a Leading Actress in a Musical	Melissa Errico	Nominated
2003	Drama Desk Award	Outstanding Musical		Nominated
2003	Drama Desk Award	Outstanding Book of a Musical	Jeremy Sams	Nominated
2003	Drama Desk Award	Outstanding Actor in a Musical	Malcolm Gets	Nominated
2003	Drama Desk Award	Outstanding Featured Actor in a Musical	Christopher Fitzgerald	Nominated
2003	Drama Desk Award	Outstanding Director of a Musical	James Lapine	Nominated
2003	Drama Desk Award	Outstanding Orchestrations	Michel Legrand	Nominated
2003	Drama Desk Award	Outstanding Lyrics	Didier Van Cauwelaert	Nominated
2003	Drama Desk Award	Outstanding Music	Michel Legrand	Nominated
2003	Drama Desk Award	Outstanding Set Design	Scott Pask	Nominated
