= Romance in Hard Times =

- Playbill of Romance in Hard Times
- Music: William Finn
- Lyrics: William Finn
- Book: William Finn
- Productions: 1989 Off-Broadway; 2014 Barrington Stage Company

Romance in Hard Times is a musical by William Finn. It ran briefly Off-Broadway in 1989 at the Public Theater.

== Productions ==
An earlier version of the show, America Kicks Up Its Heels, a vaudeville musical about Jews during the Great Depression, received two staged readings from Playwrights Horizons, along with a fully staged production running from March 3, 1983 to March 27, 1983. Directed by Mary Kyte and Ben Levit, and choreographed by Kyte, the cast featured Alix Korey, Dick Latessa, and Robert Dorfman. The musical was subsequently re-imagined with African-American characters, and re-named.

Romance in Hard Times was part of the 1989 and 1990 Public Theater New York Shakespeare Festival in New York City. Romance in Hard Times was presented in one of Joseph Papp's "musical laboratories" at the Public Theater's Anspacher Theater for three weeks in June 1989. Directed by David Warren, the cast featured Lillias White. It was open to the public but not for critics.

The musical then opened Off-Broadway at The Public Theater on November 14, 1989 and closed on December 17, 1989. The musical was again directed by David Warren with musical direction by Ted Sperling and choreography by Marcia Milgrom Dodge. The cast featured Lillias White (as Hennie), Cleavant Derricks (as Boris), Peggy Hewett (as Eleanor Roosevelt), Victor Trent Cook (as The Kid), Rufus Bonds, Jr., James Stovall, Lawrence Clayton (as Harvey), and Alix Korey (as Zoe). White won the Obie Award, Performance, in 1990.

The musical ran at Finn's Barrington Stage Company's Musical Theatre Lab from August 14, 2014 to August 31, 2014, with a new book by Finn's The 25th Annual Putnam County Spelling Bee collaborator Rachel Sheinkin. The show was directed by Joe Calarco. The cast featured David Benoit, Lance Fletke, Alan H. Green, Demond Green, Anne Kanengeiser, Theresa Kloos, Alix Korey, Andrea Leach, Michael Mandell, Christina Acosta Robinson, and Aaron Serotsky.

== Plot summary ==
The musical takes place in a soup kitchen in New York City during the Depression. Hennie, a pregnant woman who works in the soup kitchen, decides not to give birth until children have a better world. Eleanor Roosevelt provides messages of hope.
