= A New Brain =

Musical

- CD Cover of the Original Cast Recording
- Music: William Finn
- Lyrics: William Finn
- Book: William Finn; James Lapine
- Basis: The life of William Finn
- Productions: 1998 Off-Broadway; 2002 St. Louis; 2015 Encores! Off-Center
- Awards: 1999 Outer Critics Circle Award for Outstanding New Off-Broadway Musical

A New Brain is a musical with music and lyrics by William Finn and book by Finn and James Lapine. Though many of Finn's previous musicals are to some extent autobiographical, A New Brain deals directly with his own harrowing experience with an arteriovenous malformation and the healing power of art. The protagonist of the musical, Gordon Schwinn, worries that he may not live to complete his work. Finn wrote many of the songs soon after his release from the hospital. The musical premiered Off-Broadway in 1998 and has been revived in the U.S., England and elsewhere.

== Productions ==
A New Brain started as a "series of songs that Bill Finn wrote after he left the hospital", with a concert of those songs produced at The Public Theater. A fully staged workshop production was held in 1996, followed by a smaller workshop in 1997, both incorporating contributions by Lapine.

The musical was first produced Off-Broadway at the Mitzi E. Newhouse Theater at Lincoln Center, with previews beginning May 14, 1998, an official opening on June 18, and a closing on October 11, 1998. The production was directed by Graciela Daniele, with orchestrations by Michael Starobin, music direction and additional vocal arrangements by Ted Sperling, and vocal arrangements by Jason Robert Brown, and featured a cast headed by Malcolm Gets (Gordon Michael Schwinn) and Christopher Innvar (Roger Delli-Bovi), including Michael Mandell (Richard), Penny Fuller (Mimi Schwinn), Mary Testa (Lisa), Kristin Chenoweth (Waitress/Nancy D), Chip Zien (Mr. Bungee), Liz Larsen (Rhoda), John Jellison (Doctor), and Keith Byron Kirk (Minister). Lovette George was an understudy for Rhoda, Waitress, and Nancy D. Gets left the production on August 2, 1998, and was succeeded as Gordon by Lewis Cleale beginning August 4. Christopher Innvar also left the show in June 1998 due to vocal problems, and was succeeded by Norm Lewis.

A New Brain was next performed at Rice University during the Sid Richardson Players' 1999–2000 season. It was also done at UC Berkeley BareStage during the 2000–2001 season, which transferred to Shotgun Players in 2001. A 2001 production followed at Washington, D.C.'s Studio Theatre, directed by Serge Seiden, with Michael Rupert, who had originated the role of Marvin in March of the Falsettos two decades earlier, now playing Gordon. The show was also produced in March 2002 in St. Louis, Missouri, at New Line Theatre, then premiered in the UK at the Edinburgh Fringe Festival in 2005, with the English premiere in September 2006 in Littlehampton, West Sussex.

The musical was presented as part of the Encores! Off-Center staged concert series June 24–27, 2015 at the New York City Center. The production included multiple rewrites by Finn and Lapine and was directed by Lapine. It starred Jonathan Groff as Gordon and featured Dan Fogler as Mr. Bungee, Ana Gasteyer as Mimi, and Aaron Lazar as Roger.

A 2023 production at Barrington Stage Company, presented in association with the Williamstown Theatre Festival and directed by Joe Calarco, featured Mary Testa as Mimi.

== Plot ==
Lisa, a homeless woman, asks the audience for change. Songwriter Gordon Schwinn works at his piano to meet a deadline for a children's television show, hosted by Mr. Bungee, whom he resents ("Prologue: Frogs Have So Much Spring (The Spring Song)"). Gordon takes a break from writing The Spring Song to meet his best friend Rhoda at a restaurant, who encourages him to keep working on the song. The waitress at the restaurant overhears them talking, and tells the pair about her love for the Mr. Bungee T.V. show and the specials at the restaurant. ("Specials"). During lunch, Gordon falls unconscious unexpectedly. Rhoda calls him an ambulance ("911 Emergency"), and Gordon is taken to the hospital. Gordon's greatest fear is dying with his greatest songs still inside him ("I Have so Many Songs"), to which he ponders about what makes a song ("Heart and Music"). Gordon's mother, Mimi, tries to reassure Gordon and herself that everything will be alright ("Mother's Gonna Make Things Fine"). Shortly after, a neurosurgeon, Dr. Jafar Berensteiner, explains that an MRI is necessary to find out what is afflicting Gordon ("Trouble in His Brain").

Gordon snaps at Mimi for underestimating his condition and not listening to the Doctor, to which a hallucination of Mr. Bungee appears to lecture Gordon about being rude ("Be Polite to Everybody"). Gordon awaits his boyfriend, Roger Delli-Bovi, who sings a song about his love for sailing ("Sailing"). The nurses, Nancy D., "the thin nurse", and Richard, "the nice nurse" appear to request a family history from Gordon, to which he states that he has only inherited the worst traits of his parents ("Gordo's Law of Genetics"). Thinking of his parents, Gordon sings about his father's horse betting addiction and his parents' eventual divorce ("And They're Off"). Rhoda announces that Roger is finally back from his sailing trip ("Roger Arrives"), and Roger and Gordon spend time together, though Gordon tells him to leave due to his own weak condition ("Just Go"). Richard enters to give Gordon a sponge bath in preparation for his MRI ("MRI Tomorrow"). During the sponge bath, Richard complains about being unsuccessful, causing Gordon to hallucinate a Mr. Bungee, who berates him. ("Poor, Unsuccessful, and Fat"). Gordon is visited by a minister, who tries to impose his Protestant beliefs on Gordon, who is Jewish. Gordon asks him to leave, and goes to sleep.

Gordon is woken by Nancy, who tells him that it's time for his MRI ("MRI Day"). To cope with his claustrophobia, he imagines that he is on a sailing trip with Roger ("Sitting Becalmed in the Lee of Cuttyhunk"). Dr. Berensteiner tells Gordon that he has an arteriovenous malformation, and that Gordon needs a craniotomy ("Craniotomy"). Nancy D. informs him of the risks - if he doesn't go through with the operation, he could die, however, if Dr. Berensteiner is not exact with his surgery, he could also die. Gordon, given the choice by the Doctor, decides to go through with the operation, and Roger offers to sleep with Gordon that night. Rhoda arrives with news that Mr. Bungee needs a new song by the next morning, so Gordon declines Roger's offer and decides to write instead, as it may be the last song he ever writes ("An Invitation to Sleep In My Arms"). He then hallucinates about Lisa, who he encountered earlier on his way to lunch with Rhoda. Lisa implores the audience for both social change and change in the form of money ("Change"). Gordon sends his new song, to Mr. Bungee, who hates it, storming off to have his son write the song ("Yes"). Gordon, dejected, argues with his mother, as she still insists to him that everything will be perfectly fine ("In the Middle of the Room"). Mimi cleans Gordon's apartment, and in a rage, throws out all of his books ("Throw It Out"). Gordon waits anxiously as his surgery is delayed ("In the Middle of the Room (Reprise)") before the operation starts.

Roger, distraught about the surgery, encounters Lisa, who consoles him ("A Really Lousy Day in the Universe"). In a coma, Gordon hallucinates a surreal mini-opera featuring people from his life ("Brain Dead", "Whenever I Dream", "Eating Myself Up Alive", "The Music Still Plays On"), concluding with a friendly Mr. Bungee telling Gordon to wake up ("Don't Give In"), leading him back to consciousness. Dr. Berensteiner celebrates the successful surgery ("Craniotomy (Reprise)"). Gordon and Roger fool around in the hospital shower, with the permission of Richard ("You Boys Are Gonna Get Me In Such Trouble!"). Content, Gordon expresses his new appreciation for life ("Sailing (Reprise)").

Months later, Gordon has recovered and is enjoying a new, more fulfilled life with Roger. They run into Lisa, who is selling Gordon's books that Mimi threw out. Gordon and Roger ask for them back, but she refuses ("On the Street (The Homeless Lady's Revenge)"). She flees with the books, leaving Gordon upset, but Roger calms him, telling him that they're "just books" ("Time"). Gordon has apparently overcome his fear of dying with his greatest songs inside him ("Time and Music"). With his life at last in balance, he is able to write again and finishes the spring song ("I Feel so Much Spring").

== Character list and notable casts ==
Character	Off-Broadway	Encores! Off-Center
Character	1998	2015
Gordon Michael Schwinn	Malcolm Gets	Jonathan Groff
Mr. Bungee	Chip Zien	Dan Fogler
Mimi Schwinn	Penny Fuller	Ana Gasteyer
Rhoda	Liz Larsen	Alyse Alan Louis
Roger Delli-Bovi	Christopher Innvar	Aaron Lazar
Richard	Michael Mandell	Josh Lamon
Lisa	Mary Testa	Rema Webb
Waitress/Nancy D.	Kristin Chenoweth	Jenni Barber
Dr. Jafar Berensteiner	John Jellison	Bradley Dean
The Minister	Keith Byron Kirk	Quentin Earl Darrington

== Musical numbers ==
- "Prologue: Frogs Have So Much Spring (The Spring Song)" – Gordon
- "Specials" – Gordon, Rhoda, Waitress, Mr. Bungee (Note: Originally titled "Calamari".) (Note: Not included in the 2015 City Center revival.)
- "911 Emergency" / "I Have So Many Songs" – Richard, Doctor, Rhoda, Minister, Gordon with Lisa, Waitress
- "Heart and Music" – Minister, Gordon with All but Mr. Bungee
- "Trouble in His Brain" – Doctor, Mimi, Rhoda
- "Mother's Gonna Make Things Fine" – Mimi, Gordon
- "Be Polite to Everybody" – Mr. Bungee (Note: Not included in the original cast recording.)
- "Sailing" – Roger, Gordon
- "Family History" – Nancy D, Richard, Mimi
- "Gordo's Law of Genetics" – Nancy D, Doctor, Minister, Rhoda, Richard, Lisa
- "And They're Off" – Gordon with Nancy D, Doctor, Minister, Rhoda, Richard, Lisa
- "Roger Arrives" – Gordon, Roger, Mother, Rhoda
- "Just Go" – Gordon, Roger
- "Intro to Poor, Unsuccessful and Fat" – Gordon, Roger, Richard (Note: Titled "MRI Tomorrow" on the 2015 cast recording.)
- "Poor, Unsuccessful and Fat" – Richard, Gordon, Mr. Bungee, Minister
- "M.R.I. Day" – Gordon, Nancy D
- "Sitting Becalmed in the Lee of Cuttyhunk" – All but Mr. Bungee
- "Craniotomy" – Doctor, Nancy D, Minister, Mimi, Roger, Gordon
- "An Invitation to Sleep in My Arms" – Gordon, Roger, Rhoda, Mimi
- "Change" – Lisa
- "Yes" – Gordon, Mr. Bungee with Nancy D, Doctor, Minister, Rhoda
- "In the Middle of the Room" – Gordon, Mimi
- "Throw It Out" – Mimi
- "In the Middle of the Room (Reprise)" – Gordon
- "A Really Lousy Day in the Universe" – Roger, Lisa
- "Brain Dead" – Gordon, Roger
- "Whenever I Dream" – Rhoda, Gordon
- "Eating Myself Up Alive" – Richard with Nancy D, Doctor, Minister, Lisa
- "The Music Still Plays On" – Mimi
- "Don't Give In" – Mr. Bungee with Gordon, Roger, Rhoda, Mimi
- "Craniotomy (Reprise)" – Doctor (Note: This song is not included in the licensing for amateur productions.)
- "You Boys Are Gonna Get Me in Such Trouble!" / "Sailing (Reprise)" – Richard, Gordon, Roger
- "On the Street (Homeless Lady's Revenge)" – Lisa, Gordon, Roger
- "Time" – Roger and Gordon
- "Time and Music" – Minister, Gordon with All
- "I Feel So Much Spring" – Gordon, Lisa, Minister with All

== Recordings ==
An original cast recording of the 1998 production was released on the RCA Victor label, with Norm Lewis singing the role of Roger in place of Christopher Innvar, who had originated the role onstage. Reviewing the recording for Cast Album Reviews, David Barbour praised it as an unusually moving and original entry in Finn's catalog, singling out "And They're Off," "The Homeless Lady's Revenge," "The Music Still Plays On," and "I Feel So Much Spring" as highlights, and calling Lewis's rendition of "Sailing" a highlight of the album.

A new, updated cast recording was made by the cast of the 2015 Encores! Off-Center production (with the exception of Fogler, who was filming a movie in London at the time of the recording and was replaced by Christian Borle as Mr. Bungee) and was released February 5, 2016, by PS Classics. Unlike the original recording, this two-disc set contains the full show, including over 15 minutes of previously unrecorded music. Barbour reviewed this recording considerably less favorably, finding the performances technically skilled but emotionally distant and judging most of the show's new material inessential; he considered Groff's performance too placid for the role and Borle a weak substitute for Chip Zien's Mr. Bungee, though he praised Josh Lamon's turn as Richard and noted that Aaron Lazar's real-life diagnosis with ALS lent an unexpectedly poignant resonance to his performance as Roger.

== Critical reception ==
Ben Brantley, in his review for The New York Times, wrote: "The problem is that for Mr. Finn (and probably, alas, for most people), happiness is definitely a blander muse than anxiety. A New Brain, which has been directed with wit and elegance by Graciela Daniele, has moments of captivating eccentricity. But watching it is often like passing a group of animated, slightly drunken revelers on the street: you're glad they have something to celebrate, but it's a private party, and you walk on by with a faint smile. Mr. Finn originally conceived what became A New Brain as a series of revue numbers, and it might have worked better in that format. As a story, shaped by Mr. Finn and his longtime collaborator, James Lapine, the show has a spliced-together feeling, a disjunctive quality at odds with the holistic spirit it seems to be aiming for."

It won the 1999 Outer Critics Circle Award for Outstanding New Off-Broadway Musical and received two 1999 Drama Desk Award nominations, for Outstanding New Musical and Outstanding Music.
