= Malcolm Gets =

American actor (born 1963)

- Born: December 28, 1963 (age 62); Waukegan, Illinois, U.S.
- Education: University of Florida (BFA); Yale University (MFA)
- Occupation: Actor
- Years active: 1983–present

Malcolm Gets (born December 28, 1963) is an American actor. He is best known for his role as Richard in the American television sitcom Caroline in the City. Gets is also a dancer, singer, composer, classically trained pianist, vocal director, and choreographer. His first solo album came out in 2009 from PS Classics.

Gets was nominated for a Tony Award in 2003 (Best Performance by a Lead Actor in a Musical for Amour) and was awarded the Obie Award in 1995.

== Life and career ==
Gets was born in Waukegan, Illinois, the son of Lispbeth, an educator, and Terence Gets, a college textbook salesman. Both parents grew up in London, England. He moved with his family to New Jersey. He lived there until he was six, when his family moved to Gainesville, Florida. He has an older brother Erik, an older sister Alison and a younger sister Adrienne.

Gets started studying performing arts early in life. He began studying piano at age nine. This skill helped him pay his way through college. He began singing lessons at 14. He also danced with a studio in Gainesville as a teenager.

Gets skipped two years of K-12 education and graduated from Buchholz High School in Gainesville, Florida, aged 16. He then attended the University of Florida, where he won Best Newcomer's Award in acting and at age 24 earned a BFA in Theatre (1988). Following that, he completed an MFA at the Yale Drama School.

Gets came out as gay in the late 1990s and lives with his partner.

== Filmography ==
=== Television ===
Year	Title	Role	Notes
1993	Law & Order	Lance Keys	
1995–1999	Caroline in the City	Richard Karinsky	
1997	Sparkle Lounge	Host	On VH-1
1997	Remember WENN	Carter Dunlap	
2012	The Good Wife	Dale Lamborn	
2012	Blue Bloods	Prof. Brian Devlin	
2019	Tales of the City	Dinner party guest	

=== Film ===
Year	Title	Role	Notes
1984	A Flash of Green	Jigger Loesser	
1994	Mrs. Parker and the Vicious Circle	F. Scott Fitzgerald	
2001	Thirteen Conversations About One Thing	The Architect	
2002	Love in the Time of Money	Robert Walker	
2005	Adam & Steve	Steve	
2005	Little Boy Blues	Michael	
2008	Sex and the City	Building Agent	
2009	Grey Gardens	George "Gould" Strong	

== Theater ==
Year	Production	Role	Location	Category
1995	The Molière Comedies	Valère	Criterion Center Stage Right	Broadway
2002	Amour	Dusoleil	Music Box Theatre	Broadway
2009	The Story of My Life	Alvin Kelby	Booth Theatre	Broadway
2013-2014	Macbeth	Witch, Angus	Vivian Beaumont Theatre	Broadway

Gets was nominated for a Tony Award for Best Performance by a Leading Actor in a Musical in 2003 for his work in Amour.

Selected work

- Amadeus (1983)
- Cloud Nine (1984)
- Little Shop of Horrors as Seymour (1986)
- As Is (1987)

=== Special Events ===
- Dreamgirls as Film Executive (2001)
- Passion as Colonel Ricci (2004)

=== Off-Broadway ===
- Juno as Johnny Boyle (1992 at Vineyard Theatre)
- Hello Again as The Writer (1994 at Lincoln Center)
- Merrily We Roll Along as Franklin Shepard (1994 at the York Theatre)
- The Two Gentlemen of Verona as Proteus (1994 at Delacorte Theatre)
- A New Brain as Gordon Michael Schwinn (1998 at Lincoln Center)
- Boys and Girls as Jake (2002 at The Duke, 42nd Street)
- Polish Joke as Jasiu Sadlowski (2003 at Manhattan Theatre Club)
- Finian's Rainbow as Og (2004 at Irish Repertory Theatre)
- Vigil by [Morris Panych] as Kemp (2009 at the DR2 Theatre)
- Banished Children of Eve as Stephen Collins Foster (2010 at the Irish Repertory Theatre)
- Allegro as Joseph Taylor Sr. (2014 at Classic Stage Company)
- Steve as Stephen (2015 at Pershing Square Signature Center)

Gets was awarded the Obie Award for his work in Merrily We Roll Along and The Two Gentlemen of Verona in 1995.

=== Other appearances ===
- The Colorado Catechism by Vincent J. Cardinal as TY (1990 premiere at Yale School of Drama)
- The Boys from Syracuse Music by Richard Rodgers. Lyrics by Lorenz Hart. New Book by Nicky Silver. Based on the Original Book by George Abbott. as Antipholus of Ephesus (1997 at City Center)
- Edward II by Christopher Marlowe (2000 at American Conservatory Theater in San Francisco, California)
- Finian's Rainbow with music by Burton Lane and lyrics by EY Harburg as Og
  - 1997 at Freud Playhouse on the campus of UCLA
  - 2004 Irish Repertory Theatre
  - 2005 at Westport Country Playhouse in Connecticut
- Camelot at the Hollywood Bowl as Mordred (2005)
- Party Come Here at Williamstown Theatre Festival as Orlando (2007)
- "Lisbon Traviata" at The Kennedy Center (2010)

== Awards and nominations ==
Year	Award ceremony	Category	Show	Result
1995	Obie Award	Performance	The Two Gentlemen of Verona and Merrily We Roll Along	Won
1995	Drama Desk Award	Outstanding Actor in a Musical	Merrily We Roll Along	Nominated
2003	Drama Desk Award	Outstanding Actor in a Musical	Amour	Nominated
2003	Tony Award	Best Actor in a Musical	Amour	Nominated

== Music ==
Soundtracks

- "Tradition/To Life" (1999) - in celebrity concert to benefit A.I.D.S. research, recorded as The S.T.A.G.E. Series: Adler, Bock, Coleman.
- Barbara Cook Sings Mostly Sondheim (2001) - singles and duets recorded with Barbara Cook, such as "Into the Woods" and "Not While I'm Around".
- Grey Gardens (2009) - two duets recorded with Jessica Lange; "I Won't Dance" and "We Belong Together".
