= Mirvish Productions =

Canadian theatrical production company

- Founded: 1986
- Founders: David Mirvish; Ed Mirvish
- Type: Theatrical productions
- Location: Toronto
- Website: mirvish.com

Mirvish Productions, commonly known as Mirvish, is a Canadian theatrical production company, based in Toronto. Founded in 1986 by David Mirvish with his father, Ed Mirvish, it is the largest commercial theatre company in Canada. Mirvish Productions owns and operates four theatres in the downtown Toronto area: the Royal Alexandra Theatre, Princess of Wales Theatre, Ed Mirvish Theatre, and the CAA Theatre.

== History ==
=== Beginning and early years ===
In 1963, at the encouragement of his wife (Anne) and son (David), Ed Mirvish purchased the Royal Alexandra Theatre in Toronto, saving it from demolition. He spent several months renovating the theatre and installing a large marquee at the front of the theatre. The theatre re-opened on September 9, 1963, with the Canadian premiere of Never Too Late, which starred William Bendix. In the subsequent years, the Royal Alexandra Theatre was used as a "road house", which staged short touring productions from London and New York.

In 1982, London's The Old Vic theatre was placed for sale and ultimately purchased by Ed Mirvish for £550,000, outbidding Andrew Lloyd Webber. With his son David, they refurbished the theatre to allow it to return to staging productions. The theatre reopened on October 31, 1983 with The Queen Mother in attendance. Following mounting financial losses, Mirvish sold The Old Vic to a charitable trust in 1998, which will continue operating the theatre as a non-profit.

By 1985, Ed began to retire and transition out of the theatre industry. In 1986, David Mirvish sensed greater potential with the shows being staged by them, which led to the founding of Mirvish Productions in 1987.

In 1991, the Tomson Highway play, Dry Lips Oughta Move to Kapuskasing, was staged at the Royal Alexandra Theatre. It became the first play by an Indigenous author to be staged there, and was the first native Canadian play to receive a major commercial production in Canada.

=== Theatres ===
The first theatre used by Mirvish Productions was the Royal Alexandra Theatre, which was purchased by Ed Mirvish in 1963. In 1987, the theatre was named a National Historic Monument.

In 1991, Ed and David Mirvish began construction of a new theatre built on a vacant lot on King Street East in downtown Toronto. It was the first privately funded theatre to be built in Canada, since the Royal Alexandra Theatre in 1907. The new 2000-seat theatre was named the Princess of Wales Theatre in honour of Diana, Princess of Wales. The theatre opened on May 26, 1993, with a Canadian production of Miss Saigon that was produced in partnership with Cameron Mackintosh.

In 2001, Mirvish began leasing space at the Canon Theatre to present productions. As part of the lease agreement, Mirvish was granted the first right to purchase the theatre should it be placed for sale. This sale took place in 2008, when Key Brand Entertainment agreed to sell the Canon Theatre to Mirvish. As part of the sale, Mirvish also acquired the 700-seat Panasonic Theatre. Although the sale of Canon Theatre was challenged by Aubrey Dan, Mirvish won the protracted legal battle, ultimately giving Mirvish two Yonge Street theatres.

On December 6, 2011, Mirvish announced that the Canon Theatre would be renamed the Ed Mirvish Theatre in honour of Ed Mirvish, who died in July 2007.

On September 29, 2012, Mirvish Productions announced a plan to demolish the Princess of Wales Theatre in favour of a multi-purpose complex designed by Frank Gehry that would include an extensive artwork collection available for public viewing, as well as museums, condominium units, and retail spaces. However, following extensive consultations and criticism from city planners, Mirvish announced a revised plan in May 2014 that would save the Princess of Wales Theatre.

On December 1, 2017, the Panasonic Theatre was renamed the CAA Theatre as part of a marketing partnership between Mirvish Productions and CAA.

==== Theatre renovations ====
In 2016, following the closure of the Canadian production of Kinky Boots, the Royal Alexandra Theatre underwent a $2.5 million renovation. 250 seats were removed in favour of larger, more comfortable seats and greater leg room, and a general refurbishment of the theatre was undertaken.

In 2019, the façade of the Royal Alexandra Theatre was wrapped in blue for the Canadian production of Dear Evan Hansen. The blue wrap was removed after the production closed.

In 2021, the Ed Mirvish Theatre underwent an extensive renovation in preparation for the Canadian production of Harry Potter and the Cursed Child, which opened on May 31, 2022. The renovations, which cost $5 million, transformed the lobby areas and the auditorium and was done to truly immerse the audience in the play. This included a seat reduction, an aisle realignment, the addition of faux side and rear walls, and a new color palette and design work to match with the play's theme throughout the theatre.

=== Television ===
In 2008, Mirvish Productions partnered Andrew Lloyd Webber to produce a reality talent competition series, How Do You Solve a Problem Like Maria?, based on the 2006 BBC One series of the same name. The series aimed to find a Canadian actress to play Maria von Trapp in the 2008 Andrew Lloyd Webber and David Mirvish revival of Rodgers and Hammerstein's The Sound of Music in Toronto. The series premiered June 15, 2008, on CBC Television, and ended July 28, 2008. Elicia MacKenzie was named the winner, and played the lead role in the Canadian production. The runner-up, Janna Polzin, was later named the alternate Maria for the same production.

In 2012, Mirvish Productions again partnered with Webber to produce another reality talent competition series, Over the Rainbow. This series, which premiered in September 2012 on CBC, was to find a Canadian actress to play the lead role of Dorothy in a North American production of Andrew Lloyd Webber's stage musical adaptation of The Wizard of Oz. On November 5, 2012, Danielle Wade was named the winner. She originated the role of Dorothy at the Ed Mirvish Theatre in December 2012, as well as the subsequent North American tour.

Despite not winning the series, other contestants have gone on to perform lead roles in Canadian engagements of shows produced by Mirvish. The runner-up, Stephanie LaRochelle, made her Mirvish debut in the Canadian production of Dear Evan Hansen at the Royal Alexandra Theatre in 2019, when she was cast in the lead role of Zoe Murphy. The second runner-up, AJ Bridel, also made her Mirvish debut in the lead role of Lauren in the Canadian production of Kinky Boots in 2015 at the Royal Alexandra Theatre.

=== COVID-19 ===
On March 14, 2020, for the first time in the company's history, Mirvish Productions closed their doors and suspended all performances at their theatres due to public health concerns amidst the COVID-19 pandemic. The initial closures were planned to last for a month, with the performances of Hamilton and Come from Away being suspended. Due to province-wide shutdowns and restrictions implemented by the Ontario government, Mirvish's theatres remained closed indefinitely. This resulted in Hamilton's tour stop in Toronto ending abruptly, just one month into the planned three-month run.

Throughout the closures, Mirvish ran some virtual programming and entertainment. This included a YouTube web series Check in from Away, co-hosted by Come from Away cast member Steffi DiDomenicantonio and stage manager Lisa Humber. On August 24, 2021, Mirvish announced their 2021-22 subscription seasons to begin later that Fall. Mirvish's main subscription season resumed on November 30, 2021, with the 50th anniversary tour of Jesus Christ Superstar. However, on December 24, 2021, Mirvish cancelled the remaining two weeks of the show due to positive COVID tests within the cast and crew.

On December 15, 2021, the Canadian production of Come from Away returned to the Royal Alexandra Theatre for the first time since their forced closure in March 2020 because of the COVID-19 pandemic. However, a week after its re-opening, Mirvish was forced to pause performances of Come from Away because of positive COVID-19 tests. A week later, Mirvish announced that the Canadian production of Come from Away would close permanently, after 855 performances. This announcement was met with widespread shock from the Canadian theatre industry and many Canadian news outlets, with many expressing outrage at the lack of funding for commercial theatre companies. In an announcement on the closure, David Mirvish wrote:

“In other parts of the world, the government has stepped up to support the commercial theatre sector by offering a financial safety net for the sector to reopen and play during the pandemic, thus protecting the tens of thousands of good jobs the sector creates. That is the case in the US, the UK and Australia – where productions of Come From Away continue to play: in the US on Broadway and on tour, in London’s West End in the UK, and in Sydney, Australia. But in Canada there is no such government support. And without such a safety net it is impossible for the production to take yet another extended hiatus. The costs of reopening a second time are prohibitively high and risky. I know this news is shocking, and it causes me and our partners great pain to have to take this action, but we are simply out of options. The most responsible way forward is to close the production.”

On January 5, 2022, Mirvish announced a revised 2022 main subscription season. The planned West End transfer of Leopoldstadt was cancelled because of the continuing border closures in Canada and the large cast size, a few weeks before it was scheduled to open at the Princess of Wales Theatre. It was ultimately replaced with a transfer of Singin' in the Rain, that would be performed in September - October 2022. Pressure was similarly cancelled, and replaced by Jake Epstein's one-man show, Boy Falls From The Sky, which was added to main season subscription.

By August 2022, attendance at Mirvish shows showed signs of revitalization following several months of pandemic uncertainty and government-imposed capacity limits. On August 18, 2022, Mirvish said that the final three weeks of the pre-Broadway engagement of & Juliet were sold out and that they were unable to keep up with the demand for tickets to the show. Mirvish also noted that their new Canadian production of Harry Potter and the Cursed Child has been sold out since the start of their run. By the end of 2022, Mirvish had not cancelled a performance that year because of COVID-19, with The Globe and Mail noting the Canadian production of Harry Potter and the Cursed Child grossed approximately $2 million in sales over the last week of 2022 (setting a Canadian box office record for a non-musical play).

== Description ==
=== Schedule ===
Although there are some exceptions, shows programmed by Mirvish at one of their theatres generally perform the traditional 8-performance week. There are often evening performances that begin at either 7:30pm or 8:00pm from Tuesday through Saturday. There are "matinée" (afternoon) performances at either 1:30pm or 2:00pm on Wednesday, Saturday, and Sunday. Mirvish's theatres do not perform shows on Mondays and are considered to be "dark" that day. This is a similar performance schedule to what is often seen on Broadway.

=== Audience ===
Attending a live theatre show is often a popular tourist activity in Toronto, with Mirvish's theatres as being the opportunity to see major theatrical productions. Tickets for Mirvish shows are purchased exclusively through the official Mirvish channels, such as by phone or through their website. By 2019, Mirvish introduced a digital lottery system where customers can enter for a chance to purchase tickets to many of their shows at a significantly discounted rate. This was first notably used for the 2019 tour stop of Book of Mormon, introduced again in 2020 for Hamilton, and has since been used for many of the popular productions offered by Mirvish.

In an effort to attract high school and post-secondary students, Mirvish began offering special student rates to the off-Mirvish subscription season packages in 2020.

=== Programming and subscription seasons ===
Mirvish Productions often programs a wide range of shows into their theatres each year. Historically, musicals have tended to fare better with Mirvish's audiences than plays and are often more frequently programmed. Also, the types of shows that are often performed at Mirvish's theatres typically include well-known, international productions that originated on Broadway and/or London's West End. On occasion, Mirvish programs shows that originated in other countries, such as Australia (Muriel's Wedding) and South Korea (The Last Empress). Mirvish frequently programs shows that are promoted as pre-Broadway engagements that run for a limited time before later opening on Broadway. Recent examples of this include Aladdin in 2011, Ain't too Proud in 2018, and & Juliet in 2022. World premiere performances of shows are occasionally run by Mirvish, such as Jane Eyre in 1996, and Arrabal in 2014.

Many of the shows programmed by Mirvish are run through their two subscription seasons. The main subscription seasons often consists of popular musicals and plays from Broadway that are touring, pre-Broadway engagements, and transfers from London's West End. Many of the shows offered on the main subscription season often run for 6 to 7 weeks, and are performed at any of their four theatres. As of 2018, there are approximately 45,000 main season subscribers.

In 2012, Mirvish began offering an off-Mirvish subscription season, which is similar to off-Broadway. These are smaller scale shows, and are often co-produced with smaller Toronto-area theatres with the intention of marketing them to larger audiences. Shows included in the off-Mirvish subscription usually include productions that are "edgier" and often include more mature content than what is normally seen in the mainstream productions in the main subscription season. Dramatic plays and revues are commonly included in the off-Mirvish subscription seasons. The off-Mirvish subscription season has typically consisted of 3 productions, although 4 productions were included in the inaugural 2012-2013 season. Shows offered in the off-Mirvish subscription season typically run for 4 to 5 weeks, are normally performed at the CAA Theatre.

=== Sit-down productions ===
Mirvish often produces special Canadian engagements of shows on their stages, for either an extended engagement or open-ended runs (such as Come from Away) with no specified closing date. These local sit-down productions are similar to the local sit-down productions hosted in other major theatrical venues, such as Chicago or London, England. In many instances, though not necessarily all, these productions include casts that are entirely or mostly Canadian.

- Les Misérables, March 1989 - May 1990
- Miss Saigon, May 1993 - April 1995
- Crazy for You, December 1993 - December 1995
- The Who's Tommy: March - November 1995
- Beauty and the Beast: July 1995 - August 1997
- Jane Eyre, November 1996 - February 1997
- Rent, November 1997 - July 1998
- The Lion King, April 2000 - January 2004
- Mamma Mia!, May 2000 - May 2005
- The Drowsy Chaperone, May - July 2001
- The Producers, November 2003 - July 2004
- Hairspray, May - November 2004
- Lord of the Rings, February - September 2006
- We Will Rock You, March 2007 - May 2008; July 2008 - June 2009
- Dirty Dancing, October 2007 - March 2009
- The Sound of Music, October 2008 - January 2010
- Rock of Ages, April 2010 - January 2011
- Priscilla, Queen of the Desert, October 2010 - January 2011
- Billy Elliot the Musical: February - September 2011
- War Horse, February 2012 - January 2013
- The Wizard of Oz, December 2012 - August 2013
- Cats, May - September 2013
- Les Misérables, September 2013 - February 2014
- Once, February - June 2015
- Kinky Boots, June 2015 - May 2016
- Matilda, July 2016 - January 2017
- Beautiful: The Carole King Musical, June - September 2017
- Come from Away, March 2018 - March 2020; December 2021
- Dear Evan Hansen, March - July 2019
- Harry Potter and the Cursed Child, May 2022 - July 2023
- Six, September 2023 - May 2024
- Come from Away, September 2024 - May 2025
- The Lion King, November 2, 2024 - August 30, 2025
- & Juliet, December 2025 - August 2026

==== Long running productions ====
The following table lists the productions that have performed at least 100 performances continuously, or as part of special engagement or sit-down productions programmed by Mirvish. Productions that arrive as part of a tour, which normally run for 6 or 7 weeks, are not included in these totals. These figures assume the standard 8-week performance schedule used by Mirvish, which equals approximately 416 performances a year. All figures are approximate, unless otherwise cited.

Updated as of April 5, 2026

Rank	Title	Type	Opening date	Closing date	Performances	Additional information
1	Mamma Mia!	Musical	May 11, 2000	May 22, 2005	2,044	Longest running show and musical in Mirvish history
2	The Lion King	Musical	March 30, 2000	January 4, 2004	1,905	Original Canadian production (March 30, 2000 - January 4, 2004): 1,560 performances; Revival production (November 2, 2024 - August 30, 2025): 345 performances
3	Come from Away	Musical	February 13, 2018	December 22, 2021	1,110	Longest running Canadian show and musical; Original Canadian production (855 performances): played at the Royal Alexandra Theatre (February 13, 2018 - January 20, 2019); Elgin Theatre (February 5, 2019 - December 1, 2019); Royal Alexandra Theatre (December 19, 2019 - March 13, 2020; December 15–22, 2021); Revival production (255 performances): played at the Royal Alexandra Theatre between September 22, 2024 and May 4, 2025
4	Beauty and the Beast	Musical	July 25, 1995	August 30, 1997	874	
5	Crazy for You	Musical	December 1, 1993	December 31, 1995	866	
6	Miss Saigon	Musical	May 8, 1993	April 30, 1995	824	
7	We Will Rock You	Musical	March 14, 2007	June 28, 2009	788	Canadian production played at the Canon Theatre (March 14, 2007 - June 1, 2008); Panasonic Theatre (July 16, 2008 - June 28, 2009)
8	Les Misérables	Musical	March 15, 1989	May 26, 1990	647	Original production (March 15, 1989 - May 26, 1990): 499 performances; Revival production (September 27, 2013 - February 2, 2014): 148 performances
9	Dirty Dancing	Musical	October 31, 2007	March 29, 2009	582	
10	The Sound of Music	Musical	October 3, 2008	January 10, 2010	529	
11	Harry Potter and the Cursed Child	Play	May 31, 2022	July 2, 2023	444	Longest running play
12	Kinky Boots	Musical	June 16, 2015	May 15, 2016	384	
13	War Horse	Play	February 10, 2012	January 6, 2013	368	
14	The Producers	Musical	November 21, 2003	July 4, 2004	331	
15	Six	Musical	September 23, 2023	May 26, 2024	320	
16	Rent	Musical	November 25, 1997	July 26, 1998	312	
17	Rock of Ages	Musical	April 20, 2010	January 2, 2011	296	
18	The Who's Tommy	Musical	March 1, 1995	November 6, 1995	287	
19	The Wizard of Oz	Musical	December 20, 2012	August 18, 2013	277	
20	Hairspray	Musical	May 5, 2004	November 28, 2004	264	
21	Billy Elliot the Musical	Musical	February 1, 2011	September 3, 2011	244	
22	The Lord of the Rings	Musical	February 8, 2006	September 3, 2006	230	
23	Matilda the Musical	Musical	July 5, 2016	January 7, 2017	215	
24	Hamilton	Musical	February 22, 2023	August 20, 2023	207	
25	Dear Evan Hansen	Musical	March 5, 2019	July 21, 2019	160	
25	Once	Musical	February 10, 2015	June 28, 2015	160	
26	& Juliet	Musical	December 3, 2025		152	Currently running at the Royal Alexandra Theatre
27	Two Pianos Four Hands	Play	July 28, 1998	September 5, 1998	146	Original production (July 28, - September 5, 1998): 47 performances; Special revival engagements (September 18 - October 5, 2003): 21 performances; (October 29 - November 20, 2011): 27 performances; 20th Anniversary Reunion (June 4 - July 17, 2022): 51 performances
28	Jane Eyre	Musical	November 14, 1996	February 1, 1997	117	
29	Cats	Musical	May 28, 2013	September 1, 2013	112	

=== Awards ===
Many of the productions performed on Mirvish's stages are honoured by the annual Dora Mavor Moore Awards (commonly called the "Dora Awards"), which are given by the Toronto Alliance for the Performing Arts (TAPA) for the best in performing arts productions in the Toronto area. The Dora Award is the most prestigious award for Toronto's performing arts sector. Although similar in function to Broadway's Tony Awards or the Olivier Awards in London's West End, the Dora Awards do not often affect the Toronto theatre scene. This has been attributed to the lack of promotion of the Dora Awards ceremonies, confusing award categories, and that many of the shows nominated have already closed by the time of the awards ceremony.

== Theatrical subscription seasons ==
=== Main season ===
Season	Subscription shows						
1988-1989	Spoils of War	The Nerd	The Search for Signs of Intelligent Life in the Universe	Les Misérables	—N/a	—N/a	—N/a
1990-1991	Sarafina!	Penn and Teller: The Refrigerator Tour	The Heidi Chronicles	Kean, Or Disorder and Genius	Time and the Conways	Dry Lips Oughta Move to Kapuskasing	—N/a
1992-1993	The Secret Garden	Lost in Yonkers	Blood Brothers	The Good Times Are Killing Me	Miss Saigon	Guys and Dolls	—N/a
1993-1994	Man of La Mancha	Five Guys Named Moe	Crazy for You	—N/a	—N/a	—N/a	—N/a
1995-1996	Beauty and the Beast	The Master Builder	One for the Pot	Three Tall Women	—N/a	—N/a	—N/a
1996-1997	Jane Eyre	Death of a Salesman	The Glass Menagerie	Jolson	—N/a	—N/a	—N/a
1997-1998	The Importance of Being Earnest	Rent	Slava's Snowshow	Two Pianos Four Hands	—N/a	—N/a	—N/a
1998-1999	Racing Demon	Fame	Proposals	Master Class	Our Town	Oliver!	—N/a
1999-2000	The Pajama Game	Cabaret	Art	The Needfire	Enigma Variations	The Memory of Water	The Lion King
2000-2001	Mamma Mia!	Dame Edna: The Royal Tour	Stones in His Pockets	A Flea in Her Ear	The Drawer Boy	—N/a	—N/a
2001-2002	The Full Monty	Saturday Night Fever	The Graduate	Syncopation	Zadie's Shoes	Blast!	—N/a
2002-2003	Arturo Brachetti	Contact	Wingfield on Ice	Mambo Italiano	Aida	The Producers	—N/a
2003-2004	Chicago	Scaramouche Jones	The Adventures of a Black Girl in Search of God	Hairspray	Copenhagen	The Hollow Crown	Two Pianos Four Hands
2004-2005	The Last Empress	The Rat Pack: Live From Las Vegas	A Couple of Blaguards	Da Kink in My Hair	Wicked	Evita	—N/a
2005-2006	Les Misérables	Movin' Out	The Boy Friend	The Lord of the Rings	The Innocent Eye Test	Cirque Eloize: Nomade	Wingfield's Inferno
2006-2007	Martin Short: Fame Becomes Me	Spamalot	Legends!	Pippin	Orpheus Descending	The Phantom of the Opera	e-Dentity
2007-2008	Dirty Dancing	Twelve Angry Men	Sweeney Todd	The Life and Adventures of Nicholas Nickleby (Part 1)	The Life and Adventures of Nicholas Nickleby (Part 2)	We Will Rock You	—N/a
2008-2009	The Sound of Music	A Chorus Line	Medea	The Color Purple	Spring Awakening	Chitty Chitty Bang Bang	Riverdance^{a}
2009-2010	The Harder They Come	The Boys In The Photograph	Stuff Happens	Fiddler on the Roof	Little House on the Prairie	Young Frankenstein	Legally Blonde^{b}
2010-2011	Priscilla, Queen of the Desert	A Funny Thing Happened on the Way to the Forum	Billy Elliot	The Secret Garden	Sweet Charity	Calendar Girls	—N/a
2011-2012	The Railway Children	Private Lives	Chess	Mary Poppins	The Blue Dragon	War Horse	Hair
2012-2013	Backbeat	La Cage Aux Folles	Sister Act	Honeymoon in Vegas	The Wizard of Oz	The Book of Mormon	—N/a
2013-2014	Les Misérables	Aladdin	Once	Heartbeat of Home	Arrabal	The Last Confession	—N/a
2014-2015	Titanic	The Heart of Robin Hood	Our Country's Good	Arcadia	Blithe Spirit	Kinky Boots	Newsies
2015-2016	Motown	Cinderella	Gas Light	The Judas Kiss	If/Then	A Gentleman's Guide to Love and Murder	Matilda
2016-2017	Cuisine & Confessions	Come from Away	The Audience	The Bodyguard	Mrs Henderson Presents	Strictly Ballroom	Beautiful: The Carole King Musical
2017-2018	North by Northwest	The Curious Incident of the Dog in the Night-Time	Come from Away	An American in Paris	Annie	The King and I	—N/a
2018-2019	Ain't Too Proud	Charlie and the Chocolate Factory	School of Rock	The Play That Goes Wrong	The Last Ship^{c}	Dear Evan Hansen	Waitress
2019-2020	The Band's Visit	Piaf/Dietrich	Girl from the North Country	Anastasia	Hamilton	The Boy Friend^{d}^{e}	—N/a
2020-2021	The 2020-21 Mirvish subscription seasons were cancelled due to the COVID-19 pandemic. None of the shows originally scheduled for the season were performed.						
2021-2022	Jesus Christ Superstar	Room	Boy Falls From The Sky^{f}	Two Pianos Four Hands	Harry Potter and the Cursed Child	& Juliet	Singin' in the Rain^{g}
2022-2023	The Shark is Broken	Mean Girls	Fisherman's Friends	Pressure	Hamilton	Hadestown	—N/a
2023-2024	Six	In Dreams	Jagged Little Pill	42nd Street	Aladdin	Les Misérables	Tina: The Tina Turner Musical
2024-2025	Life of Pi	The Lion King	Moulin Rouge!	Just for One Day	Beetlejuice	Back to the Future	Natasha, Pierre & The Great Comet of 1812
2025-2026	MJ	Tell Tale Harbour	& Juliet	Some Like It Hot	Shucked	A Beautiful Noise	The Outsiders
2026-2027	Hell's Kitchen	The Karate Kid	Operation Mincemeat	13 Going On 30	Agatha Christie's The Mousetrap	Inside the Wreck of the Edmund Fitzgerald	Salesman in China

=== Off-Mirvish season ===
Season	Subscription shows				
2012-2013	Terminus	Without You	Clybourne Park	Mary Walsh's Dancing with Rage	—N/a
2013-2014	God of Carnage	Dead Metaphor	The Musical of Musicals (The Musical!)	—N/a	—N/a
2014-2015	Buyer & Cellar	Boom	Vanya and Sonia and Masha and Spike	—N/a	—N/a
2015-2016	Seminar	Bigmouth	Disgraced	—N/a	—N/a
2016-2017	Fight Night	My Night with Reg	Butcher	—N/a	—N/a
2017-2018	Salt-Water Moon	King Charles III	Fun Home	—N/a	—N/a
2018-2019	Oslo	Next to Normal	A Doll's House, Part 2	—N/a	—N/a
2019-2020	Us/Them	Room^{e}	Indecent^{e}	—N/a	—N/a
2020-2021	The 2020-21 Mirvish subscription seasons were cancelled due to the COVID-19 pandemic. None of the shows originally scheduled for the season were performed.				
2021-2022	Blindness	Room	Boy Falls From The Sky	—N/a	—N/a
2022-2023	Indecent	Things I Know to Be True	As You Like It, or The Land Acknowledgement	—N/a	—N/a
2023-2024	To Kill a Mockingbird	Pride and Prejudice* (*sort of)	Uncle Vanya	Rosencrantz and Guildenstern Are Dead	—N/a
2024-2025	The Thanksgiving Play	Titanique	Fifteen Dogs	Life After	—N/a
2025-2026	Bright Star	Ava: The Secret Conversations	The Woman in Black	Kimberly Akimbo	Cyrano
2026-2027	Our Little Secret: A True New Musical	Goblin: Christmas Carol	Prima Facie	Jackpot Twins	The Wrong Bashir

== Theatres and current or upcoming productions ==
Theatre	Address	Capacity	Current production	Type	Opening	Closing
CAA Theatre	651 Yonge St.	700	Our Little Secret: A True New Musical	Musical	November 3, 2026	November 22, 2026
Ed Mirvish Theatre	244 Victoria St.	2,300	Dirty Dancing	Musical	November 24, 2026*	January 10, 2027
Princess of Wales Theatre	300 King St. W	2,000	Dr. Seuss' How the Grinch Stole Christmas!	Musical	November 10, 2026	November 22, 2026
Royal Alexandra Theatre	260 King St. W	1,244	Operation Mincemeat	Musical	October 27, 2026	Open-ended run

- An * after the opening date indicates that the listed show has not yet opened, but is scheduled to open on the given date at that theatre.
- Capacity is based on the capacity listed for the respective theatre on the Mirvish Productions website.

== Notes ==
- ^a Riverdance replaced The Boys in the Photograph on the 2008-2009 subscription season.
- ^b Legally Blonde replaced Priscilla, Queen of the Desert on the 2009-2010 subscription season.
- ^c The Last Ship replaced Girl from the North Country on the 2018-2019 subscription season.
- ^d The Boy Friend replaced Hello, Dolly! on the 2019-2020 subscription season.
- ^e Due to the COVID-19 pandemic that emerged during the 2019-2020 season, The Boy Friend, Room, and Indecent were cancelled.
- ^f Boy Falls From The Sky replaced Pressure, and was added to the 2021-2022 main subscription season.
- ^g Singin' in the Rain replaced Leopoldstadt on the 2021-2022 subscription season.
- ^h Just for One Day replaced Mamma Mia! on the 2024-2025 subscription season.
