= Ali Momen =

Iranian-Canadian actor and singer

- Education: Sheridan College
- Occupations: Actor, singer
- Years active: 2008–present

Ali Momen is an Iranian-Canadian actor and singer. He starred in the 2015 film Beeba Boys, and has appeared in several television shows including recurring roles on Star Trek: Discovery, Workin' Moms, and Transplant. Momen also originated the role of Kevin J./Ali and others in the Canadian production of Come from Away.

== Early life ==
Momen was born in Iran, but moved to Canada with his family when he was three years old. He grew up in Thornhill, Ontario, where he attended Thornlea Secondary School. Momen originally enrolled at and attended York University to pursue law, but dropped out after two years. He enrolled in the musical theatre program at Sheridan College, where he graduated in 2006.

== Career ==
=== Television and film ===
In 2008, Momen had his first film role when he portrayed a suicide bomber in the film Traitor, which starred Don Cheadle. In a later interview, Momen appreciated the opportunity but admitted that he regrets taking the role because of how it contributes to the over-representation of Muslims as violent and as perpetrators of terrorism. Since then, Momen has starred in various television and film roles, including recurring roles on Star Trek: Discovery, the CBC comedy Workin' Moms, and the CTV drama Transplant.

In 2020, Momen stated that he was writing a film based on the Tehran Museum of Contemporary Art.

=== Theatre ===
In 2014, Momen starred as Prakash in a production of Sultans of the Street presented by Young People's Theatre in Toronto. For his performance, Momen was nominated for a Dora Award for Outstanding Individual Performance in the Theatre for Young Audiences division.

Momen starred as Abe in the Canadian premiere production of Disgraced, which played at the Panasonic Theatre between April 3 and 24, 2016. The drama set a box office record for the theatre, having been seen by over 10,000 patrons during its run. Momen then transferred with the play to the Citadel Theatre, where it played between January 21 and February 12, 2017. Momen later reprised his role when Disgraced returned to the Pansaonic Theatre in November 2017 due to popular demand.

In 2017, Momen appeared in the world premiere production of Monsoon Wedding. The musical, produced by Berkeley Repertory Theatre, was performed between May 5 and June 25, 2017.

Beginning in 2018, Momen portrayed the role of Kevin J., Ali and others in the Canadian production of Come from Away. The musical opened at the Royal Alexandra Theatre in February 2018, and he remained with the production until performances were suspended due to the COVID-19 pandemic. He returned to the show when performances resumed in December 2021, until Mirvish Productions announced they were forced to permanently close the show because of the lack of government support for the arts industry following the lockdowns. After this, Momen reprised his role of Kevin J., Ali, and others during the North American tour of Come from Away in 2022, as well as at a special concert staging of the musical in Gander.

Momen will reprise his role of Kevin J., Ali and others in the Canadian revival production of Come from Away. The musical will play at the Babs Asper Theatre in Ottawa between August 14 and September 1, 2024, before transferring to the Royal Alexandra Theatre where it will begin performances on September 22, 2024.

=== Business ===
Momen co-founded the dating app Bokay, which was officially launched in March 2024. Loosely inspired by the premise of Love Is Blind, Bokay users are instead required to get to know each other through a series of personality-revealing prompts before finally seeing photos of each other. In June 2024, "Juno" was launched as part of the app, which is an AI relationship coach that supports users on Bokay.

== Activism ==
In 2020, Momen began advocating for an "Arts New Deal", an initiative aimed at revitalizing the arts sector in Canada that has been severely impacted by the COVID-19 pandemic. Inspired by how President Franklin D. Roosevelt supported arts and culture workers during the Great Depression, Momen advocates for the Canadian government to pay artists to produce various types of work. Momen advocates for embedding art into all aspects of Canadian society, with a goal of promoting cultural growth and economic recovery through a more integrated and supported arts community.

In 2021, Momen announced that he would be seeking the Liberal nomination in the provincial riding of Toronto-St. Paul's. However, he lost the nomination race to Dr. Nathan Stall.

== Credits ==
=== Television ===
Year	Show	Role	Notes
2008	The Border	Ahmed	Episode S1.E8: "Enemy Contact"
2010	How to Be Indie	Baldev	Episode S1.E16: "How to Make the Most Out of Being a Host"
2011	Combat Hospital	Khan Saour	Episode S1.E5: "Hells Bells"
2012	The L.A. Complex	Navid	4 episodes
2012	Mayday	Saudi Air Traffic Controller	Episode S11.E9: "Under Pressure"
2013	Cracked	Rick Carga	Episode S1.E9: "Cherry Blossoms"
2013	Satisfaction	Douchebag #1	Episode S1.E7: "Janet"
2014	Space Riders: Division Earth	Pardeep	Recurring role: 3 episodes
2014	The Strain	Dr. William Lester	2 episodes: S1.E2: "The Box"; S1.E3: "Gone Smooth"
2016	Houdini & Doyle	Rustom Avari	Episode S1.E9: "Necromanteion"
2016	Kim's Convenience	Handsome Customer	Episode S1.E13: "Family Singing Contest"
2017	Incorporated	Mr. Tahan	Episode S1.E8: "Operational Realignment"
2017	Save Me	Plaid Shirt #2	Episode S1.E7: "Injuries Due to Distracted Walking"
2017	Played	Matthew	Episode S1.E7: "Ghosts"
2017–2019	Star Trek: Discovery	Specialist Kamran Gant	Recurring role: 5 episodes
2021	Coroner	Yash	Episode S3.E5: "Back to the Future"
2021	Nurses	Raja Khanna	Episode S2.E8: "Best Day Ever"
2021–2024	Hudson & Rex	David Aziz	2 episodes: S4.E5: "Rex to Riches"; S6.E8: "Doghouse"
2022–2023	Workin' Moms	Walker	Recurring role: 8 episodes
2022–2024	Transplant	Dr. Karim Esfahani	Recurring role: 9 episodes
2023	Accused	Principal Sam Canosa	Episode S1.E1: "Scott's Story"

=== Film ===
Year	Title	Role	Notes
2008	Traitor	Suicide Bomber #3	
2013	The Animal Project	Shaun	Uncredited
2015	Drift	Nadim	Short film
2015	Beeba Boys	Nep	
2021	PAW Patrol: The Movie	Additional voices	Voice role
2022	This Place	Behrooz	

=== Theater ===
Year	Production	Role	Location	Category	Ref.
2008	Wonderful Town	Greenwich Villager / Cadet	Festival Theatre	Regional / Shaw Festival	
2010	An Ideal Husband	Viscount de Nanjac	Festival Theatre	Regional / Shaw Festival	
2010	Serious Money	Zackerman	Studio Theatre	Regional / Shaw Festival	
2012	A Midsummer Night's Dream	Demetrius	High Park Amphitheatre	Regional / Canadian Stage Company	
2014	Sultans of the Street	Prakash	Susan Rubes Theatre	Regional / Young People's Theatre	
2016	Disgraced	Abe	Panasonic Theatre	Mirvish Productions	
2017	Disgraced	Abe	Citadel Theatre	Regional / Hope and Hell Theatre Company	
2017	Disgraced	Abe	CAA Theatre	Mirvish Productions	
2017	Monsoon Wedding	Vikram	Berkeley Repertory Theatre	World premiere	
2018	Come from Away	Kevin Jung, Ali, and others	Royal Manitoba Theatre Centre	Pre-Toronto engagement	
2018-2020, 2021	Come from Away	Kevin Jung, Ali, and others	Royal Alexandra Theatre	Canadian production / Mirvish Productions	
2022	Come from Away	Kevin Jung, Ali, and others	First National Tour		
2022	Come from Away	Kevin Jung, Ali, and others	Steele Community Centre	Concert staging: Gander	
2024	Come from Away	Kevin Jung, Ali, and others	Babs Asper Theatre	Pre-Toronto engagement: Ottawa	
2024–2025	Come from Away	Kevin Jung, Ali, and others	Royal Alexandra Theatre	Canadian production / Mirvish Productions	
2026	It's A Good Life If You Don't Weaken	Waleed	Theatre Aquarius	Regional/World Premiere	
