= Princess of Wales Theatre =

Toronto, Ontario Theatre

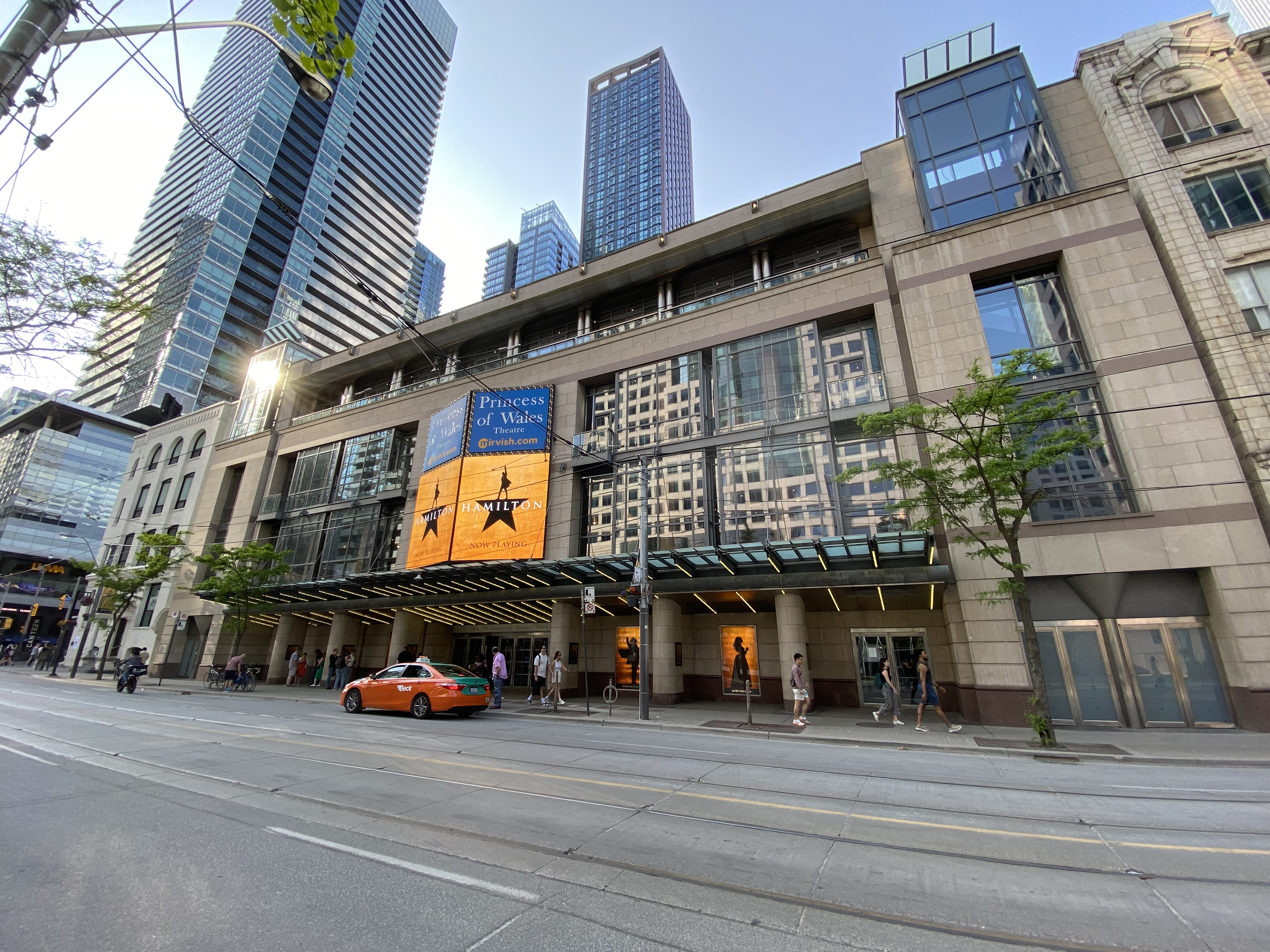
- Princess of Wales Theatre
- Interactive map of Princess of Wales Theatre
- Address: 300 King Street West; Toronto, Ontario; M5V 1J2
- Coordinates: 43.64694°N 79.38938°W
- Owner: Mirvish Productions
- Capacity: 2,000
- Public transit: St. Andrew station

Construction
- Opened: May 26, 1993; 33 years ago

Website
- mirvish.com/princess-of-wales-theatre

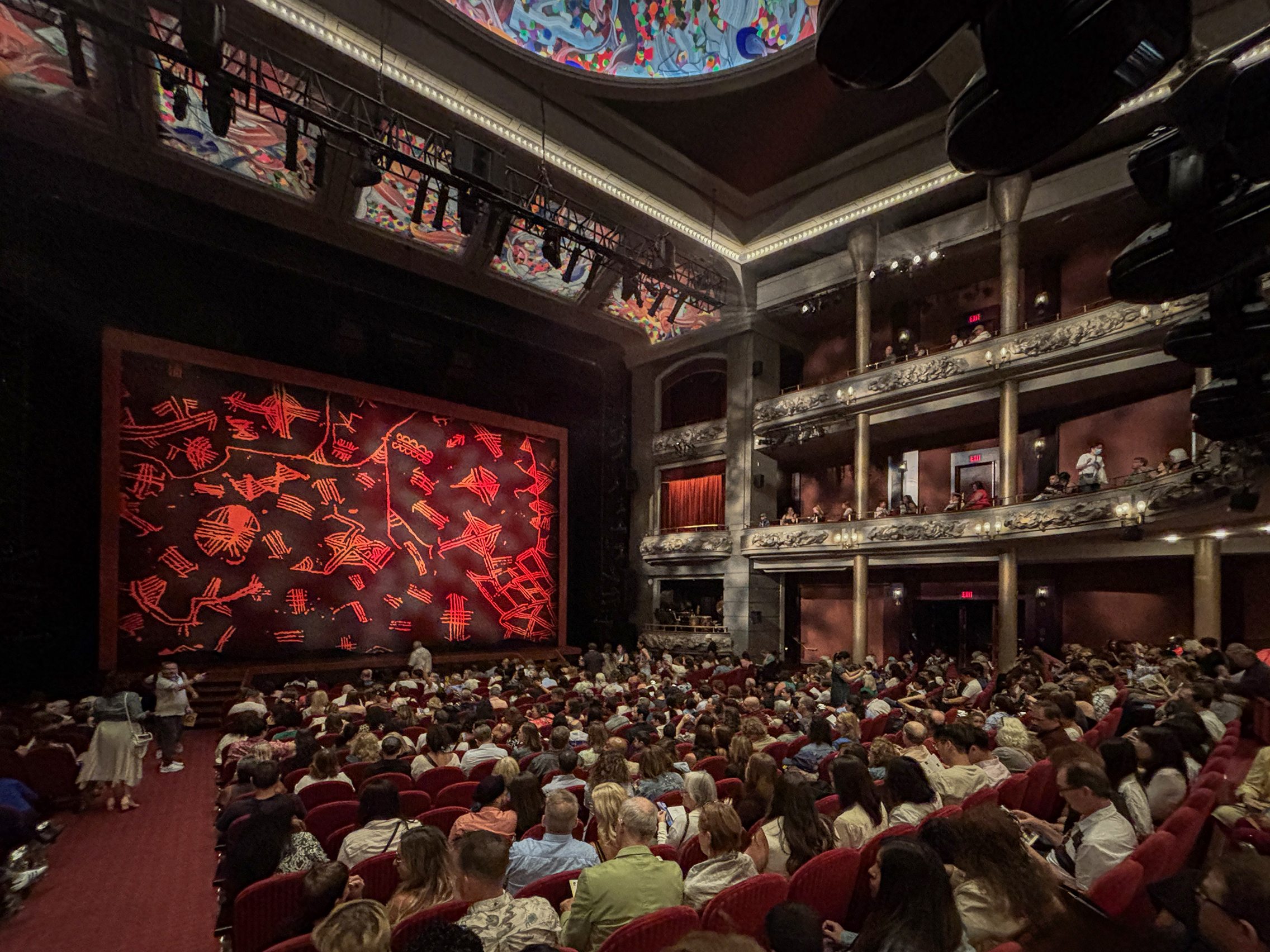
Theatre interior

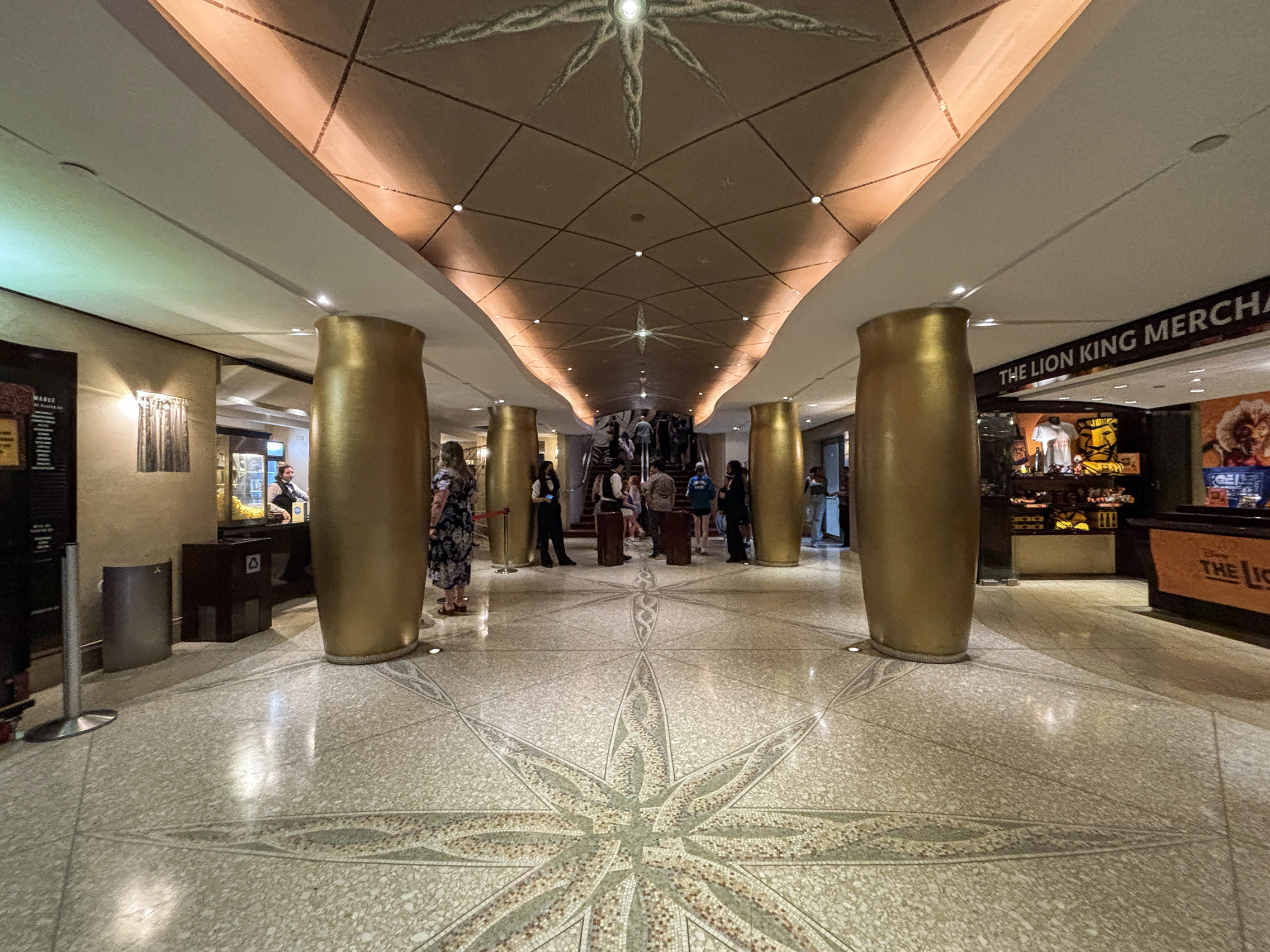
Ground floor lobby

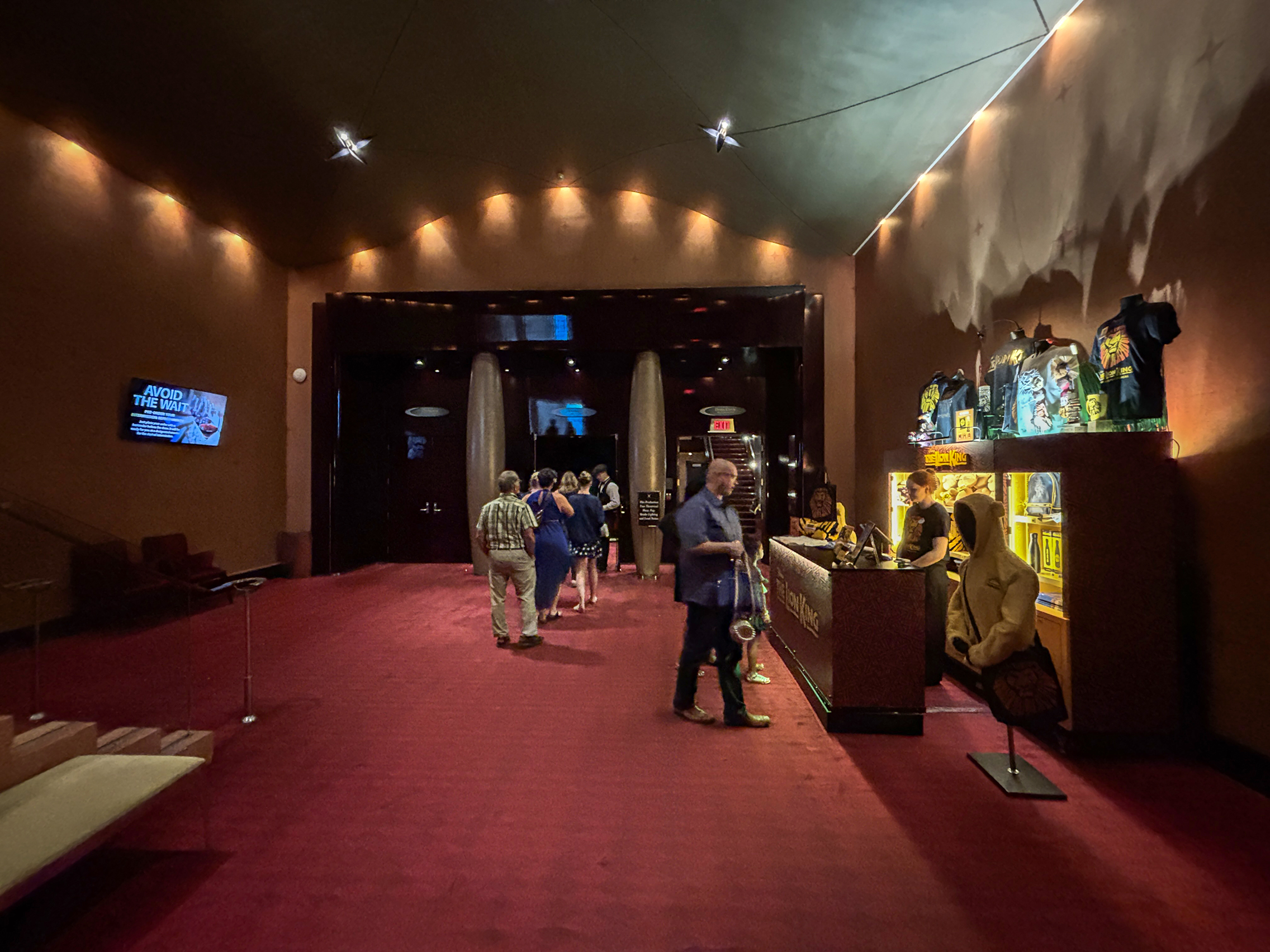
Lower Orchestra lobby

The Princess of Wales Theatre is a 2,000-seat live theatre in Toronto, Ontario, Canada. It is located on King Street West, in Toronto's downtown Entertainment District. The theatre's name has a triple meaning: it honours Diana, Princess of Wales, with whose consent the theatre was named; it links the building to its sister theatre, the Royal Alexandra, one block to the east, also named – with Royal assent – for a former Princess of Wales; and it recalls the Princess Theatre, Toronto's first "first-class legitimate" playhouse, that stood three blocks to the east until 1931.

== History ==
Ed and David Mirvish built the theatre as a state-of-the-art facility to stage large-scale musicals for long runs. The family's Mirvish Productions owns Toronto's Royal Alexandra, Ed Mirvish (formerly the Canon), and CAA (formerly the Panasonic) theatres. The Mirvish family owned the former Honest Ed's discount store and the Mirvish Village retail district, which are currently being redeveloped.

Construction began on August 6, 1991. The project architect was Peter Smith, of the Toronto firm Lett-Smith. Smith was also responsible for the duMaurier Theatre Centre in Toronto and for the restoration of the Grand Theatre, in London, Ontario.

For the Princess of Wales Theatre, David Mirvish commissioned a series of murals by American abstract expressionist painter and sculptor Frank Stella. The paintings—10,000 square feet (1,000 m^{2})—cover the auditorium ceiling dome, the proscenium arch, the walls of lounges and lobbies on all four levels of the theatre and the outside back wall of the fly tower. They are believed to comprise one of the largest mural installations of modern times. Stella also designed the decorative fronts of the boxes and balconies and the decorative end-caps of the each seating row. The theatre has seating on three levels—orchestra, dress circle and balcony—with elevator access to all levels and is configured as a traditional 19th century English proscenium theatre. Further, the entire theatre is barrier-free, enabling wheelchair access to all levels — not a common occurrence in Toronto considering the age of many of its theatres. The Princess of Wales Theatre is designed to incorporate both traditional and contemporary design elements.

The theatre opened on May 26, 1993, with a Canadian production of the megamusical Miss Saigon. Subsequent productions in the Princess of Wales have included the musicals Beauty and the Beast, The Lion King, Les Misérables, Hairspray, Chicago, Oliver!, Cabaret, The Phantom of the Opera, The Sound of Music, and Joseph and the Amazing Technicolor Dreamcoat.

A stage production of The Lord of the Rings made its world premiere in the facilities on February 8, 2006, losing money owing to terrible reviews and a lack of public interest. The original stage was gutted and replaced with a complex stage surface that includes three interlocking turntables and 17 independent elevators for this production.

The National Theatre's production of War Horse opened at the theatre on February 10, 2012.

On September 29, 2012, after operating for only 19 years, Mirvish Productions announced a plan to demolish the Princess of Wales Theatre in favour of a multi-purpose complex designed by Frank Gehry and which would include an extensive artwork collection available for public viewing, as well as museums, condominium units, and retail spaces. However, in response to criticism from city planners, Mirvish and Gehry announced a revised plan in May 2014 which would spare the structure.

== Notable productions ==
Productions are listed by the year of their first performance.

- 1993: Miss Saigon
- 1995: Beauty and the Beast
- 1997: The Importance of Being Earnest, Buddy: The Buddy Holly Story
- 1998: Slava's Snowshow, Chicago
- 1999: The Pajama Game, Fame, Les Misérables, Cabaret, Oliver!
- 2000: The Lion King
- 2004: The Hollow Crown, Hairspray
- 2005: Da Kink in My Hair, Evita, Les Misérables
- 2006: Lord of the Rings
- 2007: The Phantom of the Opera, Sweeney Todd
- 2008: Twelve Angry Men, The Life and Adventures of Nicholas Nickleby, The Sound of Music
- 2010: Young Frankenstein, Mamma Mia!, Legally Blonde, Priscilla, Queen of the Desert
- 2011: The Lion King, Hugh Jackman in Concert, Chess, Mary Poppins
- 2012: War Horse
- 2013: The Book of Mormon, Anything Goes, Les Misérables
- 2014: The Lion King, The Book of Mormon
- 2015: Blithe Spirit, Titanic, Motown: The Musical, The Phantom of the Opera
- 2016: If/Then, A Gentleman's Guide to Love and Murder
- 2017: The Book of Mormon, Strictly Ballroom, The Curious Incident of the Dog in the Night-Time, The Illusionists
- 2018: An American in Paris, The King and I, Ain't Too Proud, Charlie and the Chocolate Factory
- 2019: The Last Ship, Beautiful: The Carole King Musical, The Lion King, Cats
- 2021: Jesus Christ Superstar
- 2022: Room, & Juliet, Singin' in the Rain, Mean Girls, Joseph and the Amazing Technicolor Dreamcoat
- 2023: Hamilton, Jagged Little Pill, 42nd Street
- 2024: The Book of Mormon, Aladdin, Les Misérables, Wicked, The Lion King
- 2025: The Sound of Music
- 2026: Shucked, The Book of Mormon, A Beautiful Noise, The Outsiders

== See also ==
- Massey Hall
- Roy Thomson Hall
- Meridian Hall (Toronto)
- Royal eponyms in Canada
