= Room (play) =

- Original language: English
- Written by: Emma Donoghue (script & story); Cora Bissett (music & lyrics)
- Genre: Drama

Premiere
- Date: 10 May 2017
- Place: Theatre Royal Stratford East, London

Room is a play with songs based on the 2010 novel of the same name by Emma Donoghue, which was also adapted into a 2015 film of the same name. It tells the story of Ma, who was kidnapped as a teenager and locked inside a room for seven years by her captor. Longing to find a way out and escape, Ma is trapped with her five-year-old son, Jack, who has no concept of the world outside.

== Production history ==
On May 10, 2017, the play made its world premiere at the Theatre Royal Stratford East in Stratford, London. It was directed by Cora Bissett, and starred Witney Wright as Ma. The role of Jack was shared by Darmani Eboji, Taye Kassim Junaid-Evans, and Harrison Wilding. The production ran until June 3, 2022, before it transferred to the Abbey Theatre in Dublin, Ireland.

Room was scheduled to make its North American premiere at the Grand Theatre in London, Ontario on March 13, 2020, before travelling to the CAA Theatre in Toronto on April 4, 2020. However, the planned production was cancelled due to the COVID-19 pandemic. The play eventually made its North American premiere in London, Ontario at the Grand Theatre's Spriet Stage, playing between March 8 - 19, 2022. Room then transferred to the Princess of Wales Theatre in Toronto, Ontario. It opened on April 5, 2022, and closed on May 8, 2022. The Toronto cast starred Alexis Gordon as Ma, Brandon Michael Arrington as SuperJack, with Lucien Duncan-Reid and Levi Dombokah sharing the role of Jack.

On January 23, 2023, it was announced that the play would premiere on Broadway at the James Earl Jones Theatre for a limited engagement. The cast would include Adrienne Warren, Ephraim Sykes, and Kate Burton. Previews would begin on April 3, 2023, ahead of an official opening night on April 17, and would close on September 17, 2023. On March 16, 2023, it was announced that the production has been postponed indefinitely due to the departure of a lead producer.

== Cast and characters ==
Role	Theatre Royal Stratford East / Ireland	Grand Theatre / London, ON	Toronto
Role	2017	2022	2022
Ma	Witney White	Alexis Gordon	Alexis Gordon
Young Jack	Darmani Eboji; Taye Kassim Junaid-Evans; Harrison Wilding	Lucien Duncan-Reid; Isaac Chan	Lucien Duncan-Reid; Levi Dombokah
SuperJack	Fela Lufadeju	Brandon Michael Arrington	Brandon Michael Arrington
Old Nick	Liam McKenna	Ashley Wright	Ashley Wright
Grandma	Lucy Tregear	Tracey Ferencz	Tracey Ferencz
Grandpa / Doctor	Stephen Casey	Stewart Arnott	Stewart Arnott
Police / Interviewer / Popcorn Server	Janet Kumah	Shannon Taylor	Shannon Taylor

== Reception ==
Reviewing the world premiere production, Michael Billington of The Guardian gave the show four out of five stars. Describing the show as "deeply touching", he praised the staging of the show, and how it gives the audience a deeper insight into the relationship between Ma and Jack.

In his review of the Toronto production, Joshua Chong for the Toronto Star praised the stage direction, the visuals, and Gordon's "tour-de-force" performance as Ma, though he felt the songs were mostly unmemorable. J. Kelly Nestruck of The Globe and Mail similarly praised Gordon's performance and the intensity of the show, but felt the second act lacked focus.

== Awards and nominations ==
=== Toronto production ===
Year	Award	Category	Nominee	Result
2022	Dora Mavor Moore Awards	Outstanding Performance in a Leading Role	Alexis Gordon	Won
2022	Dora Mavor Moore Awards	Outstanding Lighting Design	Bonnie Beecher	Nominated
