= CAA Theatre =

Theatre in Toronto, Ontario, Canada

Coordinates: 43.6679°N 79.3856°W

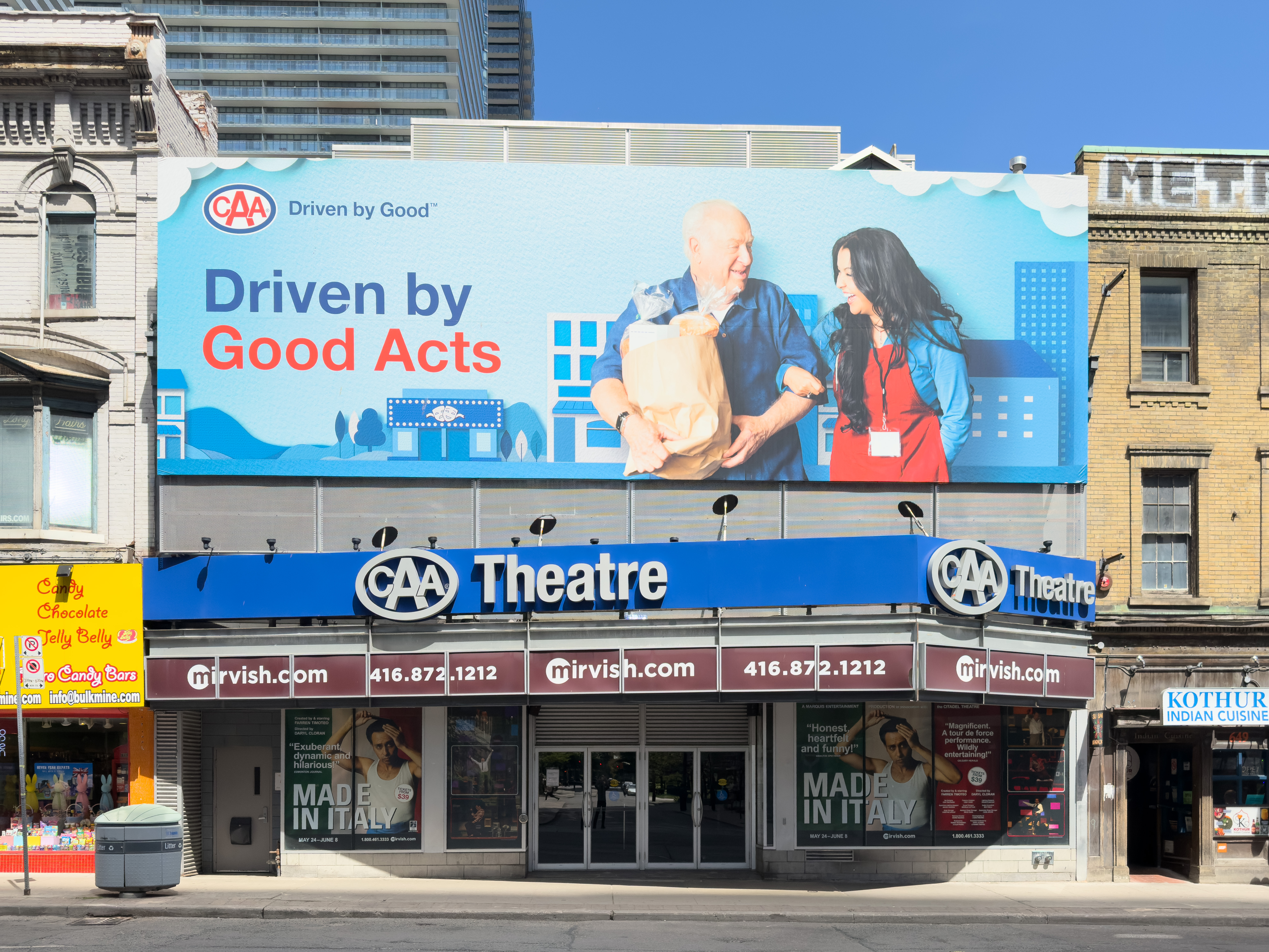
- Interactive map of CAA Theatre
- Former names: Panasonic Theatre
- Address: 651 Yonge Street; Toronto, Ontario; Canada
- Owner: KingSett Capital
- Operator: Mirvish Productions
- Capacity: 700

Construction
- Opened: 1911
- Rebuilt: 2005

Website
- mirvish.com/caa-theatre

The CAA Theatre, formerly the Panasonic Theatre, is a theatre located at 651 Yonge Street in Toronto, Ontario, Canada. It is operated by Mirvish Productions. On December 1, 2017, Mirvish Productions announced a marketing partnership with CAA South Central Ontario, which included renaming the venue that was known as the Panasonic Theatre.

In February 2023, the Toronto Star reported that Mirvish sold the property in 2015, and that the current owner, private equity firm KingSett Capital, was planning to redevelop the site as a high-rise mixed-use building.

== History ==
=== Early years ===
The original Second Empire building was built in 1911 as a private residence, then gutted and converted to a movie theatre in 1919 and known as The Victory. It was renamed The Embassy in 1934 and known by a number of other names over the next sixty years, including the Astor, the Showcase, and the Festival.

In the 1970s, the Festival Theatre was a key venue of the Toronto International Film Festival (then known as the Festival of Festivals).

=== Conversion to live theatre ===
In 1993, the building was renovated for live theatre productions and renamed The New Yorker Theatre.

=== Demolition and reconstruction ===
In 2004 and 2005, most of the building was demolished, with only the facade preserved. The old building was replaced by a new state-of-the-art live theatre and concert venue, known as The Panasonic Theatre. In 2005, the building was acquired by Live Nation and in 2008 by Mirvish Productions.

=== Site redevelopment ===
In February 2023, the Toronto Star reported that Mirvish sold the property in 2015, citing property records. City records also indicate the current owner, private equity firm KingSett Capital, had applied to the city to redevelop the site as a 76-storey, mixed-use building, retaining only the façade of the CAA Theatre building.

== Notable productions ==
Productions are listed by the year of their first performance.

=== Panasonic Theatre ===
- 2008: We Will Rock You
- 2009: My Mother's Lesbian Jewish Wiccan Wedding, Cloud 9
- 2010: My Mother's Lesbian Jewish Wiccan Wedding
- 2011: Ghost Stories, Two Pianos Four Hands
- 2012: Potted Potter, Bloodless, Without You
- 2013: Clybourne Park, Mary Walsh's Dancing with Rage, Cats, God of Carnage, The Musical of Musicals (The Musical!)
- 2014: Arrabal, Dead Metaphor, The Boy With Tape On His Face, Buyer & Cellar
- 2015: Boom, Vanya and Sonia and Masha and Spike, Seminar
- 2016: Bigmouth, Disgraced, Fight Night, Potted Potter
- 2017: My Night with Reg, Butcher, An Evening with Stephen Schwartz, Salt-Water Moon

=== CAA Theatre ===
- 2017: Million Dollar Quartet
- 2018: King Charles III, Fun Home, Potted Potter
- 2019: Oslo, A Doll's House, Part 2, Next to Normal, Piaf/Dietrich
- 2020: Us/Them
- 2022: Indecent
- 2023: Things I Know to Be True, As You Like It, or the Land Acknowledgement, Lasting Impressions in 3D: The Magic of the Impressionists, Pride and Prejudice* (*sort of)
- 2024: Uncle Vanya, Rosencrantz and Guildenstern Are Dead, Hyprov, Dog Man: The Musical, Gazillion Bubble Show, The Thanksgiving Play, Titanique
- 2025: Fifteen Dogs, Inside American Pie, Made in Italy, Bright Star, Ava: The Secret Conversations, The Woman in Black
- 2026: Kimberly Akimbo
