= Fisherman's Friends: The Musical =

2021 musical

Fisherman's Friends
- The Musical
- Official artwork
- Music: Various
- Lyrics: Various
- Book: Amanda Whittington
- Basis: The story and music of Fisherman's Friends and the 2019 film
- Premiere: 13 October 2021: Cornwall Playhouse, Hall for Cornwall, Truro
- Productions: 2021 Truro; 2022 UK and Ireland tour 2022 Toronto

Fisherman's Friends: The Musical is a stage musical with a book by Amanda Whittington based on the true story and music of the folk-music group Fisherman's Friends and the 2019 film Fisherman's Friends.

== Production history ==
=== World premiere: Truro, Cornwall (2021) ===
In January 2021, it was announced the musical would have its world premiere at the Cornwall Playhouse in the Hall for Cornwall, Truro beginning previews from 13 October 2021 with an official press night on 18 October 2021, running until 30 October. The production was the first to open the theatre following a major £20 million refurbishment. The production was directed by James Grieve, designed by Lucy Osborne with musical supervision by David White. Full casting was announced on 12 September 2021. The sold-out season broke box-office records in Hall for Cornwall.

=== UK and Ireland tour and Toronto (2022-23) ===
The musical began a UK and Ireland Tour on 1 September 2022 beginning at the Theatre Royal, Plymouth touring until 13 May 2023. Full casting was announced on 26 July 2022.

The musical will also make its North American premiere at the Royal Alexandra Theatre in Toronto, Canada running from November 27, 2022 until January 15, 2023.

== Musical numbers ==
The songs from the musical are including sea-shanties that have both been made famous by the group, as well as having been sung by them; some of the songs have been embellished for the stage, being performed more emotionally, with adapted lyrics or even in a different musical style, while all of the music heard is performed live by the on-stage company.

Act I

- "Nelson's Blood"
- "Pass Around the Grog"
- "Village by the Sea"
- "(What shall we Do with the) Drunken Sailor"
- "Widow Woman"
- "John Kanaka"
- "Bully in the Alley"
- "Leave her Johnny, Leave her"
- "Pay Me My Money Down"
- "A Ship in Distress"
- "Rattling Winches"
- "St Piran's Flag"
- "Cousin Jack"
- "One and All"
- "Little Liz (I Love You)"
- "Sloop John B"
- "South Australia"

Act II

- "John Kanaka"
- "Cadgwith Anthem (Robbers Retreat)"
- "Sailor ain't a Sailor"
- "Haul away Joe"
- "Shanty Man / Safe and Sound"
- "Crossing the Bar"
- "Blow the Man Down"
- "Home from the Sea"
- "The Tidal pool"
- "The Leaving Shanty"
- "Fisherman's Blues"
- "Village by the Sea (Reprise)"
- "No Hopers, Jokers & Rogues"

== Cast and characters ==
Characters	Truro	UK and Ireland tour / Toronto
Characters	2021	2022
Danny	Calum Callaghan	Jason Langley
Alwyn	Parisa Shahmir	Parisa Shahmir
Maggie	Susie Blake	Susan Penhaligon
Sally	Georgia Bruce	Hazel Monaghan
Jim	Deka Walmsley	James Gaddas
Leadville	Mensah Bediako	Anton Stephans
Jago	Robert Duncan	Robert Duncan
Ben	Edward Rowe	Dakota Starr
Dinger	Rakesh Boury	does not appear
Archie	Hadrian Delacey	Hadrian Delacey
Wiggie	Matt Slack	Pete Gallagher
Rowan	Dan Buckley	Dan Buckley
Leah	Deborah Tracey	Fia Houston-Hamilton
Eddy	did not appear	John O'Mahony
Morwenna	did not appear	Louisa Beadel
Grace	did not appear	Beccy Hurst
Owen	did not appear	James William-Pattison (MD)
Ensemble	did not appear	Hazel Simmons; Janet Mooney; Dominic Brewer; Martin Carroll
Musicians	James William-Pattison; Annie Grace; John O’Mahony; Louisa Beadel; Hazel Askew; Alfie Gidley; James Findlay (MD)	Hazel Askew; Mel Biggs; Alfie Gidley; James Findlay (MD)
