= Tell Tale Harbour =

2022 musical

- Promotional poster
- Music: Alan Doyle; Bob Foster
- Lyrics: Alan Doyle; Bob Foster
- Book: Alan Doyle; Adam Brazier; Ed Riche
- Setting: Atlantic Canada
- Basis: The Grand Seduction by Ken Scott; Michael Dowse
- Premiere: June 14, 2022: Confederation Centre of the Arts, Charlottetown

Tell Tale Harbour is a musical comedy with music and lyrics by Alan Doyle and Bob Foster, and a book by Doyle, Adam Brazier, and Ed Riche. It is based on the 2013 Canadian comedy film The Grand Seduction by Ken Scott and Michael Dowse. The musical, like the film, follows a small town who work together to try to convince a visiting doctor to make their beloved harbour village his new home.

== Premise ==
The musical is set in the fictional town of Tell Tale Harbour, a small harbour community in Atlantic Canada. The community is struggling due to the closure of the fish factory. However, the community is being considered for a frozen french fry facility, if the residents can manage to hire a full-time resident doctor. Led by the mischievous Frank, the residents of Tell Tale Harbour try to work together to lie, cheat, and con a visiting doctor to live and practice in their community.

== Production history ==
In November 2021, it was announced that Alan Doyle would star in Tell Tale Harbour, which he had co-created with Adam Brazier and Ed Riche.

Tell Tale Harbour premiered at the Charlottetown Festival in 2022. It played between June 14 and September 24, 2022, and performed to sell-out audiences. The production set a record for ticket sales at the Confederation Centre of the Arts, becoming the top selling show in the festival's history. The production was directed by Jillian Keiley and choreographed by Linda Garneau.

Following the original production, David and Hannah Mirvish encouraged the show's creative team to expand and refine the musical. The reworked musical, which includes new songs, returned to the Charlottetown Festival with direction by Brian Hill and choreography by Robin Calvert. It ran between June 14 and August 29, 2025. Following this run, the musical transferred to Toronto, where it played at the Royal Alexandra Theatre between September 23 and November 2, 2025.

== Cast and characters ==
Role	Charlottetown	Charlottetown/Toronto
Role	2022	2025
Frank	Alan Doyle	Alan Doyle
Kathleen	Michelle Bardach	Melissa MacKenzie
Dr. Chris	Jahlen Barnes	Kale Penny
Yvon	Laurie Murdoch	Laurie Murdoch
Vera	Charlotte Moore	Susan Henley
Barbara	Alison Woolridge	Alison Woolridge
Henry	Jacob MacInnis	Daniel Williston
Gus	Cameron MacDuffee	Joel Cumber
Gina	Marlane O'Brien	Gabrielle Jones
Louise	Alana Hibbert	Karen Burthwright
Marie	Marquita Walsh	AP Bautista
Gord / Chip	Stephen Guy-McGrath	Stephen Guy-McGrath

== Cast recording ==
A cast recording featuring the cast of the original 2022 production was released.
