= Two Pianos Four Hands =

Canadian musical comedy play

2 Pianos 4 Hands
- Written by: Ted Dykstra; Richard Greenblatt
- Characters: Ted; Richard

Premiere
- Date: April 1996
- Place: Tarragon Theatre, Toronto
- Official website

Two Pianos Four Hands, also referred to as 2 Pianos 4 Hands, is a Canadian musical comedy play, written and originally performed by Ted Dykstra and Richard Greenblatt. It follows Ted and Richard, two boys who aspire to become famous classical pianists. The play follows their journey from childhood, and as the boys grow older, their competitions and music auditions. Two Pianos Four Hands premiered at the Tarragon Theatre in Toronto in 1996, and has since been staged on five continents and has been regarded as one of the most successful Canadian plays.

Based loosely on their own lives, Dykstra and Greenblatt have described Two Pianos Four Hands as a comedic play that features music and pianos. The show is named after the piano duet term, piano four hands, which involves two pianists playing the same piano simultaneously. They arrived at the play's name, Two Pianos, Four Hands, since each of the two pianists play their own piano (a piano duo).

== Premise ==
At the start, Ted and Richard are two young boys in Canada with aspirations of becoming world-famous classical pianists. They learn to play the piano and endure pushy parents, eccentric teachers, endless hours of repetitive practice, and stage fright. Gradually, Ted and Richard mature and their skills improve. As the boys befriend and compete with one another, they are also auditioning for music festivals and music conservatories. The boys begin to realize the difference between being 'good' and 'great'.

When Ted and Richard are young boys, they alternate performing as solo pianists. Meanwhile, the other plays a composite of pushy and eccentric adults in the child's life. Later on in the show, both Ted and Richard perform together.

== Production history ==
Dykstra and Greenblatt met in 1993 while working on So You Think You're Mozart, produced by Chamber Concerts Canada. At the encouragement of the associate artistic director of Tarragon Theatre, Andy McKim, the two realized their similar stories and began conceptualizing ideas for the play. In 1994, Dykstra and Greenblatt formed the production company "Talking Fingers" to further develop and workshop the play, which was originally 25 minutes long. After a successful workshop presentation, an expanded 90-minute version of Two Pianos Four Hands was then added to Tarragon Theatre's 1995-96 main season.

During its initial run, David Mirvish took notice and encouraged Dykstra and Greenblatt to commercially produce Two Pianos Four Hands. After the play closed at the Tarragon Theatre, it was extended further to 2 hours and embarked on a commercially produced Canadian tour.

=== Original cast ===
Two Pianos Four Hands premiered at the Tarragon Theatre, in Toronto, Ontario, with previews starting in April 1996, before officially opening on May 13, 1996. It closed on August 24, 1997, before embarking on a brief Canadian tour.

With the support of David and Ed Mirvish, Two Pianos Four Hands transferred to an off-Broadway theatre. The play opened at the Promenade Theatre on October 30, 1997. The off-Broadway engagement at the Promenade Theatre closed on May 10, 1998, after 231 performances. The show was scheduled to transfer to the Kennedy Center in Washington, D.C.; however popular demand led to the play being transferred to another off-Broadway venue. Dykstra and Greenblatt starred in the production at the Kennedy Center, and the subsequent tour stops across Western Canada.

In late 1999, Dykstra and Greenblatt embarked on an international tour with Two Pianos Four Hands. This included an extended three-month production, first performed on October 5, 1999, at the Comedy Theatre in London's West End, and a multi-week engagement in Japan. In 2003, Two Pianos Four Hands played a special engagement at the Elgin Theatre in Toronto.

Beginning in 2011, Dykstra and Greenblatt embarked on a 'farewell tour' with the show. This tour made stops across Canada, including extended stops in Ottawa and Toronto, as well as in major American markets Chicago, New York, Los Angeles, and Washington. The final performance was in November 2013 at the Citadel Theatre in Edmonton.

In August 2021, Mirvish Productions announced a special limited engagement of 2P4H, that will star Dykstra and Greenblatt for the first time since the creators retired from the show in 2013. The show opened at the Royal Alexandra Theatre on June 4, 2022 and closed on July 17, 2022.

=== Other productions ===
The 1998 off-Broadway revival was the first time a production of Two Pianos Four Hands was performed without Dykstra and Greenblatt. The cast included Andrew Lippa as Ted and Jed Rees as Richard. Lippa and Rees also continued with the play for its first US national tour in 1998 and 1999.

In 2006, another North American tour began, this time starring Tom Frey as Ted and Richard Carsey as Richard.

Since Dykstra and Greenblatt's retirement from the show in 2013, several regional productions of Two Pianos Four Hands have been performed across North America and internationally. In 2019, an extended production of the play opened at the Cincinnati Playhouse in the Park, which starred Jefferson McDonald and Matthew McGloin. The National Arts Centre in Ottawa also opened a production of the show, which starred Reza Jacobs and Max Roll, and was directed by Greenblatt.

=== Recordings and other media ===
The final performance of the 'farewell tour' starring Dykstra and Greenblatt was recorded live at the Citadel Theatre in November 2013, and released for sale in early 2014.

On April 6, 2021, it was announced that the filmed recording of the 2013 performance would become available for streaming through BroadwayHD, to coincide with the show's 25th anniversary.

== Casting history ==
In the show's early years, Dykstra and Greenblatt performed it almost exclusively. As the demand for productions of the show increased, it became necessary to audition other actors for the roles. However, the producers encountered challenges in the audition process because of the unique demands of the show. This is because the show requires actors to play piano at a conservatory level while having sufficient acting and comedic skills.

The principal original casts of notable stage productions of Two Pianos Four Hands:

Role	Tarragon Theatre	Canadian tour	Off-Broadway	Kennedy Center / 2nd Canadian tour	Off-Broadway revival	US tour	West End	Tokyo, Japan	Toronto	North American tour	Farewell tour	Canadian regional	Cincinnati	Toronto
Role	1996	1996–1997	1997–1998	1998–1999	1998	1998–1999	1999	2003	2003	2006	2011–2013	2018–2019	2019–2020	2022
Ted	Ted Dykstra	Ted Dykstra	Ted Dykstra	Ted Dykstra	Andrew Lippa	Andrew Lippa	Ted Dykstra	Ted Dykstra	Ted Dykstra	Tom Frey	Ted Dykstra	Reza Jacobs	Jefferson McDonald	Ted Dykstra
Richard	Richard Greenblatt	Richard Greenblatt	Richard Greenblatt	Richard Greenblatt	Jed Rees	Jed Rees	Richard Greenblatt	Richard Greenblatt	Richard Greenblatt	Richard Carsey	Richard Greenblatt	Max Roll	Matthew McGloin	Richard Greenblatt

== Music ==
The two-hour version of Two Pianos Four Hands normally features samples of 20 to 30 musical pieces, primarily classical numbers such as pieces by Bach and Beethoven, and some other jazz standards and rock numbers. Various pop songs and other famous piano songs are interspersed throughout the show and in the medley at the end of the show, including snippets of songs by Elton John, John Lennon, and Linus' song from the Peanuts cartoons. All music in Two Pianos Four Hands is performed live by the actors portraying Ted and Richard, without outside accompaniment.

The specific chronology of the songs occasionally varies between productions, and in some other instances, additional songs are included. The following song chronology is as described in the 2012 script of the play.

Act I

- "Concerto in D minor, 1st movement" (J. S. Bach)
- "Sonatina No. 6 in F major" (Beethoven)
- "Sonata Facile in C major, 1st movement" (Mozart)
- "Sonata for One Piano, Four Hands in D major, 1st Movement" (Mozart)
- "In der Halle des Bergkönigs", Peer Gynt, Suite No. 1 (Edvard Grieg)
- "Concerto in D minor, 1st movement" (Bach)

Act II

- "Prelude in D-flat major" (Chopin)
- "Leyenda" (Isaac Albéniz)
- "Rondo for Two Pianos, Four Hands in C major" (Chopin)
- "Fantasiestücke No. 12" (Schumann)
- "Pathétique Sonatina No. 8 in C minor, 1st and 2nd movements (Beethoven)
- "Ballade No. 2 in F major" (Chopin)
- "Mephisto Waltz No. 1" (Franz Liszt)
- "A Medley of Pop Tunes"
- "Impromptu in A-flat, from D. 935" (Schubert)
- "Piano Man" (Billy Joel)
- "Concerto in D minor, 1st movement" (Bach)

== Reception ==
Two Pianos Four Hands has received critical and commercial acclaim.

William Triplett of The Washington Post gave a positive review of the 1998 Kennedy Center production, praising the script and acting. Hailing the show as a "crescendo of pleasure", Triplett wrote, "The show's liveliness and strength derive from the duo's ability to look back not in anger but affection, not with nostalgia but clarity. They zero in on the weird mix of absurdity and logic that always seems to develop whenever kids are forced to assume artistic ambition. The result is a little more than two hours of big laughs -- not just at the eccentric and dysfunctional people who terrorized their youth but at themselves as well."

Reviewing the 2011 tour stop in Toronto, Paula Citron wrote that 2P4H is a show you can see "over and over again and still find yourself laughing." Meanwhile, Mark Andrew Lawrence of BroadwayWorld praised the show's constant humor and heart, pointing out the show is an even bigger success likely because non-classical music aficionados can easily enjoy the show. Lawrence ended the review, writing, "For the uninitiated be prepared for a show filled with humor and heartbreak and some beautiful music all done in perfect harmony."

In a review of the Ottawa production, Ryan Pepper praised the show's relatability and appeal to broader audiences, with a constant stream of humour mixed with some heartfelt moments.

== Awards and honors ==
The play has received multiple awards and honors:

- In 1996, it won a Dora Award for Outstanding Production.
- In 1997, Dykstra and Greenblatt received a Chalmers Award, a Canadian National Award, for playwriting.
- In 1997, it was named in the "Top 10 Productions of the Year" list by Clive Barnes of the New York Post
- In 2006, Two Pianos Four Hands was named the "Outstanding Touring Production" by the Connecticut Theatre Critics Circle.
