= Boom (play) =

boom is a play by Peter Sinn Nachtrieb which premiered in 2008 at Ars Nova Theater in New York, New York. The Theatre Communications Group (TCG) counted boom as the most-produced play in the US during the 2009-2010 theatre season.

== Plot summary ==
Jules, a grad student in marine biology, and Jo, a journalism student, meet one Saturday night in Jules's small underground laboratory on a university campus, after Jo answers Jules's online personal ad offering an encounter that promises “sex to change the course of the world.” During his research on a deserted tropical island, Jules discovered patterns among the behavior of fish that seemed to portend a premature end to most forms of earthly life. So he has turned his tiny lab/apartment into a place to wait out the disaster and begin remaking humanity. A third character, Barbara, is the audience's guide in her portrayal of the end of civilization thousands of years earlier.

== Production history ==
Developmental reading, part of The Playwrights Foundation In the Rough series, May 2007, directed by Kent Nicholson.

Workshop production at Brown/Trinity Playwrights Rep, July 2007, directed by Ken Prestininzi.

World Premiere at Ars Nova, New York City, March 2008, directed by Alex Timbers.

Woolly Mammoth Theatre Company, Washington DC, November 2008, directed by John Vreeke.

Seattle Rep, Seattle, WA, November 2008, directed by Jerry Manning.

Cleveland Public Theatre, November 2008.

Shimberg Playhouse, David A. Straz Center for the Performing Arts, Tampa, Florida by Jobsite Theater Mar. 11 – 28, 2010.

Directed by Kari Goetz.

Cast

- Summer Bohnenkamp-Jenkins as Barbara
- Chris Holcom as Jules
- Geneva Rae as Jo.

Boom! by Jobsite Theater

Off the Wall Productions, Washington, Pennsylvania. March 2011.

Directed by Michael E. Moats.

Cast

- Rachel Downie as Barbara
- Matt Henderson as Jules
- Lauren Michaels as Jo

== Critical reception ==
Theater scholar Jordan Schildcrout analyzes boom as an "apocalyptic comedy" that "wrestles with dominant ideologies about sex, reproduction, and the future." In examining reviews of different productions of the play, he notes:

Most theatre critics reviewed boom enthusiastically, admiring its synthesis of farcical humor and apocalyptic themes. Many noted the “edgy” and sexy energy of the comedy, praising it as “screwball,” “oddball,” and “wacked-out,” but had difficulty articulating the play’s more thoughtful underpinnings. Ben Brantley of the New York Times astutely recognized the play’s concern with “our enduring fascination with and need for myths about the beginning of life as well as its end,” while Chris Jones of the Chicago Tribune dismissed the play because he didn’t find it “credible.”
