= Us/Them =

2014 Belgian play by Carly Wijs

Us/Them (Dutch: Wij/Zij; French: Nous/Eux) is a 2014 play by Belgian writer Carly Wijs about the Beslan school siege. It uses two actors and is one hour long. BRONKS, a Brussels-based company, produces Us/Them.

Wijs stated that the play "is an attempt to talk about something that is supposed to be an impossible subject for children. It’s an attempt to talk about it to everyone, actually." Rosemary Waugh wrote in Exeunt Magazine that the play's title suggested that "the relationship between different groups" is its most important theme.

In Dutch-speaking Belgium the play was rated for ages nine and above, while in London the play was rated for ages twelve and above.

== Background ==
Wijs, from Brussels, noted that her son reacted to the news coverage of the Westgate shopping mall attack in Nairobi, Kenya in a manner she described as "matter-of-fact, very distanced way", differing from "the emotional way an adult would react to such news." Wijs watched the BBC documentary Children of Beslan and noted the interview subjects, all children who survived the Beslan incident, reacted in manners similar to that of her child. She decided to make a play for children about Beslan. Wijs used her own son as a barometer for making the play, and she believed she was more courageous in writing the play as she was not accustomed to writing for children.

== Contents ==
The actors play a boy character and a girl character; both do not have their names stated. Within the play the characters portray other people, but otherwise nobody else is present.

The stage design represents the school and gymnasium, including the wires that were used to hold the bombs. The effect of explosions is simulated with balloon pops.

In the beginning the boy and girl try to recreate a map of Beslan and their school, but have trouble as they do not remember things the same way. Afterwards the actors set up the depiction of the gymnasium where the hostages were held. The play portrays the first day of school, the hostage-taking, and the captivity in the gymnasium. The play depicts a hoped-for alternative ending where the children's fathers rescue them, but this does not happen and the children's hopes fade. The hopeful alternative ending uses music from Mission: Impossible.

In the true ending the actors portray the removal of bodies, including that of a girl who wished to become famous on television and gets fame post-mortem. During the removal of the girl, the media misrepresents a woman who sneezes as a woman who is crying. Claire Allfree of The Daily Telegraph stated that despite the knowledge that negative events will occur later, "this often very funny piece consistently and cleverly frustrates that expectation" since the characters "deflect the enormity of what is happening with curiosity and laughter."

== Production ==
The play first opened in 2014. As of 2017 all productions in all languages used Wijs as the director and Flemish Belgian actors Roman van Houtven and Gytha Parmentier.

In Belgium it was performed in Dutch and French. In addition to Belgium, the play was performed in France and the United Kingdom. In the UK it debuted at the Edinburgh Festival and was later performed at the Royal National Theatre in London.

== Reception ==
In Dutch-speaking Belgium there were, compared to the United Kingdom, more relaxed ideas regarding content for children's theatre; despite this, initially there were concerns at some theatres that families would be turned off by the subject matter.

The summer 2016 performance at the Edinburgh Festival sold out.

Susannah Clapp of The Observer ranked the play three of five stars. Lyn Gardner of The Guardian ranked the 2016 Edinburgh performance five of five stars. Allfree gave the 2017 London performance four of five stars. David Pollock of The Scotsman ranked the 2016 Edinburgh performance four of five stars, as did Allan Radcliffe of The Times.

Paul Taylor of The Independent wrote that the play is "a remarkable feat of theatre" until the ending, which he says "goes astray".
