= The Hollow Crown (anthology) =

The Hollow Crown is an anthology for stage performance, devised by John Barton in 1960 for the Royal Shakespeare Company (RSC). It presents in dramatic form speeches, documents, gossip and music, associated with the British monarchy. The piece covers the period from William the Conqueror to Queen Victoria. It is written for four speakers, three singers and an accompanist.

Barton drew on many sources for his anthology including the words of English kings and queens, extracts from medieval and 16th and 17th century chronicles, Shakespeare, courtiers, diarists, poets and novelists. The piece remained in the RSC's repertory for more than forty years, with frequent revivals featuring numerous RSC stars.

== Background ==
When Peter Hall established the Royal Shakespeare Company (RSC) in 1960 he invited John Barton, a Cambridge don, to become a director. Barton had directed numerous productions for the Marlowe Society; his first production for the RSC was The Taming of the Shrew starring Peggy Ashcroft and Peter O'Toole. While Barton and Hall were preparing The Wars of the Roses – an epic adaptation of four of Shakespeare's history plays – Barton devised a small-scale anthology, The Hollow Crown, for a one-off Sunday evening performance, as the RSC's contribution to Stratford-upon-Avon's annual poetry festival.

== Premieres and production history ==
The Hollow Crown was first given at the Royal Shakespeare Theatre, Stratford-upon-Avon, on 4 September 1960, featuring Barton together with Max Adrian, Paul Hardwick and Dorothy Tutin. The piece was next presented by the RSC at the Aldwych Theatre, London, on 19 March 1961, again as a one-off Sunday performance. Adrian, Barton and Tutin reprised their Stratford performances and Richard Johnson replaced Hardwick; the four musicians were Richard Golding (bass), Kevin Miller (tenor), Eric Shilling (baritone) and James Walker (harpsichord and piano). There was no scenery and the cast wore modern evening clothes.

Within a year of the premiere several other members of the RSC took part in further performances of The Hollow Crown, including Ashcroft, Tony Church, Marius Goring, Geraldine McEwan and Vanessa Redgrave. During 1962 the RSC presented the piece in Amsterdam and Paris, after which the production toured major North American cities. Well into the twenty-first century the show continued to be revived and featured many well-known performers, including Susan Fleetwood, Michael Gough, Alan Howard, Michael Jayston, Barbara Jefford, Michael Redgrave, Ian Richardson, Prunella Scales, Donald Sinden, Janet Suzman, Richard Todd and Harriet Walter. Richardson commented that every member of the RSC "present, past or passed-on" had appeared in the production at one time or another. In 2005 Derek Jacobi and Diana Rigg toured Australia and Canada in the piece, and Howard, Johnson, Sinden and Walter played it at Stratford-upon-Avon.

== Part One ==
For God’s sake, let us sit upon the ground
And tell sad stories of the death of kings –
How some have been deposed, some slain in war,
Some haunted by the ghosts they have deposed,
Some poisoned by their wives, some sleeping killed,
All murdered. For within the hollow crown
That rounds the mortal temples of a king
Keeps Death his court ...

— Richard II, Act III scene ii

=== Kings According to Legend and the Chroniclers ===
- Prologue – "The Hollow Crown" – from Richard II, Act III, scene ii.
- The Death of Kings (from John Stow and the Anglo-Saxon Chronicle): William I, William II, Henry I, Stephen.
- Worlde's Bliss – 12th Century Song (bass).
- An Anonymous Ballad concerning Henry II and Queen Eleanor – "Queen Elanor's Confession" from the Child Ballads.
- 16th and 17th Century Chroniclers (Raphael Holinshed, Edward Hall, Richard Baker and Winston Churchill) on Henry II, Richard I, John, Henry III, Edward I and Edward II.
- Ballade by Richard I made during his captivity in Dürnstein Castle (baritone).
- Richard II surrenders at Flint castle to Henry Tudor (from Froissart's Chronicles, translated by Lord Berners)
- "A Partial, Prejudiced and Ignorant Historian" (Jane Austen, aged fifteen) on Henry IV, Henry V, Henry VI, Edward IV, Edward V, Richard III, Henry VII, Henry VIII, Edward VI, Mary, Elizabeth I, James I and Charles I.

=== The Monarchs Speak for Themselves ===
- Henry V – Agincourt Song (tenor, baritone and bass).
- Drama: Edward III writes a love-letter to the Countess of Salisbury (from Edward III, conjecturally by William Shakespeare among others).
- "The Queen's Command" – Orlando Gibbons (harpsichord).
- Diplomacy: Henry VII sends a secret memorandum to his Ambassadors concerning a proposed marriage between himself and the Queen of Naples, and they reply to it.
- A Speech: Mary denounces the rebellion of Sir Thomas Wyatt, raised in protest against her proposed marriage to Philip II of Spain.
- Henry VIII – "The King's Hunt" (tenor, baritone and bass).
- Letters:

- Henry VIII proposes to Anne Boleyn, a lady in waiting at his court.
- Anne Boleyn writes to Henry from the Tower before her execution.

- Song by Anne Boleyn' s brother "Oh, Death, rock her asleep" (tenor).
- Poems:

- Henry VI – "Kingdoms are but cares".
- Henry VIII – "As the Holly groweth green".
- Elizabeth complains of being importuned with love.
- Charles II – "I pass all my hours in a shady old grove".
- Charles II – "Here's a Health unto His Majesty" (tenor, baritone and bass).

== Part Two ==
=== The Stuarts ===
A custom loathsome to the eye, hateful to the nose, harmful to the brain, dangerous to the lungs, and in the black stinking fume thereof, nearest resembling the horrible Stygian smoke of the pit that is bottomless.

— James I: A Counterblast to Tobacco
- James I blows a Counterblast to Tobacco.
- Charles I confronts John Bradshaw, president of the court, at his trial for high treason and is condemned to death.
- Ayre by Charles I (tenor).
- Charles II:

- marries Catharine of Braganza (from a speech to Parliament and two letters to the Lord Chancellor).
- is anatomised by the Marquess of Halifax, one of his ministers.

- The Vicar of Bray upholds the Protestant Succession.

This grave scene was fully contrasted by the burlesque Duke of Newcastle. He fell into a fit of crying the moment he came into the chapel, and flung himself back in a stall, the Archbishop hovering over him with a smelling-bottle; but in two minutes his curiosity got the better of his hypocrisy, and he ran about the chapel with his glass to spy who was or was not there, spying with one hand, and mopping his eyes with the other.

— Horace Walpole, on the funeral of George II

=== The Illustrious House of Hanover ===
- Queen Caroline – The death of George II's wife – Lord Hervey.
- George II is buried in Westminster Abbey – Horace Walpole.
- George III discusses the Arts with the novelist and diarist Fanny Burney.
- George IV is unswathed and interpreted – William Thackeray.
- The Regency – The madness of George III – Marianne Thornton to E. M. Forster.
- William IV makes a good start – Charles Greville.

=== The Victorian Age ===
- "A Ballad to an Absent Friend" by Albert, Prince Consort (with words by his brother, Ernest).
- Queen Victoria describes her coronation at the age of nineteen (from her private journal).

Yet some men say in many parts of England that King Arthur is not dead ... that there is written upon his tomb this verse: HIC JACET ARTHURUS REX, QUONDAM REX QUE FUTURUS – The Once and Future King.

— Malory, Le Morte d'Arthur
- Variations on "God Save the King" – Beethoven (harpsichord)

== Epilogue ==
From the Morte D'Arthur by Sir Thomas Malory.

== Recordings ==
In 1962 Argo, a label in the Decca group, published a two-record set of The Hollow Crown, featuring Adrian, Barton, Johnson and Tutin, with the addition of Tony Church as narrator. A 1964 film of the RSC production was made by CBS Television and commercially released. The cast comprised Adrian, Barton, Hardwick and Tutin.

== Sources ==
- Barton, John (1962). The Hollow Crown. London: Samuel French. OCLC 1035595525.
- Gaye, Freda, ed. (1967). Who's Who in the Theatre (fourteenth ed.). London: Sir Isaac Pitman and Sons. OCLC 5997224.
- Herbert, Ian, ed. (1977). Who's Who in the Theatre (sixteenth ed.). London and Detroit: Pitman Publishing and Gale Research. ISBN 978-0-273-00163-8.
