= Something Good (Richard Rodgers song) =

Song with lyrics by Richard Rodgers

Song by Julie Andrews and Bill Lee

from the album The Sound of Music
- Published: 1965
- Length: 3:07
- Label: Sony Music Entertainment; RCA/Legacy
- Songwriter: Richard Rodgers

"Something Good" is a song written by Richard Rodgers for the 1965 film version of the 1959 stage musical The Sound of Music. It replaced the original song sung by Maria and Captain Georg von Trapp called "An Ordinary Couple". Since then the song has been used in the various reproductions of the play and most recently the 2015 television special, The Sound of Music Live.

== Background ==
It was first recorded by Julie Andrews and playback singer Bill Lee (dubbing over the voice of actor Christopher Plummer) for the film's soundtrack. In The Making of The Sound of Music by Max Wilk, Wilk stated that when Robert Wise and Saul Chaplin discussed replacing "An Ordinary Couple" with Rodgers, he automatically agreed to the idea and admitted he and lyricist Oscar Hammerstein II had been talking of replacing the song but Hammerstein had been too ill to do so. This was not the only song to be written for the film: another song, "I Have Confidence", was also added. Owing to the popularity of these songs in the film, both have sometimes been integrated into stage productions, with "Something Good" often replacing "An Ordinary Couple".

== Themes ==
The song is a confession of love between Maria Kutschera and Captain Georg von Trapp. It appears in the film shortly after Maria returns to the house and after the Captain and Baroness Schräder have their falling out. A 2004 article of American Music said that the song could be interpreted on two levels. The magazine asserted that on a literal level, it is a song about redemption between Maria's past (and the real woman's difficult childhood and suspicion of the Church) contrasted with the Captain's "loving response to her." However, the article continued that the song covertly provides a "rationale for America's response to Salzburg" in the wake of Nazism—that Europe essentially had a good heart.

== Legacy ==
As with the film, the song is used in 2013 production of The Sound of Music Live! as a confession of love between Maria (played by Carrie Underwood) and the Captain (played by Stephen Moyer) shortly after the falling out between the Captain and Baroness Schräder. It comes right after the musical number with the Captain, Baroness Schräder and Max Detweiler, "No Way to Stop It", in the broadcast. In a review of the production, Entertainment Weekly considered the song "boring" stating "This snoozefest is the musical representation of why some people say they can’t sit through Sound of Music, and that the song "is actually, well, bad." Prior to the production's live broadcast, Underwood and Moyer recorded a studio recording for the production's soundtrack.

The song was used by Elaine Stritch to close Elaine Stritch at Liberty, her one-woman, Tony Award-winning 2002 Broadway show.
