= How Do You Solve a Problem Like Maria? (Canadian TV series) =

- How Do You Solve a Problem Like Maria? (CBC)
- Genre: Reality competition
- Created by: Andrew Lloyd Webber
- Starring: Gavin Crawford (Host)> Simon Lee (Judge); Elaine Overholt (Judge); John Barrowman (Judge)
- Country of origin: Canada
- Original language: English
- No. of seasons: 1
- No. of episodes: 6

Production
- Producer: Temple Street Productions

Original release
- Network: CBC Television
- Release: June 15 – July 28, 2008

How Do You Solve a Problem Like Maria? is a 2008 Canadian reality competition television series derived from a 2006 series of the same name broadcast on BBC One in the United Kingdom. The Canadian version aired on CBC Television between June 15, 2008, and July 28, 2008.

The premise of the contest was to find a musical theatre performer to play the lead role of Maria von Trapp in the 2008 Andrew Lloyd Webber and David Mirvish revival of Rodgers and Hammerstein's The Sound of Music at the Princess of Wales Theatre in Toronto. Initial auditions were held in seven Canadian cities. The show was hosted by Gavin Crawford and featured Simon Lee, Elaine Overholt, and John Barrowman as the judges for the show.

The first episode of the show featured the top 50 auditioners at the show's Maria School being cut to 20. The second episode had the Marias performing in front of Andrew in London, and then the 20 were cut to 10 with his input. Beginning June 22, the Marias performed live in Toronto every Sunday night with a live orchestra. The voting results aired on the following night.

== Finalists ==
Ten contestants made it through the audition rounds and performed during the live shows.

Finalist	Age*	From	Apron Color	Status
Alison Jutzi	29	Guelph, Ontario	Burgundy	Eliminated 1st in Week 1
Allie Hughes	22	Toronto, Ontario	Dark Blue	Eliminated 2nd in Week 2
Katie Kerr	19	Windsor, Ontario	Baby Pink	Eliminated 3rd in Week 3
Kyla Tingley	24	Dartmouth, Nova Scotia	Hot Pink	Eliminated 4th in Week 3
Donna Lajeunesse	22	Bowmanville, Ontario	Orange	Eliminated 5th in Week 4
Tamara Fifield	21	Truro, Nova Scotia	Sky Blue	Eliminated 6th in Week 4
Marisa McIntyre	21	Waterloo, Ontario	Dark Green	Eliminated 7th in Week 5
Jayme Armstrong	24	Richmond, Ontario	Red	Third place
Janna Polzin	24	Woodstock, Ontario	Lime Green	Second place
Elicia MacKenzie	23	Surrey, British Columbia	Purple	Winner

* at the start of the contest

=== Results summary ===
Place	Contestant	Week 1	Week 2	Week 3	Week 4	Week 5	Final
1	Elicia	Safe	Safe	Safe	Bottom 3	Safe	Winner
2	Janna	Safe	Safe	Safe	Safe	Safe	Runner-up
3	Jayme	Safe	Bottom 2	Safe	Safe	Bottom 2	Third Place
4	Marisa	Bottom 2	Safe	Safe	Safe	Eliminated	Eliminated
5	Tamara	Safe	Safe	Bottom 3	Eliminated	Eliminated	
6	Donna	Safe	Safe	Safe	Eliminated	Eliminated	
7	Kyla	Safe	Safe	Eliminated	Eliminated		
8	Katie	Safe	Safe	Eliminated	Eliminated		
9	Allie	Safe	Eliminated	Eliminated			
10	Alison	Eliminated	Eliminated				

== Live shows ==
The live shows saw the finalists eliminated one by one (or two) following both individual and group performances. Once eliminated, the leaving contestant(s) ended the program by leading a performance of "So Long, Farewell" from The Sound of Music with the remaining contestants.

=== Week 1 (June 22, 2008) ===
Following the first week of the competition, Alison was the first Maria to be eliminated from the competition. The show performances were:

- Group performances:
  - "How Do You Solve A Problem Like Maria?" (from the musical The Sound of Music)
  - "I Have Confidence" (from the musical The Sound of Music)

Contestants' performances on the first live show
Contestant	Performance Pair	Order	Song	Result
Allie Hughes	Pair 1	1	"It's Oh So Quiet"	Safe
Kyla Tingley	Pair 1	2	"Torn"	Safe
Elicia MacKenzie	Pair 2	3	"Color My World"	Safe
Donna Lajeunesse	Pair 2	4	"I Am Changing"	Safe
Tamara Fifield	Pair 3	5	"Over the Rainbow"	Safe
Jayme Armstrong	Pair 3	6	"Son of a Preacher Man"	Safe
Marisa McIntyre	Pair 4	7	"Jolene"	Bottom 2
Katie Kerr	Pair 4	8	"Girls Just Want to Have Fun"	Safe
Janna Polzin	Pair 5	9	"My Baby Just Cares for Me"	Safe
Alison Jutzi	Pair 5	10	"I'm Every Woman"	Bottom 2

Sing-Off

Act	Sing Off Song	Results
Marisa McIntyre	"Take That Look Off Your Face" from Tell Me on a Sunday	Saved by Simon
Alison Jutzi	"Take That Look Off Your Face" from Tell Me on a Sunday	Eliminated

=== Week 2 (June 29, 2008) ===
For the mission this week, the potential Marias had to prove how fit they are by taking part in a workout.

For their individual performances, the contestants sang songs by Canadian artists to celebrate Canada Day.

The show performances were:

- Group performances:
  - "My Favorite Things" (from the musical The Sound of Music)
  - "Ain't No Mountain High Enough" (Marvin Gaye & Tammi Terrell)

Contestants' performances on the second live show
Contestant	Performance Pair	Order	Song	Result
Donna Lajeunesse	Pair 1	1	"Something to Talk About"	Safe
Jayme Armstrong	Pair 1	2	"Constant Craving"	Bottom 2
Marisa McIntyre	Solo Performance	3	"Seven Day Fool"	Safe
Elicia MacKenzie	Pair 2	4	"Black Velvet"	Safe
Tamara Fifield	Pair 2	5	"Complicated"	Safe
Allie Hughes	Pair 3	6	"I Will Remember You"	Bottom 2
Janna Polzin	Pair 3	7	"Turn Off the Light"	Safe
Katie Kerr	Pair 4	8	"Insensitive"	Safe
Kyla Tingley	Pair 4	9	"Dance Me to the End of Love"	Safe

Sing-Off

Act	Sing Off Song	Results
Jayme Armstrong	"Another Suitcase in Another Hall" from Evita	Saved by Simon
Allie Hughes	"Another Suitcase in Another Hall" from Evita	Eliminated

=== Week 3 (July 6, 2008) ===
For their individual performances, the contestants sang songs from the musicals.

The show performances were:

- Group performances:
  - "Do-Re-Mi" (from the musical The Sound of Music)
  - "Seasons of Love" (from the musical Rent)

Contestants' performances on the third live show
Contestant	Performance Pair	Order	Song	Result
Katie Kerr	Pair 1	1	"Easy to Be Proud"	Bottom 3
Elicia MacKenzie	Pair 1	2	"Cabaret"	Safe
Marisa McIntyre	Pair 2	3	"If I Were a Bell"	Safe
Janna Polzin	Pair 2	4	"Defying Gravity"	Safe
Tamara Fifield	Pair 3	5	"You Must Love Me"	Bottom 3
Jayme Armstrong	Pair 3	6	"Diamonds Are a Girl's Best Friend"	Safe
Kyla Tingley	Pair 4	7	"All That Jazz"	Bottom 3
Donna Lajeunesse	Pair 4	8	"Out of My Dreams"	Safe

Sing-Off

Act	Sing Off Song	Results
Katie Kerr	"Superstar" from Jesus Christ Superstar	Eliminated
Tamara Fifield	"Superstar" from Jesus Christ Superstar	Saved by Simon
Kyla Tingley	"Superstar" from Jesus Christ Superstar	Eliminated

=== Week 4 (July 13, 2008) ===
As the mission for this week, the contestants act with the children to help separate between the potential Marias.

The show performances were:

- Group performances:
  - "The Lonely Goatherd" (from the musical The Sound of Music)
  - "Don't Rain on My Parade" (from the musical Funny Girl)

Contestants' performances on the fourth live show
Contestant	Performance Pair	Order	Song	Result
Elicia MacKenzie	Pair 1	1	"Shout"	Bottom 3
Donna Lajeunesse	Pair 1	2	"Bang Bang (My Baby Shot Me Down)"	Bottom 3
Janna Polzin	Pair 2	3	"California Dreamin'"	Safe
Jayme Armstrong	Pair 2	4	"You Don't Have to Say You Love Me"	Safe
Tamara Fifield	Pair 3	5	"You Don't Own Me"	Bottom 3
Marisa McIntyre	Pair 3	6	"Downtown"	Safe

Sing-Off

Act	Sing Off Song	Results
Elicia MacKenzie	"Tell Me on a Sunday" from Tell Me on a Sunday	Saved by Simon
Donna Lajeunesse	"Tell Me on a Sunday" from Tell Me on a Sunday	Eliminated
Tamara Fifield	"Tell Me on a Sunday" from Tell Me on a Sunday	Eliminated

=== Week 5 (July 20, 2008) ===
This week, just like the British version, the mission was a chemistry test with John Barrowman, which involved his giving the Marias a surprise kiss.

The show performances were:

- Group performances:
  - "I Have Confidence" (from the musical The Sound of Music)
  - "It's a Grand Night for Singing" (from the musical State Fair)
  - "Sway" (The Pussycat Dolls)

Contestants' performances on the fifth live show
Contestant	Order	Song	Result
Janna Polzin	1	"Anyone Who Had a Heart"	Safe
Elicia MacKenzie	2	"You Needed Me"	Safe
Jayme Armstrong	3	"I Say a Little Prayer"	Bottom 2
Marisa McIntyre	4	"River Deep Mountain High"	Bottom 2

Sing-Off

Act	Sing Off Song	Results
Jayme Armstrong	"As If We Never Said Goodbye" from Sunset Boulevard	Saved by Andrew
Marisa McIntyre	"As If We Never Said Goodbye" from Sunset Boulevard	Eliminated

=== Week 6 (July 27, 2008) ===
For their individual performances, the contestants sang songs by Andrew Lloyd Webber.

The show performances were:

- Group performances:
  - Finalists: "Anything You Can Do" (from the musical Annie Get Your Gun)
  - Finalists: "My Favorite Things" (from the musical The Sound of Music)
  - Finalists and former Marias: "How Do You Solve A Problem Like Maria?" (from the musical The Sound of Music)
  - Elicia and Janna: "The Sound of Music" (from The Sound of Music)

Contestants' performances on the sixth live show
Contestant	Order	Andrew Lloyd Webber song	Order	Song of the Season	Result
Jayme Armstrong	1	"I Don't Know How to Love Him"	N/A	N/A (already eliminated)	Eliminated
Janna Polzin	2	"Don't Cry for Me Argentina"	4	"Defying Gravity"	Runner-up
Elicia MacKenzie	3	"Memory"	5	"Cabaret"	Winner

- After being announced as the season winner, Elicia concluded the season with a performance of "The Sound of Music".

== After the show ==
Elicia MacKenzie won the most votes, as announced prematurely on the Canadian Press wire at 7:30pm, July 28, half an hour before the show aired in the Toronto area.

On August 14, 2008, it was announced that runner-up, Janna Polzin, had been cast as an "alternate Maria" for the Toronto stage production. Janna played Maria twice a week (Wednesday evenings and Saturday matinees), while Elicia will perform the role six times weekly (Tuesday evenings, Wednesday matinees, Thursday through Saturday evenings and Sunday matinees).

Some viewers of the show have claimed that the panel and Andrew favoured Janna over the other performers in the competition. However, Elicia ended up beating Janna in the final.
