= Bill Terry (disambiguation) =

Bill Terry (1898–1989) was a Major League Baseball player and manager.

Bill Terry may also refer to:

- Bill Terry (wrestler) (1942–1999), Canadian professional wrestler
- Bill Terry (NASCAR owner), NASCAR car owner from the early 1980s
- Bill Terry (author), author of Blue Heaven: Encounters with the Blue Poppy
- Bill Terry (ice hockey) (born 1961), ice hockey player

== See also ==
- William Terry (disambiguation)
