= The Sound of Music (soundtrack) =

1965 soundtrack album by Rodgers and Hammerstein

Soundtrack album by Rodgers and Hammerstein, Julie Andrews
- Released: March 2, 1965
- Genre: Show tune
- Length: 44:28
- Label: RCA Victor
- Producer: Neely Plumb

Julie Andrews chronology
Mary Poppins (1964)	The Sound of Music (1965)	Thoroughly Modern Millie (1967)

The soundtrack of the film The Sound of Music, music and lyrics by Rodgers and Hammerstein, was released in 1965 by RCA Victor and is one of the most successful soundtrack albums in history, having sold more than 20 million copies worldwide. The soundtrack has been issued in German, Italian, Spanish and French.

The soundtrack spent two weeks in the number one position on the Billboard 200 in 1965 and remained in the top ten for 109 weeks, from May 1, 1965 to July 16, 1967, the most of any soundtrack in the chart's history. It remained on the Billboard 200 for a total of 238 weeks. In 2015, Billboard named the original soundtrack album the second-best charting album of all time. It was the best-selling album in the United Kingdom in 1965, 1966 and 1968 and the second-best-selling of the decade, spending a total of 70 weeks at number one on the UK Albums Chart. The album also stayed for 73 weeks on the Norwegian charts, and as of December 2017 it is the tenth-best-charting album of all time in that country.

RCA first reissued the soundtrack album on compact disc in 1985; the album has been reissued several times subsequently, including anniversary editions in 1995, 2000, 2005, 2010 and 2015, and in 2023 as a 5-disc Super Deluxe Edition. These CD editions incorporate musical material from the film that would not fit on the original LP, with the 2023 release presenting the score in its entirety and including 40 unreleased tracks, such as alternate takes and other material removed from the final film version.

Three songs from the original Broadway production, "An Ordinary Couple", "How Can Love Survive?", and "No Way to Stop It" were replaced, in the film, with two new songs, "I Have Confidence" and "Something Good". For the original Broadway show, the music was written by Richard Rodgers with lyrics by Oscar Hammerstein II; both the lyrics and music for the new songs were written by Rodgers, as Hammerstein had died in 1960. All songs were arranged and conducted for the soundtrack by Irwin Kostal.

In 2018, the soundtrack was selected for preservation in the National Recording Registry by the Library of Congress as being "culturally, historically, or aesthetically significant".

== Reception ==
The Sound of Music soundtrack sold 500,000 copies in its first two weeks in the United States. Elsewhere, the album achieved large sales in the UK, Japan, Canada and Australia, becoming one of the best selling records of the 1960s. It became the first album to sell over 10,000 units in Finland. The record peaked at number one in Australia, the UK and the US.

== Track listing ==
All music written by Richard Rodgers, lyrics by Oscar Hammerstein II (except "I Have Confidence" and "Something Good", both lyrics by Rodgers), and arranged and conducted by Irwin Kostal. Track lengths are per the liner notes to the original US release.

Side one
No.	Title	Performer(s)	Length
1.	"Prelude" / "The Sound of Music"	Julie Andrews	2:33
2.	"Overture and Preludium"	Orchestra and Nuns Chorus	3:12
3.	"Morning Hymn and Alleluia"	Nuns Chorus	2:00
4.	"Maria"	Nuns Chorus	3:15
5.	"I Have Confidence"	Andrews	3:21
6.	"Sixteen Going on Seventeen"	Daniel Truhitte and Charmian Carr	3:13
7.	"My Favorite Things"	Andrews	2:16
8.	"Climb Ev'ry Mountain"	Peggy Wood	2:13
Total length:			22:03

Side two
No.	Title	Performer(s)	Length
1.	"The Lonely Goatherd"	Andrews and the Children	3:08
2.	"The Sound of Music (Reprise)"	The Children and Bill Lee	2:09
3.	"Do-Re-Mi"	Andrews and the Children	5:30
4.	"Something Good"	Andrews and Lee	3:15
5.	"Processional and Maria (Reprise)"	Organ, Orchestra and Nuns Chorus	2:25
6.	"Edelweiss"	Lee, Andrews, the Children and Chorus	1:48
7.	"So Long, Farewell"	The Children	2:52
8.	"Climb Ev'ry Mountain (Reprise)"	Chorus and Orchestra	1:18
Total length:			22:25

== Charts ==
=== Weekly charts ===
Chart (1965–68)	Peak position
Australian Albums (Kent Music Report)	1
Canadian Albums (RPM)	3
Denmark Albums (Cash Box)	1
Dutch Albums (Album Top 100)	36
Norwegian Albums (VG-lista)	1
UK Albums (Official Charts)	1
US Billboard 200	1

=== Year-end charts ===
Chart (1965)	Rank
UK Albums (OCC)	1
US Billboard 200	3
Chart (1966)	Rank
UK Albums (OCC)	1
US Billboard 200	2
Chart (1967)	Rank
UK Albums (OCC)	2
US Billboard 200	4
Chart (1968)	Rank
UK Albums (OCC)	1
Chart (1969)	Rank
UK Albums (OCC)	6

=== Decade-end charts ===
Chart (1960–69)	Rank
UK Albums (OCC)	2

== Certifications and sales ==
Region	Certification	Certified units/sales
Argentina	—	40,000
Australia (ARIA)	Gold	
Canada (Music Canada)	5× Platinum	1,000,000
Finland	—	11,000
Israel	—	45,000
Netherlands	—	50,000
New Zealand	—	100,000
Norway (IFPI Norway)	Gold	50,000
South Africa (RISA)	Gold	200,000
United Kingdom (BPI)	8× Platinum	2,438,695
United States (RIAA)	Gold	6,887,311
Summaries
Worldwide	—	20,000,000

== Sources ==
- Hischak, Thomas. The Rodgers and Hammerstein Encyclopedia (2007). Greenwood Publishing Group. ISBN 0-313-34140-0
