= Lauri Peters =

American actress

- Born: July 1943 (age 82)
- Occupations: Actress; dancer; singer
- Years active: 1959–1973
- Spouse: Jon Voight (m. 1962; div. 1967)

Lauri Peters (born July 1943, also known as Patti Peterson) is an American actress and dancer in theatre, film, and television.

== Early life ==
Lauri Peters was born to Mr. and Mrs. Harold Peterson. She has three older brothers, Harold Jr., Victor, and Sidney. The Peterson family moved to Cleveland, Ohio when Peters was a year old. Having studied dance from a young age, Peters moved to New York City as a teenager to pursue ballet. She was known as Patti Peterson.

== Career ==
Peters made her Broadway debut in 1958 as a replacement in the children's ensemble in Say, Darling. She was credited as Laurie Peterson (there was already a Patti Peterson registered with Actors Equity). Say, Darling closed in January 1959, and two months later she opened in her second Broadway show, First Impressions, this time billed as Lauri Peters. In the fall of 1959, Peters created the role of Liesl Von Trapp in the original Broadway production of The Sound of Music. She received a Tony Award nomination for Best Featured Actress in a Musical, which she shared with her sibling castmates. She was married to actor Jon Voight (1962–67), whom she met when he joined the cast as Nazi messenger boy Rolfe, with whom Liesl shares a song ("Sixteen Going on Seventeen") and an attraction. She can be heard on the show's cast album, which has sold more than three million copies in the US.

In Britain, she is probably best known as Cliff Richard's romantic lead in the 1963 film Summer Holiday. On film, she also acted alongside Fabian, James Stewart, and Sidney Poitier.

She appeared as Moll in the 1964 off-Broadway revival of Marc Blitzstein's The Cradle Will Rock directed by Howard Da Silva.

Although she worked primarily in the theater, on and off Broadway, and in touring companies, she also appeared on popular television shows of the 1960s and '70s, including Gunsmoke, where she was featured as "Allie", an innocent girl stuck in a poor family of eight (with a father and brother who were future-less lazy, whiners), yet she somehow remained kind and caring, as well as falling hard for her heartthrob, Marshal Dillon in the episode "Take Her, She's Cheap" (S10E6).

That was after her first starring role on Gunsmoke in 1964 (S9E20) as the title character "Mayblossom", portraying Festus's cousin (who was promised to him for marriage), but who also falls prey to being violated by a townsman.

With acting teacher Sanford Meisner, Peters founded the Meisner Extension at New York University in 1993, where she was artistic director and master teacher. Teaching the technique away from Manhattan, she has written a book on Meisner.

== Theatre ==
- 1958 Say, Darling as Kid in the Show (replacement)
- 1959 First Impressions as Kitty Bennet
- 1959 The Sound of Music as Liesl Von Trapp
- 1964 A Murderer Among Us as Louisette
- 1964 The Cradle Will Rock as Moll
- 1968 The House of Atreus as Handmaiden, Chorus, and Singer

== Filmography ==
Year	Title	Role	Notes
1961	Camera Three		Season 6 Episode 40: "Evocations of Love"
1962	Mr. Hobbs Takes a Vacation	Katey Hobbs	
1963	Summer Holiday	Barbara	
1963	The Nurses	Lauri Perrault	Season 1 Episode 28: "Choice Among Wrongs"
1964	Gunsmoke	Mayblossom / Allie	2 episodes
1967	The Road West	Sarah	Season 1 Episode 15: "Reap the Whirlwind"
1968	For Love of Ivy	Gena Austin	
1972	Ghost Story	Mariah Hollis	Season 1 Episode 9: "Cry of the Cat"
1973	Search	Trudi Hauser	Season 1 Episode 15: "Numbered for Death"
1973	The Delphi Bureau	Jackdaw	Season 1 Episode 5: "The Terror Broker Project"
