= Lana Roi =

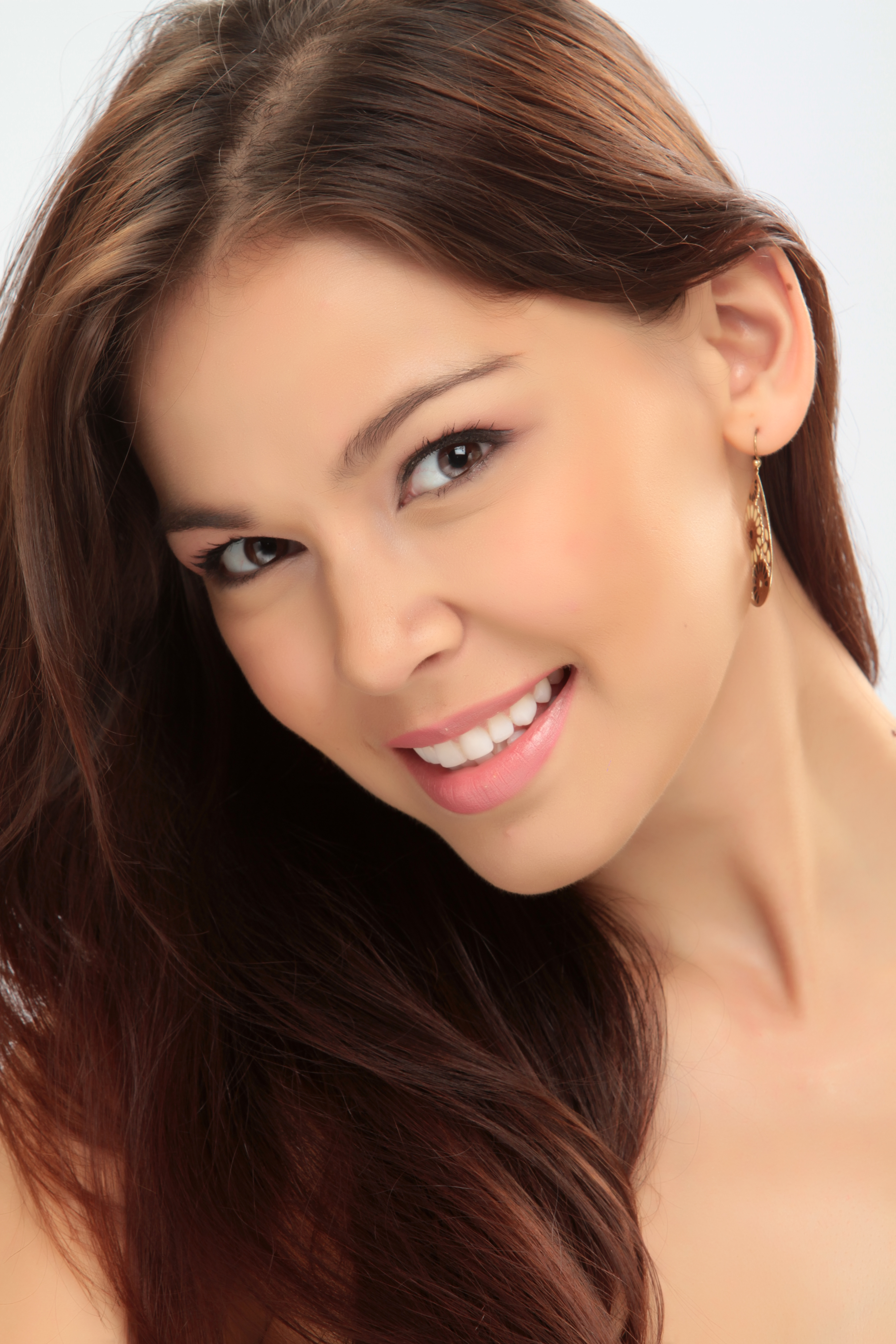

Background information
- Born: Theresa Marie Masi Fenger; September 22, 1987 (age 39); Canada
- Genre: Pop
- Occupations: Singer, songwriter, model, host
- Years active: 1999–present

Theresa Marie Masi Fenger (born September 22, 1987), better known by her stage name Lana Roi, is a Canadian recording artist, songwriter, former beauty title holder, and commercial model. She is a former lead singer of the girl group EURASIA.

== Early life ==
Theresa Marie Masi Fenger was born in Halifax, Nova Scotia, of Filipino and German descent. From 1999 to 2001, she underwent vocal training for classical music and completed vocal coaching in Vancouver, Nashville, Philippines and Singapore. She studied film and television, and acting in at Caledonia Secondary School. She earned a Bachelor of Music from Capilano University in 2007.

== Career ==
Fenger won her first singing talent award in 1999, at the age of 12, in the "Most Outstanding Performer-Junior Category". She won a number of vocal and performance contests in British Columbia, Canada, and recorded her first original pop at Canadian Idol.

In 2004, she won Miss Global Teen Canada and went to represent her country in Calgary and again in Guatemala, where she won Miss Teen Mayan World, against all North America and Central America.

Fenger was one of the finalists of the MYX VJ Search 2009. After the search, she signed with Viva Entertainment and became lead vocalist for the girl group Eurasia which toured around Europe and Asia and opened for International artist, Neyo in Manila. Recorded their debut album in 2010 with their single "Working Girls" for the movie of the same title. She also won Century Tuna Superbods Challenge in 2009, becoming their endorser for almost two years. She is also the face of Gatorade Low Carb drink in the Philippines.

In November 2012, she opened for Jennifer Lopez's "Dance Again World Tour" singing her original song "Minamina" which she also performed on ASB-CBN's ASAP show. She continued guesting on noontime shows and had cameo acting roles as well on Philippine TV. Fenger went back into songwriting and released her album INNER BASE under PolyEast Records with her carrier single "It's Time". She won "Outstanding Female International Performer and Songwriter" at the 35th People's Choice Awards 2015 and also "Asia's Total Performing Diva" at the 26th Asia Pacific Awards 2015.
