= William Terry =

William Terry may refer to:

== Politicians ==
- William Terry (MP for Kingston upon Hull), for Kingston upon Hull (UK Parliament constituency)
- William Terry (MP for Arundel) for Arundel (UK Parliament constituency)
- William Terry (Upper Canada politician) (1798–), political figure in Upper Canada
- William Terry (Virginia politician) (1824–1888), member of the United States Congress from Virginia and Confederate general
- William L. Terry (1850-1917), U.S. Representative from Arkansas, father of David Dickson Terry

== Others ==
- Bill Terry (1898–1989) National League baseball player
- William Richard Terry (1827-1897), Confederate general
- William Terry (actor) (1914–1962), an American actor
- William Terry, a pseudonym of British author Terry Harknett

== See also ==
- Bill Terry (disambiguation)
