= Sophie Bould =

British actress (born 1982)

- Born: 1982 (age 43–44); Shropshire, England, UK
- Occupation: Actress
- Works: Filmography Theatricalia

Sophie Bould is a British theatre and TV actress from Shropshire, where she attended Thomas Telford School and St Dominic's High School for Girls in Brewood.

Her first stage appearance was in South Pacific, at age eight with the South Staffs Musical Theatre Company at the Grand Theatre in Wolverhampton..Bould graduated with a first class degree from Mountview Academy of Theatre Arts, having earlier attended the National Youth Theatre.

Her film roles include short film Waving in 2022 starring Ralph Ineson. Her television appearances include Nolly, Sex Education, Doctors, The Inspector Lynley Mysteries and Holby City.

Bould appeared in the West End at the London Palladium in the original Andrew Lloyd Webber production of The Sound of Music, alongside Connie Fisher. Bould played the eldest child of the Von Trapp family, "Liesl". She was also the understudy for "Maria" and received rave reviews in that role, having stepped in to cover an extended absence by Fisher through illness. Bould left The Sound of Music on 24 September 2007.

Bould's stage debut was as the lead in the Rodgers and Hammerstein version of Cinderella, at the Bristol Old Vic, in 2003. Bould went on to appear in other productions including Coram Boy at the National Theatre in South Bank.

In 2008 she starred in the UK tour of Noises Off and later that year as "Belle" at the Birmingham Repertory Theatre in A Christmas Carol until January 2010.

During the summer of 2010, Bould joined the companies of Sheridan's The Critic and Tom Stoppard's The Real Inspector Hound at Chichester Festival Theatre. She also took the leading role of "Lily" in The Secret Garden at Edinburgh Festival Theatre, "which opened to rave reviews in Edinburgh" and at the Royal Alexandra Theatre, Toronto, Canada.

She married Robin Savage in Shropshire in September 2010.

Bould starred as "Tracy Lord" in a UK tour of High Society in early 2013.

In 2026 she appeared as Elizabeth Harte, mother of Emma Harte, in the Channel 4 remake of "A Woman of Substance".
