= Kristian Yli-Hietanen =

Finnish footballer (born 1996)

Personal information
- Full name: Kristian Aleksi Yli-Hietanen
- Date of birth: 31 May 1996 (age 30)
- Place of birth: Tampere, Finland
- Height: 1.86 m (6 ft 1 in)
- Position: Forward

Youth career
- Ilves
- North Vancouver FC

College career
Years	Team	Apps	(Gls)
2015–2016	Capilano Blues	26	(15)
2017–2018	UBC Thunderbirds	32	(14)

Senior career*
Years	Team	Apps	(Gls)
2017	TSS Rovers	10	(2)
2019	TSS Rovers	7	(1)
2020	TPV	8	(3)
2021	Lahti	21	(1)
2021	→ Reipas Lahti	2	(0)
2022	KäPa	22	(16)
2023	Haka	7	(0)
2023	KäPa	13	(10)
2024	Gnistan	1	(0)
- * Club domestic league appearances and goals as of 1 September 2024

Kristian Yli-Hietanen (born 31 May 1996) is a Finnish professional footballer who plays as a forward. Yli-Hietanen holds a dual Finnish-Canadian citizenship.

== Early life ==
Born in Tampere, Finland, Yli-Hietanen began playing youth soccer with Ilves, In 2007, he moved to North Vancouver, British Columbia in Canada with his family, where he played youth soccer with North Vancouver FC. After graduating high school at Sutherland Secondary School, he was not recruited by any university programs and began working construction as a labourer and a painter.

== University career ==
In 2015, he began attending Capilano University, where he was the 2015 PACWEST Player of the Year and Rookie of the Year, as well as Golden Boot award winner after scoring eight goals in 14 league games. He also helped Capilano win the PACWEST Gold Medal and the national CCAA silver medal and was named a CCAA All-Canadian and CCAA Tournament All-Star. In February 2016, he decided to transfer to Simon Fraser University, however, he ultimately remained with Capilano instead for 2016. In 2016, they repeated as PACWEST Gold medalists and won the CCAA bronze medal.

In 2017, following two successful seasons with the Capilano University men's soccer team, Yli-Hietanen would move on to the University of British Columbia. On September 30, 2018, he scored 4 goals in a game against the University of North British Columbia Timberwolves. While in university, he also played amateur senior soccer with Rino's Tigers in the Vancouver Metro Soccer League from 2017 to 2019.

== Club career ==
In 2017, he played for TSS FC Rovers in the Premier Development League. He would return to TSS FC for the 2019 season, scoring once in seven appearances.

In 2020, he returned to Finland, signing with Tampereen Pallo-Veikot (TPV) of the third tier Kakkonen.

In 2021, Yli-Hietanen approached Reipas Lahti and went on trial with them, where he was recommended to the top tier side FC Lahti, where he signed a contract. He scored his first goal in a 2021 Finnish Cup match against KTP on February 13.

In 2022, he joined KäPa in Kakkonen.

On 9 January 2023, it was announced that Yli-Hietanen had signed a 1+1 year contract with FC Haka in the Veikkauslliga.

On 14 July 2023, Yli-Hietanen rejoined Ykkönen club KäPa on a contract for the rest of the season.

On 15 January 2024, Yli-Hietanen signed with newly promoted Veikkausliiga club IF Gnistan on a one-year deal.

== Career statistics ==
As of 25 June 2024.

Club	Season	League			Cup (Note: Appearances in the Suomen Cup and Finnish League Cup)		Continental		Total	
Club	Season	Division	Apps	Goals	Apps	Goals	Apps	Goals	Apps	Goals
TSS Rovers	2017	PDL	10	2	0	0	–		10	2
TSS Rovers	2019	USL League Two	7	1	0	0	–		7	1
TSS Rovers	Total		17	3	0	0	0	0	7	3
TPV	2020	Kakkonen	8	3	0	0	–		8	3
Lahti	2021	Veikkausliiga	21	1	2	1	–		23	2
Reipas Lahti	2021	Kakkonen	2	0	–		–		2	0
KäPa	2022	Kakkonen	22	16	–		–		22	16
Haka	2023	Veikkausliiga	7	0	1	0	0	0	8	0
KäPa	2023	Ykkönen	13	10	–		–		13	10
Gnistan	2024	Veikkausliiga	1	0	3	2	–		4	2
Career total			91	33	6	3	0	0	97	36
