= Myx VJ Search =

Annual competition held by Myx

The Myx VJ Search is a special competition held annually by Myx, the number one music channel in the Philippines. It gives young people the chance to fulfill their dreams of becoming the next Myx VJ.

Auditions are held at ABS-CBN in Quezon City, usually on four separate dates within the same month. After the auditions, 12 finalists are chosen who then go through a training experience process usually lasting up to two months. The Myx VJ Search is broadcast on Myx and split into 8 episodes, the last episode being the finals night, in which the winners are announced. The winners are chosen by Myx, through the text votes of the viewers and by the Myx team's own selection.

For the Myx VJ Searches 2007, 2008 and 2017, four winners were chosen on the finals night, two males and two females. For the Myx VJ Searches 2009 and 2018 there were only two grand winners, while for the Myx VJ Searches 2010, 2011, 2012, 2014 and 2019, three winners were selected. There was no public search in 2013, 2015 and 2016; only private auditions were held.

The Myx VJ Search began in 2007.

The finalists and winners of past Myx VJ Searches are as follows:

== Myx VJ Search 2007 ==
- Dianne Eclar
- Andrei Felix
- Odessa Fernandez
- Mica Froilan
- Igi Guerrero
- Rocco Nacino
- Jet Singh
- Sanya Smith
- Sandra Soriano
- Atom Ungson

Winners: Drei, Mica, Igi and Sanya.

== Myx VJ Search 2008 ==
- Paolo Alino
- Robi Domingo
- Macky Escalona
- Cerah Hernandez
- Kai Hocson
- Ezra Lacsamana
- JC Lingad
- Chino Lui Pio
- Jessica Mendoza
- Sam Pinto
- Bianca Roque
- Monica Yncierto

Winners: Robi, Chino, Bianca and Monica.

== Myx VJ Search 2009 ==
- Andi Eigenmann
- Theresa Marie Fenger
- Sarah Gaugler
- Nel Gomez
- Miki Hahn
- Kevin Lapeña
- Miko Morente
- Janine Ramirez
- Sam Reynolds (Note: Voluntarily left the competition early due to academic reasons, as he was to begin his first year at University in England.)
- Ant Santos
- Jade Sison
- Toff Tiozon

Winners: Nel and Janine.

== Myx VJ Search 2010 ==
- Ton Vergel de Dios
- Issa Perez de Tagle
- Kat Espe
- Dane Hipolito
- Josh Katigbak
- Marco Mañalac
- Christine Manalaysay
- Robin Nievera
- Kirsten Rice
- Julz Savard
- Andy Smith
- Anj Rosette Uy

Winners: Ton, Robin and Julz.

== Myx VJ Search 2011 ==
- Mike Advincula
- Marga Bermudez
- Chewy Buhion
- Earl Burgos
- Camille Caoile
- Cara Eriguel
- Martin Javier
- JJ Kaufman
- Angelia Ong
- Joyce Pring
- Drew Rivera
- K-La Rivera

Winners: Mike, K-La and Joyce.

== Myx VJ Search 2012 ==
- Kristine Antonio
- Mica Caldito
- Kevin Dineros
- Mike Mariano
- Michelle Ng
- Karen Pacheco
- Anjo Resurreccion
- Hadi Rushdy
- Paulina Sotto
- Marcky Stuart
- Jessica Conelly
- Divine Smith

Winners: Kristine, Mike and Michelle.

== 2013 ==
There was no public search for 2013; instead private auditions were held through coordination with various talent agencies. The winners were chosen directly by the Myx management to coincide with the channel's new look. The VJs selected were Karla Aguas, Sam Concepcion, and Ai Dela Cruz.

== Myx VJ Search 2014 ==
- Marion Aunor
- Luigi Enzo D'Avola
- Hazel Faith Dela Cruz
- Mercedes Espina
- Jose Gabriel La Viña
- Gianna Llanes
- Victor "Vieo" Romeo Lopez
- Eunick Nicole Nobe
- Christian Edgar Reasonda
- Rebecca Sadhwani
- Rafa Siguion-Reyna
- Mark Anthony Thompson

Winners: Luigi, Gianna and Vieo.

== 2015 ==
There was no public search for 2015; instead private auditions were held through coordination with various talent agencies. The winners were chosen directly by the Myx management. The winners were Diego Loyzaga, Tippy Dos Santos and Erica Abello.

== 2016 ==
There was no public search yet again for 2016; instead private auditions were held through coordination with various talent agencies. The winners were chosen directly by the Myx management. The winners were Alex Diaz, Sarah Carlos, Jairus Aquino and Sharlene San Pedro.

A new competition on Myxph.com, the Myx Vlogger Search, unveiled its winner at the Myx Music Awards 2016. Sunshine Kim won and later became a Myx VJ with Donny Pangilinan.

== Myx VJ Search 2017 ==
- Juan Alfonso Avila
- Kimberly "Kim" Ann Cruz
- Arturo "Turs" Daza
- Martin David Javier
- Mary Angelique Manto
- Michelle Anne Naldo
- Nicholas Olaes
- Dan Aberiel Pojas
- Dale Rossly
- J.C. Tevez
- Debbie Then
- Michaela Villanueva

Winners: J.C., Debbie, Kim and Turs.

== Myx VJ Search 2018 ==
- Samm Alvero
- Gelo Buencamino
- Kyler Carbonell
- Sean Dandasan
- Kat De Guzman
- Gelo Gabriel
- Aiyana Perlas
- Sky Quizon
- Kaye Reyes
- Gari Rivera
- Ethan Salvador
- Nia

Winners: Samm and Kaye.

== Myx VJ Search 2019 ==
- Hans Braga
- Cholo Dela Cruz
- Anton Fausto
- Aya Fernandez
- Gio Kawachi
- Mac Lofgren
- Eryka Lucas
- Mika Madrid
- Dani Mortel
- EJ Nacion
- Bea Rodriguez
- Denise Silva

Winners: Anton, Dani and Aya.

== Myx VJ Search 2024 ==
- Ameera "Eya" Almamari
- Earl Taruc
- Elise Cruz
- Ella Regudo
- Jarren Garcia
- Kaira Mack
- Kring Prologo
- Migs Venegas
- Ozzie Llige
- Sela Guia
- Yani Lopez
- Zach Castaneda

Winners: Jarren and Kring.

Runners-up: Eya, Ella, and Ozzie.
