= For Love of Ivy =

1968 film by Daniel Mann

- Theatrical poster
- Directed by: Daniel Mann
- Screenplay by: Robert Alan Aurthur
- Story by: Sidney Poitier
- Produced by: Edgar J. Scherick; Jay Weston
- Starring: Sidney Poitier; Abbey Lincoln; Beau Bridges; Nan Martin; Lauri Peters; Carroll O'Connor
- Music by: Quincy Jones
- Production company: Palomar Pictures
- Distributed by: Cinerama Releasing Corporation
- Release date: July 17, 1968
- Running time: 101 minutes
- Country: United States
- Language: English
- Budget: $2,590,000
- Box office: $7,270,000

For Love of Ivy is a 1968 American romantic comedy film directed by Daniel Mann. The film stars Sidney Poitier, Abbey Lincoln, Beau Bridges, Nan Martin, Lauri Peters, and Carroll O'Connor. The story was written by Poitier with screenwriter Robert Alan Aurthur. The musical score was composed by Quincy Jones. The theme song "For Love of Ivy", written by Quincy Jones and Bob Russell, was nominated for an Academy Award for Best Original Song. The film received Golden Globe supporting-acting nominations for Beau Bridges and Abbey Lincoln.

== Plot ==
Ivy Moore, a 27-year-old African-American woman, has worked as a maid for the department store owning Austin family of Long Island, New York, for nine years, since being brought by them from Florida, where she was raised by her grandmother. Despite protestations that they treat her as a part of the family, she announces her decision to leave her job and go to secretarial school and improve her situation.

The Austins are desperate to keep her, and the teenagers, Gena and Tim, hatch a scheme to do so. Tim Austin sets up Ivy with Jack Parks, a trucking company executive, to wine and dine Ivy. Tim hopes that the introduction of excitement in her life will dissuade her from leaving the family.

Tim persuades a reluctant Parks to date Ivy, and applies pressure by threatening to reveal his illegal gambling casino, which operates at night in the back of a large, long-distance truck.

Their initial meetings are awkward for the cosmopolitan Parks and the less sophisticated Moore, as they go to a Japanese restaurant and a bohemian nightclub in Manhattan. Eventually, however, romance blossoms, but when Moore learns that Parks was coerced into initially dating her, she breaks up with him.

Parks overcomes his attachment to swinging bachelorhood and asks Moore to leave with him for New York City. She accepts. As they do so, they witness the illegal casino being pulled over and everyone inside arrested after the Austins had called the police.

== Cast ==
- Sidney Poitier as Jack Parks
- Abbey Lincoln as Ivy Moore
- Beau Bridges as Tim Austin
- Nan Martin as Doris Austin
- Lauri Peters as Gena Austin
- Carroll O'Connor as Frank Austin
- Leon Bibb as Billy Talbot
- Hugh Hurd as Jerry
- Lon Satton as Harry
- Jennifer O'Neill as Sandy
- Paul Harris as Dealer

== Response ==
The film opened to positive reviews and was liked by both black and white audiences. Many applauded the performances of Sidney Poitier and Abbey Lincoln, and they were popular romantic leads. Even Ebony gave the two a cover story. Also applauded were Bridges and O'Connor; later, both actors appeared in films and TV shows, some dealing with racial issues. Bridges did the urban comedy-drama The Landlord and other films, and O'Connor landed other roles as he made his way to TV as Archie Bunker on All in the Family.

=== Box Office ===
The movie earned box-office rentals of $5,570,000 in North America with $1.7 million coming from the rest of the world. After distribution fees, prints and advertising, and the negative cost were taken away, the film recorded a profit of $390,000.

The film was released on Region 1 DVD by MGM Home Video January 20, 2004

== Musical score and soundtrack ==
For Love of Ivy

Soundtrack album by Quincy Jones
- Released: 1968
- Recorded: March 1968
- Genre: Film score
- Length: 39:47
- Labels: ABC; ABCS-OC-7
- Producer: Phil Ramone

Quincy Jones chronology
In Cold Blood (1967)	For Love of Ivy (1968)	MacKenna's Gold (1969)

The film score was composed, arranged, and conducted by Quincy Jones, and the soundtrack album was released on the ABC Records label in 1968. The title song performed by Shirley Horn, composed by Jones, with lyrics by Bob Russell, was released as a single by ABC Records.

=== Track listing ===
All compositions by Quincy Jones

1. "Main Title — For Love of Ivy" − 2:50
2. "Wheelin' and Dealin'" − 2:45
3. "Little Hippy Dippy" − 4:25
4. "Soul Motion" − 3:45
5. "Somethin' Strange" − 2:59
6. "Black Pearl" − 4:15
7. "For Love of Ivy" − 2:57
8. "You Put It On Me" (Lyrics by Maya Angelou) − 2:45
9. "The B. B. Jones" (Lyrics by Maya Angelou) − 2:25
10. "Messy But Good" − 2:35
11. "My Side of the Sky" (Lyrics by Cashman, Pistilli & West) − 2:43
12. "Don't You Believe It" (Lyrics by Cashman, Pistilli & West) − 2:29
13. "End Title — For Love of Ivy" (Lyrics by Bob Russell) − 2:54

=== Personnel ===
- Unidentified orchestra arranged and conducted by Quincy Jones including
  - B. B. King − vocals (tracks 8 and 9), guitar (track 10)
  - Shirley Horn − vocals (track 13)
  - Terry Cashman, Gene Pistilli & Tommy West − vocals (tracks 11 and 12)

== Themes ==
The rich family will use any manipulation and blackmail to keep their domestic in a subordinate position, tracing significant racial overtones.
