= Tanya Marquardt =

Canadian queer memoirist, performer and writer

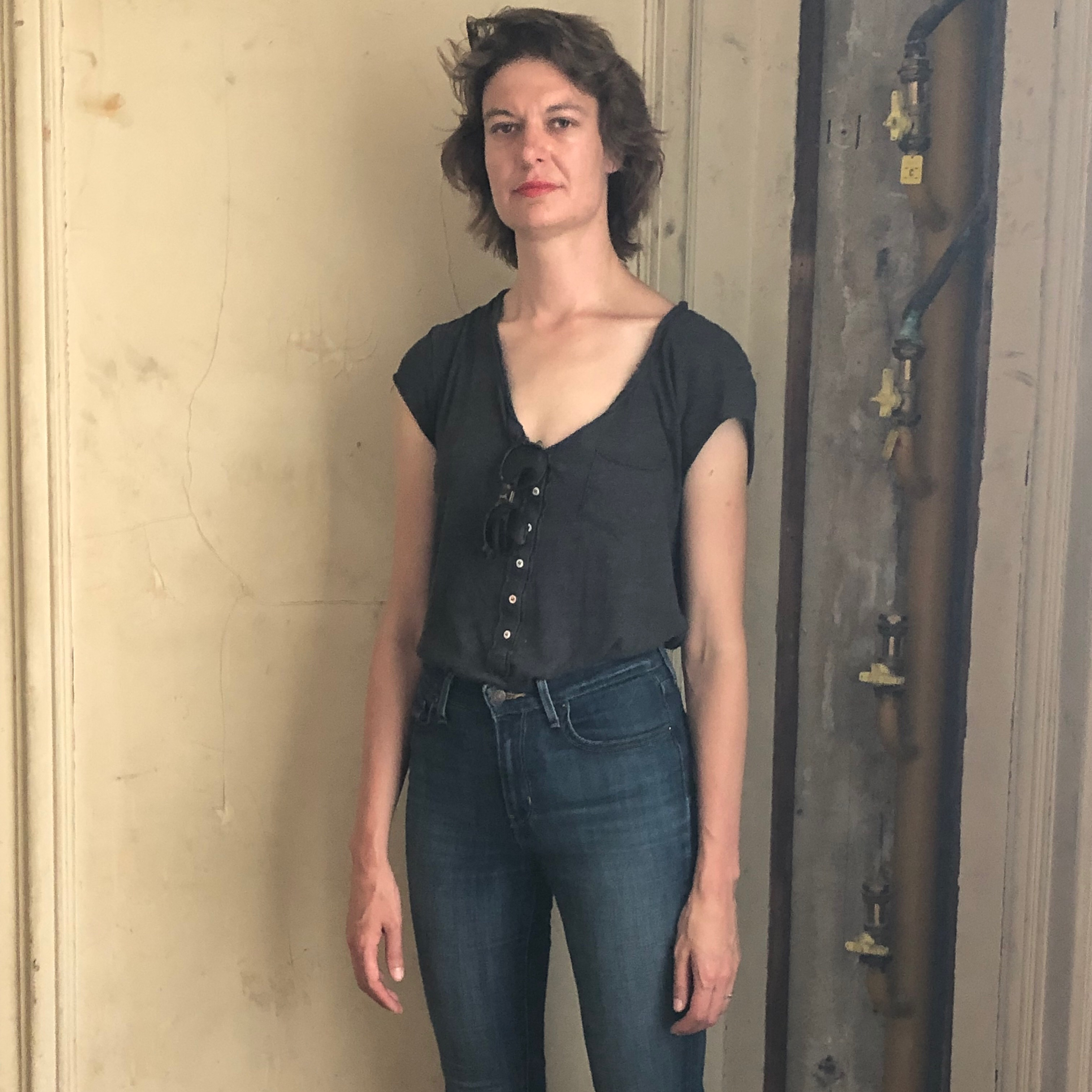
Photo of Tanya Marquardt

Tanya Marquardt (born November 1, 1979) is a memoirist, performer, and writer living in Vancouver, British Columbia, and Brooklyn, New York. Their plays and performances have toured throughout the US and Canada, their essays have been published in Medium, Huffpost UK, Plenitude Magazine, SpiderWeb Performance, and Dance Central and their play Transmission was published in the Canadian Theatre Review. Marquardt's first book Stray: Memoir of a Runaway was published by Little A in September 2018 and named a 2018 Best Queer History and Bio Pic by LGBTQ magazine The Advocate, who described Marquardt as "a compelling voice…[able to] embrace [their] own vulnerabilities and heal the wounds of the past as [they forge] ahead into adulthood."

== Biography ==
Marquardt was born in Regina, Saskatchewan on November 1, 1979. Their adoptive father was a traveling vacuum cleaner salesman and the family moved frequently. After their parents divorce, Marquardt relocated with their mother and two younger brothers to Port Alberni, British Columbia. At sixteen, Marquardt ran away from home and spent two years as "a stray, a kid who [felt] unwanted", sleeping on friends couches, living at their fathers house, and becoming involved in the Industrial, goth, and BDSM subcultures of early 90s Vancouver. These experiences became the subject of Stray: Memoir of a Runaway. Marquardt then attended Capilano University, taking classes in performance before completing undergraduate degree in theatre at Simon Fraser University. In 2004, Tanya received a certificate of dance from MainDance Society and graduated from the MFA Creative Writing Program at Hunter College in 2012, where mentors included Kathryn Harrison, Alexandra Styron, and Louise DeSalvo.

In a 2018 interview with Writer's Bone, Tanya described an early love of writing and art, saying:

"I was interested in language young, way before I went to kindergarten or learned how to read, and I would find [my mother's] grocery lists around the house and take my big crayons and copy out the letters like they were pictures...but it wasn't until later, around 12, when I got really interested in the craft. I was into poetry then, and though I also wrote in my diary at a fever pitch, I didn't really know I would become a playwright and an author until later...for me craft became a touchstone, a way to delve into my creativity and to lose myself in the possibilities of language. I love being in that world; it's a very private, very intimate place inside of me."

== Plays / Performance Works ==
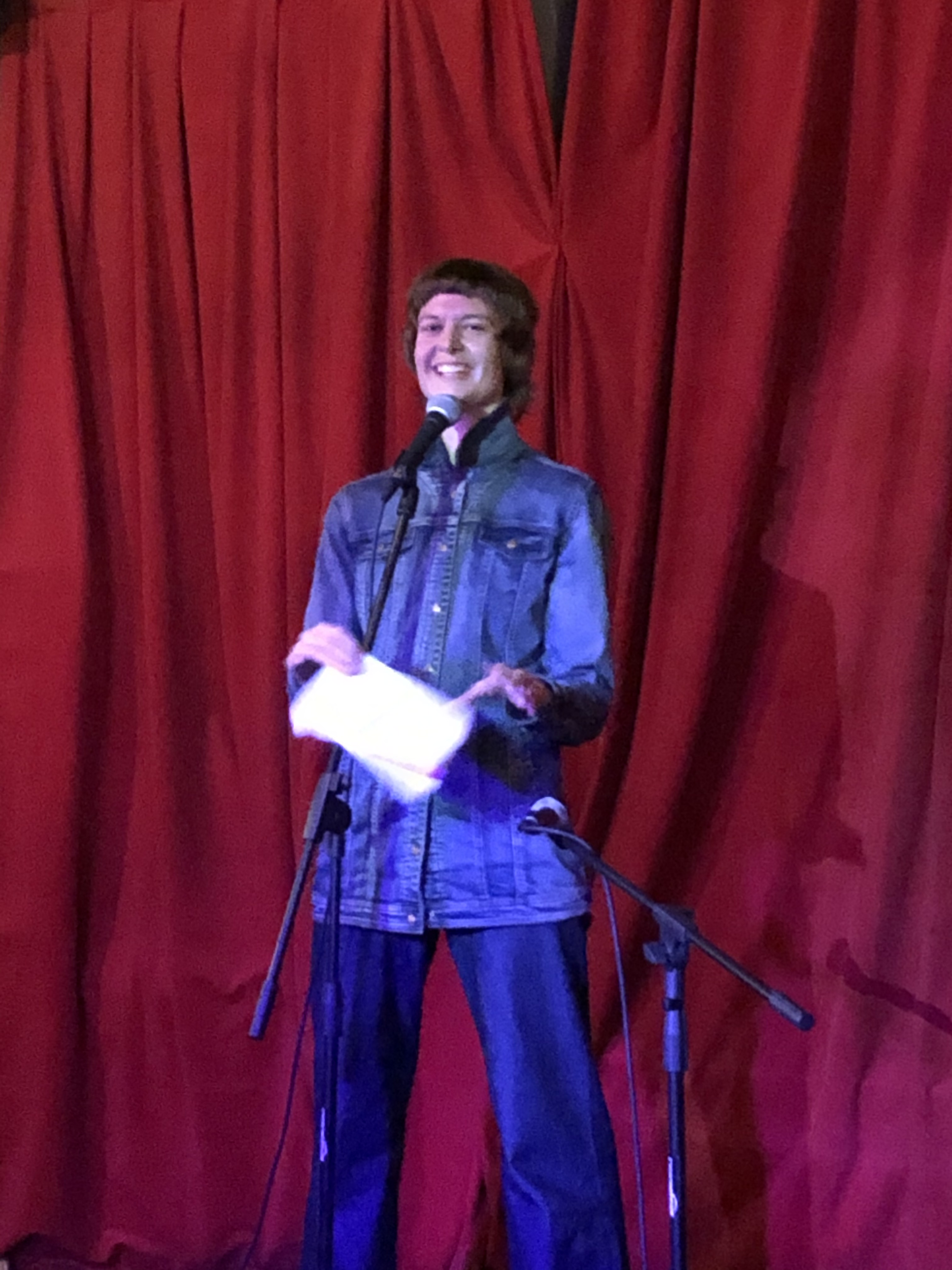
Tanya Marquardt performing in Brooklyn, NY, 2019.

Marquardt has worked with many theatre companies, including radix theatre, boca del lupo, the Leaky Heaven Circus, and Frank Theatre, where she produced Lounge, the story of a lonely lesbian lounge singer's search for home and true love, which was hailed by Globe & Mail's Michael Harris as having "all the hallmarks of a gin-soaked, down-and-out lounge act…." Lounge was the winner of the 2007 Sydney J Risk Emerging Playwright Award. In 2010, Marquardt performed in Jérôme Bel's The Show Must Go On with a Vancouver-based cast as part of the PuSh Festival.

Their plays and performance texts include: Liminal, about the death of a girl on her prom night after wearing a poisoned dress; Genie, a dance-theatre performance about feral children; Lounge; Transmission, a modern retelling of Sophocles' Orestes; Mal de Mer, a site specific performance about seasickness; Fragments, a play sourced from verbatim interviews with Whitehorse residents; Nocturne (an incomplete and inaccurate account of the love affair between George Sand & Frederic Chopin) which was produced at the rEvolver festival, NeXtFest, and Dixon Place; and a performance version of Stray, developed and produced with Theatre Conspiracy. Some Must Watch While Some Must Sleep, about life as a sleeptalker, was developed through an artistic residency with Mabou Mines and the Collapsable Hole; it was also the subject of an episode of NPR's Invisibilia.

== Stray: Memoir of a Runaway ==
Stray: Memoir of a Runaway was published September 1, 2018 by Little A, and centres around Marquardt's life as a teen runaway in the Industrial, goth, and BDSM subcultures of early 90s Vancouver. Stray was selected as one of the Best Queer History and Bios of 2018 by LGBTQ magazine The Advocate and was reviewed in The Vancouver Sun, HelloGiggles, Kirkus and Publishers Weekly who called the book "...an entirely relatable teenage journey: at once sensitive and selfish, desperate and brash."

Marquardt talks about the act of writing memoir in a 2018 interview with Longreads writer Wei Tchou:

"I feel there is a common misconception that memoir's not really literary, it's not really formal, it's just way for you to heal yourself. And I think that's a way for people to demean the form, to think of it as less than other literary genres...people like to identify a thing, and memoir is by nature unidentifiable. It's ephemeral. It's about how one investigates their own memory."

Marquardt co-wrote a performance version of Stray, a "meta-memoir-punk-show" with New York-based director Mallory Cattlet and Tim Carlson, Canadian theatre maker and Artistic Director of the Vancouver-based company Theatre Conspiracy. The show has been presented at The Tank in Manhattan, the SummerWorks Festival in Toronto, Magnetic North Theatre Festival, and Pi Theatre Provocateur's Series. Adrienne Urbanski of Theatre Is Easy praised the show as "...a work of dazzling ingenuity and raw self expression."

== Personal life ==
On March 6, 2019, Sara Rauch of literary magazine Full Stop spoke to Marquardt about coming out as queer in their mid-twenties and thirties:

"I [am] queer. I love cis-men and women, trans and non-binary people. But opening myself up to that kind of attraction, where many people could be a potential partner, was too overwhelming for me...[my past] abuse masked any sense of my own empowerment or pleasure. I had to break through all that to get to who I was, and for me that took years."
