= Lyn Vernon =

Canadian opera singer

Lyn Vernon (born August 19, 1944) is a Canadian mezzo-soprano, dramatic soprano, conductor, and teacher.

Born in New Westminster, Vernon took piano lessons in childhood before studying at the University of British Columbia, where her instructors included Barbara Custance, Kathryn Bailey, Marshall Sumner, and Donald Brown. She began her career in Vancouver by appearing in small roles. She joined the roster of the Zurich Opera in 1971, remaining there until 1975. In 1974 she returned to Canada to sing the role of the Female Chorus in The Rape of Lucretia at the Guelph Festival, winning much acclaim. For Toronto, she sang Marina in Boris Godunov and Judith in Duke Bluebeard's Castle. In 1975 she bowed at the London Coliseum as Octavian in Der Rosenkavalier. In the 1980s she turned to the dramatic soprano repertoire; she retired from active professional singing in 1985, continuing her career as a voice teacher. From 1978 she has taught privately in British Columbia, and in 1988 founded the Sunshine Coast Music Society, becoming its artistic director and conductor. Also in 1988, she joined the faculty of Capilano College, and she has been active in the realm of choral training as well.
