= Capilano University =

Public university in British Columbia, Canada

- Capilano University coat of arms
- Former name: Capilano College (1968–2008)
- Motto in English: "Through learning to a greater good"
- Type: Public
- Established: 1968; 58 years ago
- Academic affiliations: AUCC, CICan, UnivCan, CBIE, CUP
- Chancellor: Debra Doucette
- President: Jason Dewling
- Provost: Tracy Penny Light (interim)
- Students: 3,775 (2024-25 FTE)
- Location: North Vancouver, British Columbia, Canada: CapU Main Campus; CapU Lonsdale; Sechelt, British Columbia, Canada; kálax-ay the Sunshine Coast Campus; Squamish, British Columbia, Canada; CapU Squamish; Mount Currie, British Columbia, Canada; Ts̓zil Learning Centre
- Colours: Blue & white
- Nickname: Capilano Blues
- Sporting affiliations: PACWEST, CCAA; 6 varsity teams
- Mascot: Jay
- Website: capilanou.ca
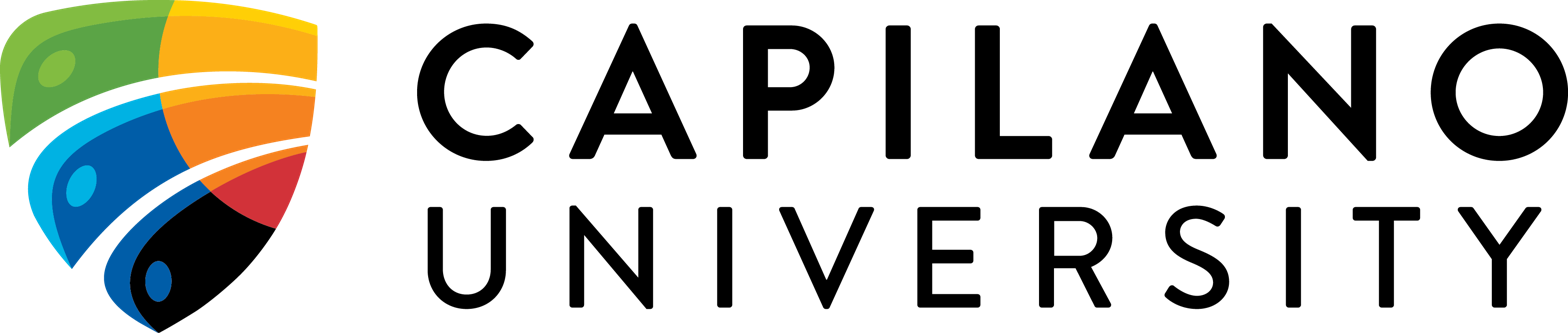

Capilano University (CapU) is a teaching-focused public university based in North Vancouver, British Columbia, Canada, located on the slopes of the North Shore Mountains, with programming that also serves the Sea-to-Sky Corridor and the Sunshine Coast. The university is named after Chief Joe Capilano, leader of the Squamish people from 1895 to 1910.

Capilano University's degree programs are approved by the Government of British Columbia's Ministry of Advanced Education, Skills and Training. The degree-granting powers of the university are legislated by British Columbia's University Act. In 2012, CapU became Canada's first university to receive accreditation from the Northwest Commission on Colleges and Universities (or NWCCU) in Washington, one of six major regional agencies in the U.S. that are recognized by the United States Department of Education.

Capilano University's sports teams, the Blues, have won 15 national titles in the Canadian Collegiate Athletic Association, and 61 provincial titles in the Pacific Western Athletic Association.

The university was originally founded as Capilano College by school boards and residents of the North Shore and Howe Sound in 1968 based on the need for a public institution serving the local communities immediately northwest of Vancouver. Initial enrolment was 784 students. In 2008, the province changed Capilano College's designation to a university and, as of 2019, it has grown to enrol approximately 12,700 students per year.

Capilano University is most reputed for its programs in visual and performing arts, especially in animation, cinematography, jazz, and visual effects.

== History ==
=== Founding ===
The school boards of North and West Vancouver, Howe Sound and Sechelt formed a committee to determine the need for a community college to serve the region. The proposal to build a college on the North Shore passed by a plebiscite in North and West Vancouver and the Howe Sound in 1968. The provincial government granted approval, and Capilano College had its name selected from submissions made by North Shore residents, in honour of Chief Joe Capilano of the Sḵwx̱wú7mesh Coast Salish nation. Capilano College opened on September 10, 1968, with 784 students attending classes after hours at West Vancouver Secondary. The Capilano College Foundation was created in 1970 to provide scholarships and bursaries for students.

In 1970, construction began on the North Vancouver campus in the Lynnmour area. Three years later, the permanent North Vancouver campus opened with 1,965 students in attendance. The first vocational programs were offered in portable buildings brought from West Vancouver Secondary. The first permanent structure at the North Vancouver campus, the original library building, also opened. In 1975 Capilano College opened the Squamish Learning Centre and Community Information Services at 38038 Cleveland Avenue in Squamish. In 1976, the Arbutus building opened at the North Vancouver campus and the Fir building opened in 1982. In 1991, the Cedar building, the Sportsplex, and Horticulture building were completed. Two years later, a new library replaced the former at the North Vancouver campus, tripling the size of existing library space. In 1996, the Birch building at the North Vancouver campus was completed, housing a performance theatre, classrooms, student services, and teaching space. The Child Care Centre also opened the same year. With regards to its other locations, the university opened the Capilano kálax-ay Sunshine Coast campus in Sechelt in 1977, the CapU Lonsdale location in 2019, and the CapU Squamish campus in 2024. It also holds classes at Ts̓zil Learning Centre in Mount Currie, BC.

=== Expansion ===
Capilano College offered its first bachelor degree, a collaborative degree in music therapy, with the British Columbia Open University in 1990 and added a second music degree in jazz studies in 1992. Business administration degrees were first offered in 1993. That year, Capilano College also conferred its first associate degrees, which are now available to students in a variety of subject areas from Interdisciplinary Arts, Creative Writing, English, Global Stewardship, Psychology, Interdisciplinary Sciences and Biology. The college was authorized by the provincial government in 2003 to become the first college in British Columbia to independently grant applied degrees after the dissolution of the B.C. Open University. In 2004, Capilano College was also named by the provincial government as host of the British Columbia Centre for Tourism Leadership and Innovation, in preparations for the 2010 Winter Olympics. The Centre addressed tourism issues, helped provide tourism education, and was part of the larger British Columbia Tourism and Hospitality Education and Training Consortium. In 2008, the centre was merged into Link BC, an education network for tourism and hospitality with industry organizations which resulted in partnerships with organizations and opportunities for students. In 2008, the provincial government changed Capilano College's designation to Capilano University. CapU also joined the OpenCourseWare consortium, and began the process for accreditation from the Northwest Commission on Colleges and Universities (which it received in 2012).

== Campuses ==
Capilano University has four campuses. Its main campus is located at 2055 Purcell Way in North Vancouver (district municipality), on Metro Vancouver's North Shore. It is approximately a 30-minute drive from Downtown Vancouver. The majority of the programs are offered at this campus. There is also a smaller regional campus, referred to as the kálax-ay Sunshine Coast Campus in Sechelt, British Columbia that serves the communities of the Sunshine Coast. In September 2019, CapU admitted students to CapU Lonsdale, the Shipyards Development in North Vancouver's Lower Lonsdale.

The CapU Squamish campus, located at 3200 University Boulevard, Squamish, British Columbia, opened in Fall 2024. The 18-acre site includes academic teaching and learning spaces, student housing, a dining area, a library, an athletic centre and a FIFA-grade turf field. The location was the former campus Quest University in Squamish. Capilano University purchased the campus in August 2023, after Quest University ceased operating in February 2023 due to financial difficulties.

The university also holds classes at the Ts̓zil Learning Centre in Mount Currie, British Columbia.

== Academics ==
=== Profile ===
Capilano University offers 97 programs through 5 faculties: the Faculty of Arts & Sciences; the Faculty of Business & Professional Studies; the Faculty of Education, Health & Human Development; the Faculty of Fine & Applied Arts; and the Faculty of Global & Community Studies.

Within the Faculty of Arts & Sciences, there is the School of Social Sciences (with programs in Arts, Academic Studies, Applied Behaviour Analysis (Autism), Psychology, and Liberal Studies); the School of Humanities (with programs in Arts, Creative Writing, English, Liberal Studies, and Lil'wat Nation, Sechelt, or Squamish Nation Language and Cultural Studies); and the School of Science, Technology, Engineering & Mathematics or STEM (with programs in Biology, Science, Engineering, and Health Career Pathways).

The Faculty of Business & Professional Studies includes is the School of Business (with programs in Accounting, Business Administration, Advanced Business Administration, and Retail Business); the School of Communication; and the School of Legal Studies (with programs in Legal Studies - Paralegal, Contract Law, and Legal Administration).

The Faculty of Education, Health & Human Development includes the School of Access & Academic Preparation (with programs in College and University Preparation, Community Capacity Building, Community Leadership and Social Change, Education and Employment Access, English for Academic Purposes, and University One for Aboriginal Learners); the School of Allied Health (with programs in Music Therapy, Health Care, and Rehabilitation); and the School of Education & Childhood Studies (with programs in Early Childhood Care and Education, Education Assistant and subspecialties in Infants and Toddlers as well as Special Needs).

Its Faculty of Fine & Applied Arts offers the IDEA School of Design (programs in Visual Communication); the School of Motion Picture Arts (with programs in Motion Picture Arts, Costuming for Stage and Screen, Indigenous Independent Digital Filmmaking, Lighting for Digital Imaging and Film, Grip Work for Digital Imaging and Film, 2D Animation & Visual Development, 3D Animation for Film and Games, Animation Fundamentals, and Digital Visual Effects); and the School of Performing Arts (with programs in Acting for Stage and Screen, Advanced Arts & Entertainment Management, Performing Arts, Music, Conducting in Music, Music Therapy, Musical Theatre, Technical Theatre, and Jazz Studies with subspecialties in Education and/or Performance/Composition).

The Faculty of Global & Community Studies offers the School of Global Stewardship; the School of Human Kinetics; the School of Outdoor Recreation Management; the School of Public Administration (with programs in Local Government Administration, Advanced Local Government Administration and Local Government Leadership Development); and the School of Tourism Management (with programs in Tourism Management, Global Hospitality & Tourism Management, Tourism Management Co-operative Education, Tourism Management for International Students, and Tourism Marketing).

Capilano University offers joint partnerships and projects as part of the university's commitment to international education. It has dual degree and post graduate programs, as well as development partnerships with a number of schools abroad.

== Scholarships, bursaries and awards ==
Capilano University provides over 250 scholarships and bursaries for current and returning students. The university provides scholarships for academic achievement, bursaries based on financial need, and awards are given based on a combination of top marks, athletic achievement, extra-curricular activities or other special achievements, and sometimes are also based on financial need.

These include the Capilano University Achievement Access Award, Wong and Trainor Award, Capilano University Athletic Award, Xats’alanexw Siyam Award, Indigenous Students Bursary, Borden Ladner Gervais Scholarship, Mary Neil Bursary and Neptune Terminals International Experience Award.

== CapU residence and housing ==
=== North Vancouver ===
The CapU student residences currently accommodate up to 293 students. The residences are located on Dollarton Highway, 10 minutes from main campus.

The real estate development company, Woodbridge Northwest Communities, is proposing a Capilano University Village including a six-floor condominium tower, three and four-floor townhouses, 60 dormitories for CapU students, and an amenities building at the North Vancouver campus. The company's plan also includes personalized student kitchens, a swimming pool, clubhouse and children's play area.

Another North Vancouver developer is offering to build rental apartments exclusively for Capilano University's students and staff. Darwin Properties has submitted an application to build 346 units of rental housing in two six-storey buildings. The company also wants to build an adjacent cafe.

=== Squamish ===
The Capilano University Squamish campus has three buildings dedicated to student residence, providing over 200 rooms for student housing. The buildings are clustered together, where students can study, dine, socialize and relax. Residences are close to facilities including food services and a recreation complex.

== Campus life ==
=== Athletics ===
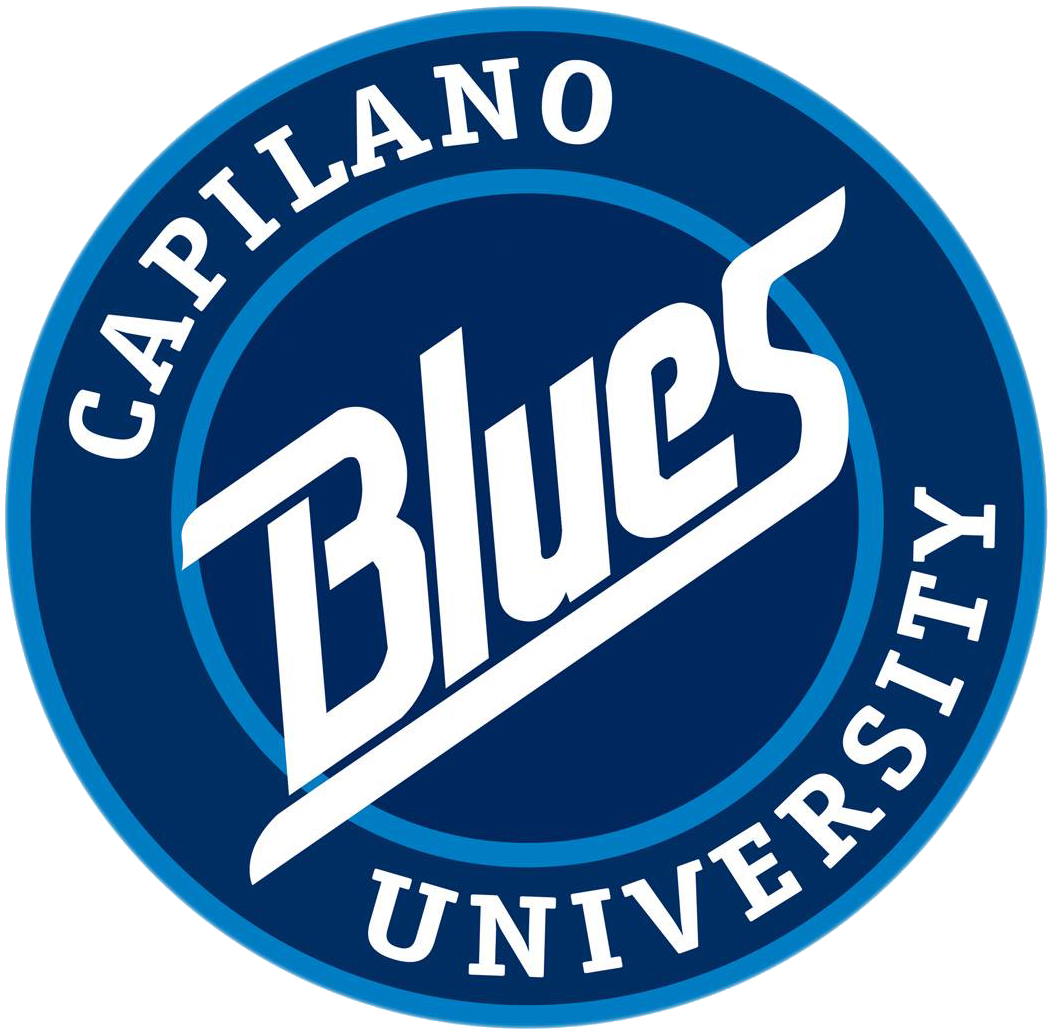
Capilano athletics logo

Between 1974 and 1999, the Capilano Blues won the CCAA Soccer Supremacy Award for both men's and women's soccer. To date, Capilano teams have won 15 CCAA National Titles and 61 TOTEM/BCCAA/PACWEST Provincial Championships.

Capilano University has six men's and women's varsity sports teams, the Capilano Blues, that play at the provincial and national levels. The Blues are based at Capilano University's Centre for Sport and Wellness on main campus.

=== University media ===
- The main student newspaper, The Capilano Courier, is staffed by students and operates independently of the university and the student society. It is published twice per month.
- Capilano University's creative writing students publish a literary magazine, The Liar, once a year with funding from the English department.
- The university faculty established The Capilano Review in 1972. It is an arts journal highlighting poetry, fiction, drama, and visual art. In 2015, the magazine became an independent publication based in downtown Vancouver.
- The university also founded Capilano University Editions (CUE) in 2008, a book publishing imprint of the Capilano Press Society focusing on Canadian avant garde writing and art. It now operates independently from the university as CUE Books.
- Capilano Radio is a student-run podcast production which started in 2019.
- Launched in November 2020, Capsule is the work of CapU's marketing and digital experience team, a collective of diverse talents but one common thread that unites us is our love of storytelling.

=== Student organizations ===
Capilano Students' Union

Every student enrolled in a credit program at Capilano University is a member of the Capilano Students' Union (CSU). The CSU is the resident student society of Capilano University and benefits the university and the community by advancing the interests of students. Like other student societies in British Columbia, the CSU's mandate is to advocate for students and provide services and events that improve the student experience. While the day-to-day management and operations are entrusted to a board of directors composed of elected students, governed by the constitution and bylaws of the society, students are ultimately in control of the activities of the CSU. The board of directors consists of five vice-presidents, seven liaisons representing special interest groups, two representatives for each faculty, four senate representatives, and two representatives to the university's board of governors. The CSU is registered under the Society Act of B.C. and receives funding from membership fees, collected from students by the university in accordance with the University Act.

The CSU provides services to its members, including a low-cost transit pass, free day planner, a used book sale, and health and dental benefits. Student interests are represented by the CSU, and the views of students are presented and advocated for in meetings with university administrators and representatives of local, provincial and federal governments.

== People ==
Capilano University’s alumni, previous, and current faculty include 1 Academy Award recipient, 1 Andrew A. Mellon fellow, 1 Austrian Academy of Sciences fellow, 1 Canadian Screen Award recipient, 2 Canadian Soccer Hall of Fame inductees, 1 Civitella Ranieri fellow, 1 Eisner Award recipient, 2 Gemini Award recipient, 2 Grammy Award recipients, 6 Governor General’s Award recipients, 6 Juno Award recipients, 1 Killam Prize recipient, 2 members of the Legislative Assembly of British Columbia, 1 Lowell Thomas Travel Journalism Award recipient, 1 MacDowell fellow, and 1 fellow of the Royal Canadian Geographic Society. In 2019, singer and songwriter Sarah McLachlan received the degree of Doctor of Fine Arts, honoris causa from Capilano University.

=== Notable alumni ===
- Jessie Anthony - Onondaga director, screenwriter, and producer
- Nick Bateman - model, performer, and actor
- Silvana Burtini - 1998 Canadian Player of the Year
- Rick Celebrini - head of sports medicine for Whitecaps FC
- DJ Clazzi - South Korean composer, singer, lyricist, record producer and DJ
- Hassan Phills - Stand-up comedian, actor, content creator
- Paul Dailly - Scottish-Canadian soccer coach
- Craig Dalrymple - head of professional player development for the Seattle Sounders FC
- Camilla d'Errico - comic book illustrator, painter and visual artist
- Luisa D’Oliveira - actress
- Joel Fafard - finger-style and slide guitarist
- Liam Firus - businessman
- Godfrey Gao (1984-2019) - Taiwanese-Canadian model and actor
- Jamie Garratt - president of Idea Rebel
- Jennifer Gasoi - children's musician
- Gigi Saul Guerrero - Mexican filmmaker and actress
- Julia Gretarsdottir - five-time national medalist in the Icelandic Figure Skating Championships
- Hilary Grist - singer and songwriter
- Helen Haig-Brown - Tsilhqot'in filmmaker
- Anosh Irani - Indian-Canadian novelist
- Jamie Lee Hamilton - political candidate, Indigenous, DTES, and sex worker advocate
- Adrian Kekec - soccer player
- Cherelle Khassal - Irish footballer
- Elicia MacKenzie - musical theatre actress
- Tanya Marquardt - memoirist, performer, and writer
- Cheri Maracle - Indigenous actress and musician
- Camille Mitchell - American-Canadian actress, writer and director
- David Morris - retired soccer player
- Chelsey Reist - actress, television host, and dancer
- Lana Roi - recording artist and songwriter
- Steve Rolston - artist, comic book and graphic novel writer
- Bria Skonberg - trumpeter and vocalist
- Cowboy Smithx - Blackfoot filmmaker
- Chantal Strand - voice and stage actress
- Charles van Sandwyk - artist, illustrator and writer
- Desmond Tachie - soccer player
- Graham Wardle - actor, filmmaker and photographer
- Cory Weeds - saxophonist and impresario, winner of the 2023 Grammy Awards
- Jonathan Whitesell - actor
- Kristian Yli-Hietanen - Finnish-Canadian soccer player
- Nima Moazeni Zadeh - Iranian footballer
- Elizabeth Zvonar - contemporary artist
- Soichiro Nakano - karateka, bronze medalist in the men's 67 kg event at the 2021 World Karate Championships

=== Notable faculty ===
- Gillian Barber, actress
- Bill Coon, Jazz musician and composer
- Pierre Coupey, painter, poet and founding editor of the Capilano Review
- Ivan Coyote, spoken word performer, writer, and LGBT advocate
- Jackson Davies, actor
- Leonard George, Psychologist and schizophrenia researcher
- Jordan Hall, Writer, playwright, and web series creator
- Daniel Hersog, Jazz trumpeter and band leader
- Steve Kaldestad, Jazz saxophonist and music educator
- Nicholas Kendall, Film and television director
- Crawford Kilian, Novelist and college professor
- Ryan Knighton, Writer, winner of the 2012 and 2018 Lowell Thomas Travel Journalism Award
- John Korsrud, Jazz trumpeter and composer
- Frank Molnar, Hungarian-Canadian artist
- John Pass, English-Canadian poet, winner of the 2006 Governor General's Awards for Literary Merit
- Stan Persky (1941–2024), American-Canadian writer, media commentator, and philosophy instructor
- Jodi Proznick, Jazz bassist, composer, educator, and producer
- Meredith Quartermain, Poet, novelist, and story writer
- Bill Schermbrucker, Kenyan-Canadian academic and author
- Anita Sleeman, Contemporary classical music composer, conductor, arranger, educator, and performer
- George Stanley, poet
- Bill Terry, CBC executive and author
- Sharon Thesen, poet
- Brad Turner, Jazz trumpeter and pianist, winner of the 1997, 1998, 2017, and 2020 Juno Awards
- Lyn Vernon, Mezzo-soprano, dramatic soprano, conductor, and teacher
- Á'a:líya Warbus, Stó꞉lō artist, filmmaker, singer, professor, member of the Legislative Assembly of British Columbia (since 2024)
- Frances Wasserlein (1946–2015), Canadian-American arts community manager and LGBTQ rights activist
- Gordon Wilson, Professor, member of the Legislative Assembly of British Columbia (1991-2001), 28th leader of the Opposition of British Columbia
- Peter Woeste, German-Canadian television director, cinematographer, camera operator

== See also ==
- Higher education in British Columbia
- List of universities in British Columbia
