= Jamie Garratt =

- Born: 1977 or 1978 (age 46–47); Toronto, Ontario, Canada
- Education: University of British Columbia
- Occupation(s): CEO and founder of Idea Rebel

Jamie Garratt (born 1977 or 1978) is a Canadian entrepreneur. He is the president & founder of Idea Rebel, a Canadian digital marketing agency started in 2008.

== Personal life ==
Jamie was born in Toronto, Ontario, Canada. Garratt began his studies at Capilano University in Commerce. He later switched to University of British Columbia, where he enrolled in Computer Science.

Garratt is also a musician. He is the guitarist in a band called Exit this Side. They celebrated their 20th anniversary as a band in 2016.

== Career ==
Garratt is the CEO and founder of Vancouver-based digital marketing agency Idea Rebel. Garratt is responsible for managing and leading the strategic direction for the company. Idea Rebel has offices in Vancouver, Toronto and Santa Monica. The company has gained awards including Top 20 Innovators for 2012 (BC Business Magazine), Top Companies in BC (Small Business BC), and a Gold Virtual Reality Award for Converse Chuck Taylors "Made By You" (AToMiC Awards).

== Awards ==
- Entrepreneur of the Year - Finalist 2013 - Ernst & Young
- Top 40 Under 40 - 2013/2014 - Business In Vancouver

== Family ==
Garratt is the great-grandson of Phillip Clarke Garratt, aviator and managing director of de Havilland Canada from 1936 to 1970.
