= Elicia MacKenzie =

Canadian musical theatre actress (born 1985)

- Born: Elicia MacKenzie; 1985 (age 40–41)
- Occupation: musical theatre actress

Elicia MacKenzie (born 1985) is a Canadian musical theatre actress who won the 2008 CBC Television contest How Do You Solve a Problem Like Maria?.

As a result of winning the contest, she played Maria, the lead, in the Toronto revival of The Sound of Music from October 2008 through January 2010. She went on to star as Sherrie in Mirvish Productions' Rock of Ages at Toronto's Royal Alexandra Theatre from April 2010 through January 2011 and on the first U.S. tour. She appeared as Dorothy in The Wizard of Oz, Ross Petty Productions' 2011 pantomime at Toronto's Elgin Theatre from November 2011 through January 2012.

MacKenzie is currently represented by Toronto agency The Talent House and Carrier Talent Management in Vancouver.

== Biography ==
MacKenzie was born in Moncton, New Brunswick. A self-described tomboy growing up in Surrey, British Columbia, she participated in children's choirs and various singing competitions. Her first job was at age 15, at De Dutch Pannekoek House in Vancouver. At age 16 she auditioned for Canadian Idol but was passed over because she sounded "too musical theatre". She graduated in 2008 from the musical theatre program at Capilano College, and had major roles in productions such as High School Musical in North Vancouver in 2007, in which she portrayed Gabriella . She was about to take a part in a community theatre production of Cinderella, as a wicked stepsister, and was also considering a career in massage therapy, when her uncle noticed the audition call for the CBC show.

On How Do You Solve a Problem Like Maria? after thousands of people auditioned in early 2008, she competed against 47 other finalists, who were eliminated by a combination of judges' decisions and viewer voting, although once the final two were selected, the winner was chosen only by fans. She beat out Janna Polzin of Woodstock, Ontario, who was widely expected to win. Composer and judge Andrew Lloyd Webber referred to MacKenzie as "the dark horse" of the competition.

The role of Maria was her first professional acting credit. Reviews of the Toronto show weren almost uniformly positive, and the show's success, despite the recession, was credited largely to MacKenzie. She played the role of Sherrie Christian in the Toronto production of the musical Rock of Ages and on the first U.S. tour.
