= Hilary Grist =

Canadian singer-songwriter

- Born: Quesnel, British Columbia, Canada
- Origin: Vancouver, British Columbia, Canada
- Genres: Indie pop, Folk, Jazz
- Occupation: Singer-songwriter
- Instruments: Piano, vocals
- Years active: 2005–present
- Website: hilarygrist.com

Hilary Grist is a Canadian singer-songwriter based in Vancouver, British Columbia, Canada. Grist is notable for her song placements that have been part of ten major television shows. As well, Grist is notable for her international following in Japan and South Korea, where she toured in 2012.

== Early life ==
Grist was born in Quesnel, British Columbia and raised in Maple Ridge, British Columbia. She is a graduate of Capilano University Jazz Studies program in North Vancouver.

== Career ==
In 2011, Grist was awarded fourth place in the Peak 102.7 CKPK-FMradio contest supporting emerging musical talent, and received considerable airplay as a result. Her songs have made the Top 10 in campus radio across Canada. As well, she was featured in the iTunes Indie Singer-Songwriter Spotlight.

Her influences are as diverse as Ella Fitzgerald, and Tom Waits, along with Debussy. Accordingly, her songwriting and performance style incorporates elements of jazz, folk, pop, and classical.

Grist released the follow-up album to 2010's Imaginings in 2014, called Come & Go. In June 2015, she will release a children's storybook with imaginative photographs and original artwork along with an album of dream songs called Tomorrow Is A Chance To Start Over, published by The Secret Mountain.

=== TV, film and commercial appearances ===
Grist's "Tomorrow Is A Chance To Start Over" was a major feature of a second-season episode of the hit NBC series, Grimm in 2012. The song formed an integral part of the plot and ran during a romantic scene of the "Bottle Imp" episode. Also on NBC in 2012, the show Being Human featured Grist's song "Something Beautiful"; as well, the song was featured on CHEK-TV's Go To Gal and Hallmark Channel's Cedar Cove.

Grist's ballad "Swallow Me Up" was featured in a series filmed in Vancouver, Continuum, which was carried by cable giant Showcase in the spring of 2012. "Swallow Me Up" and "Say Goodnight" were featured on the CBC Television series, Arctic Air in 2013. In early 2014, Grist's songs "Chemical Reaction" and "City of Green and Blue" were both featured on W Network's series Tessa & Scott, based on the Canadian olympic figure skating partners Tessa Virtue and Scott Moir. Also on W Network, Grist's song "Lay Your Heavy Head Down" was featured on Hockey Wives in 2015.

As well, the MuchMusic series Degrassi: The Next Generation, syndicated worldwide, has placed three of Grist's songs, "Right For You", "Waltzing Matilda" and "Stick Of Dynamite". The latter song also appeared in the CTV Television Network series Endgame. Grist also acted in a supporting role for Every Second Tuesday, a feature film by Canadian director David King.

Grist contributed an instrumental song called "Matilda's Theme" to the very successful Cornetto (ice cream) Cupidity Love Stories commercial ad campaign in 2014.

=== Tour history ===
Grist toured in Asia in support of her album Imaginings in 2012, playing four shows at Tokyo's Cotton Club. On this same tour, Grist performed at two major festivals, the Busan International Rock Festival and the Ulsan World Music Festival.

Grist has performed in many Canadian festivals as well: the 20th annual Salmon Arm Roots and Blues Festival, the Edge Of the World Festival in Haida Gwaii, the Vancouver International Jazz Festival, the Maple Ridge Jazz and Blues Festival, Pop Okanagan, and North by Northeast, among others. She has also toured across Canada several times and appeared on CBC Radio 2 Live, CBC Radio One and CBC Radio Toque Sessions.

=== Animation ===
In addition to being a singer-songwriter, Grist is also a visual artist and illustrator. Her whimsical cartoons and chalk drawings are featured in stop motion animation in videos "Chemical Reaction", "Silver Lining", "Don't Forget Who Loves You", "Angels We Have Heard On High", "Branches Arms", and "Save You For Last".

=== Media coverage ===
Tom Harrison of The Province notes that ". . . there is a certain playfulness to her pop, which comes to the fore on 'Tall Buildings' and 'Save You For Last.' I wonder if Grist is a fan of early Randy Newman?" while John McLaughlin of The Province comments ". . . After a couple of live CDs, Grist's first studio project, Imaginings, co-produced by her sound engineer husband, Mike Southworth, may well be the start of her own Norah Jones-like career arc. She certainly has the goods and you never, ever know where that lightning's going to strike again." As well, an article in The Vancouver Sun detailed the making of one of her videos: "Vancouver-based singer-songwriter Hilary Grist‘s video for her song Tall Buildings, which features a giant cardboard city built atop Grist’s piano as well as some pretty spiffy stop-motion animation, took over two months to complete."

== Discography ==
=== Albums ===
- Tomorrow is a Chance to Start Over (2015)
- Come & Go (2014)
- Imaginings (2010)
- It's Officially Winter Now (2011)
- Little Ditties (2009)
- On My Way (2005)

=== Music Videos ===
- Come & Go
- Chemical Reaction
- Waltzing Matilda
- Silver Lining
- A Little While
- Swallow Me Up
- Tall Buildings
- Right For You
- Don't Forget Who Loves You
- Shine A Light on a Child
- Stick Of Dynamite
- Just Imagine
- Save You For Last
- Something Beautiful
- Angels We Have Heard On High
- Holy Winter
- What Child Is This?
- Branches Arms
