= Jean Bayless =

British actress (1932–2021)

Jean Bayless (29 June 1932 – 5 February 2021) was a British actress. She is best remembered for starring as Maria in the London production of The Sound of Music.

== Life and career ==
Bayless was born in Hackney, London. Her family was evacuated to Blackpool during the Second World War, where she started to take singing lessons. She later trained at the Italia Conti Academy of Theatre Arts. Early in her career, she performed in pantomimes at the London Palladium.

In 1955 she was a replacement, starring as Polly in the Broadway production of The Boy Friend (credited as Jo Ann Bayless), and she starred as Maria in the original West End production of The Sound of Music in 1960. She played the role of Cynthia Cunningham in the early 1970s in the soap opera Crossroads. She also performed with Audrey Hepburn in Sauce Tartare.

== Personal life ==
With her husband David Johnson, she had two sons, Daniel and Adam.

She died of bone cancer in Birmingham at the age of 88.
