= Bill Terry (author) =

Canadian garden writers and business executive (born 20th century)

Billy Terry (born 20th century) is a Canadian writer and an executive with the Canadian Broadcasting Corporation.

He specializes in plant propagation and has lectured at North Vancouver's Capilano University continuing-education program.

He has written books, including Blue Heaven: Encounters with the Blue Poppy (2009); Beyond Beauty: Hunting the Wild Blue Poppy (2012); Beauty by Design: Inspired Gardening in the Pacific Northwest (2013, co-written with his wife, Rosemary Bates); and The Carefree Garden: Letting Nature Play Her Part (2015).

== Personal life ==
Terry lives in British Columbia.

== References and links ==
- TouchWood Editions. Retrieved July 6, 2009
- My Blue Heaven
- Books for Everybody
