= The Sound of Music =

Musical by Rodgers and Hammerstein, premiered in 1959

- Original Broadway poster (1959)
- Music: Richard Rodgers
- Lyrics: Oscar Hammerstein II
- Book: Howard Lindsay; Russel Crouse
- Basis: The Story of the Trapp Family Singers by Maria von Trapp
- Productions: 1959 Broadway; 1961 West End; 1981 West End revival; 1998 Broadway revival; 2006 West End revival; 2009 UK tour; 2015 North American tour; 2015 UK tour; 2025 North American tour
- Awards: Tony Award for Best Musical

The Sound of Music is a musical with music by Richard Rodgers, lyrics by Oscar Hammerstein II, and a book by Howard Lindsay and Russel Crouse. It is based on the 1949 book The Story of the Trapp Family Singers by Maria von Trapp. Set in Austria on the eve of the Anschluss in 1938, the musical tells the story of Maria, who takes a job as governess to a large family while she decides whether to become a nun. She falls in love with the children, and eventually their widowed father, Captain von Trapp. He is ordered to accept a commission in the German Navy, but he opposes the Nazis. He and Maria decide on a plan to flee Austria with the children. Many songs from the musical have become standards, including "Do-Re-Mi", "My Favorite Things", "Edelweiss", "Climb Ev'ry Mountain", and the title song "The Sound of Music".

The original Broadway production, starring Mary Martin and Theodore Bikel, opened in 1959 and won five Tony Awards, including Best Musical, out of nine nominations. The first London production opened at the Palace Theatre in 1961. The show has enjoyed numerous productions and revivals since then. It was adapted as a 1965 film starring Julie Andrews and Christopher Plummer, which won five Academy Awards, including Best Picture. The Sound of Music was the last musical written by Rodgers and Hammerstein, as Oscar Hammerstein died of stomach cancer nine months after the Broadway premiere.

== History ==
After viewing The Trapp Family, a 1956 West German film about the Trapp family, and its 1958 sequel (The Trapp Family in America), stage director Vincent J. Donehue thought that the project would be perfect for his friend Mary Martin; Broadway producers Leland Hayward and Richard Halliday (Martin's husband) agreed. The producers originally envisioned a non-musical play that would be written by Lindsay and Crouse and would feature songs from the repertoire of the Trapp Family Singers. Later they decided to add an original song or two, perhaps by Rodgers and Hammerstein. But finally it was agreed that the project should feature all new songs and be a musical rather than a play.

Details of the history of the von Trapp family were altered for the musical. The real Georg von Trapp did live with his family in a villa in Aigen, a suburb of Salzburg. He wrote to the Nonnberg Abbey in 1926 asking for a nun to help tutor his sick daughter, and the Mother Abbess sent Maria. His wife, Agathe Whitehead, had died in 1922. The real Maria and Georg married at the Nonnberg Abbey in 1927. Lindsay and Crouse altered the story so that Maria was governess to all of the children, whose names and ages were changed, as was Maria's original surname (the show used "Rainer" instead of "Kutschera"). The von Trapps spent some years in Austria after Maria and the Captain married and he was offered a commission in Germany's navy. Since von Trapp opposed the Nazis at that time, the family left Austria after the Anschluss, going by train to Italy and then traveling on to London and the United States. To make the story more dramatic, Lindsay and Crouse had the family, soon after Maria's and the Captain's wedding, escape over the mountains to Switzerland on foot.

== Synopsis ==
=== Act I ===
In Salzburg, Federal State of Austria, just before World War II, nuns from Nonnberg Abbey sing the Dixit Dominus. One of the postulants, Maria Rainer, is on the nearby mountainside, regretting leaving the beautiful hills ("The Sound of Music"). She returns late to the abbey where the Mother Abbess and the other nuns have been considering what to do about the free-spirit ("Maria"). Maria explains her lateness, saying she was raised on that mountain, and apologizes for singing in the garden without permission. The Mother Abbess joins her in song ("My Favorite Things"). The Mother Abbess tells her that she should spend some time outside the abbey to decide whether she is suited for the monastic life. She will act as the governess to the seven children of a widower, Austro-Hungarian Navy submarine Captain Georg von Trapp.

Maria arrives at the villa of Captain von Trapp. He explains her duties and summons the children with a boatswain's call. They march in, clad in uniforms. He teaches her their individual signals on the call, but she openly disapproves of this militaristic approach. Alone with them, she breaks through their wariness and teaches them the basics of music ("Do-Re-Mi").

Rolf, a young messenger, delivers a telegram and then meets with the eldest child, Liesl, outside the villa. He claims he knows what is right for her because he is a year older than she ("Sixteen Going on Seventeen"). They kiss, and he runs off, leaving her squealing with joy. Meanwhile, the housekeeper, Frau Schmidt, gives Maria material to make new clothes, as Maria had given all her possessions to the poor. Maria sees Liesl slipping in through the window, wet from a sudden thunderstorm, but agrees to keep her secret. The other children are frightened by the storm. Maria sings "The Lonely Goatherd" to distract them.

Captain von Trapp arrives a month later from Vienna with Baroness Elsa Schraeder and Max Detweiler. Elsa tells Max that something is preventing the Captain from marrying her. He opines that only poor people have the time for great romances ("How Can Love Survive"). Rolf enters, looking for Liesl, and greets them with "Heil". The Captain orders him away, saying that he is Austrian, not German. Maria and the children leapfrog in, wearing play-clothes that she made from the old drapes in her room. Infuriated, the Captain sends them off to change. She tells him that the children need him to show his love for them, and he angrily orders her back to the abbey. As she apologizes, they hear the children singing "The Sound of Music", which she had taught them, to welcome Elsa Schraeder. He joins in and embraces them. Alone with Maria, he asks her to stay, thanking her for bringing music back into his house. Elsa is suspicious of her until she explains that she will be returning to the abbey in September.

The Captain gives a party to introduce Elsa, and guests argue over the Anschluss (the Nazi German annexation of Austria). Kurt asks Maria to teach him to dance the Ländler. When he fails to negotiate a complicated figure, the Captain steps in to demonstrate. He and Maria dance until they come face-to-face and she breaks away, embarrassed and confused. Discussing the expected marriage between Elsa and the Captain, Brigitta tells Maria that she thinks Maria and the Captain are really in love with each other. Elsa asks the Captain to allow the children to say goodnight to the guests with a song ("So Long, Farewell"). Max is amazed at their talent and wants them for the Kaltzburg Festival, which he is organizing. The guests leave for the dining room, and Maria slips out the front door with her luggage.

At the abbey, Maria says that she is ready to take her monastic vows; but the Mother Abbess realizes that she is running away from her feelings. She tells her to face the Captain and discover if they love each other, and tells her to search for and find the life she was meant to live ("Climb Ev'ry Mountain").

=== Act II ===
Max teaches the children how to sing on stage. When the Captain tries to lead them, they complain that he is not doing it as Maria did. He tells them that he has asked Elsa to marry him. They try to cheer themselves up by singing "My Favorite Things" but are unsuccessful until they hear Maria singing on her way to rejoin them. Learning of the wedding plans, she decides to stay only until the Captain can arrange for another governess. Max and Elsa argue with the Captain about the imminent Anschluss, trying to convince him that it is inevitable ("No Way to Stop It"). When he refuses to compromise on his opposition to it, Elsa breaks off the engagement. Alone, the Captain and Maria finally admit their love, desiring only to be "An Ordinary Couple". As they marry, the nuns reprise "Maria" against the wedding processional.

While Maria and the Captain are on their honeymoon, Max prepares the children to perform at the Kaltzburg Festival. Herr Zeller, the Gauleiter of the region, demands to know why they are not flying the Flag of Nazi Germany now that the Anschluss has occurred. The Captain and Maria return early from their honeymoon before the Festival. In view of the Nazi German occupation, the Captain decides the children should not sing at the event. Max argues that they would sing for Austria, but the Captain points out that it no longer exists. Maria and Liesl discuss romantic love; Maria predicts that in a few years Liesl will be married ("Sixteen Going on Seventeen (Reprise)"). Rolf enters with a telegram that offers the Captain a commission in the German Navy, and Liesl is upset to discover that Rolf is now a committed Nazi. The Captain consults Maria and decides that they must secretly flee Austria. German Admiral von Schreiber arrives to find out why Captain von Trapp has not answered the telegram. He explains that the German Navy holds him in high regard, offers him the commission, and tells him to report immediately to Bremerhaven to assume command. Maria says that he cannot leave immediately, as they are all singing in the Festival concert; and the Admiral agrees to wait.

At the concert, after the von Trapps sing an elaborate reprise of "Do-Re-Mi", Max brings out the Captain's guitar. Captain von Trapp sings "Edelweiss", as a goodbye to his homeland, while using Austria's national flower as a symbol to declare his loyalty to the country. Max asks for an encore and announces that this is the von Trapp family's last chance to sing together, as the honor guard waits to escort the Captain to his new command. While the judges decide on the prizes, the von Trapps sing "So Long, Farewell" (reprise), leaving the stage in small groups. Max then announces the runners-up, stalling as much as possible. When he announces that the first prize goes to the von Trapps and they do not appear, the Nazis start a search. The family hides at the Abbey, and Sister Margaretta tells them that the borders have been closed. Rolf comes upon them and calls out to his lieutenant, but after seeing Liesl, he lets the Captain flee. The Nazis leave, and the von Trapps flee over the Alps as the nuns reprise "Climb Ev'ry Mountain".

== Musical numbers ==
Act I

- "Preludium" – Mother Abbess with Nuns
- "The Sound of Music" – Maria
- "Maria" – Sister Berthe, Sister Sophia, Sister Margaretta, and the Mother Abbess
- "My Favorite Things" – Maria and the Mother Abbess
- "My Favorite Things" (reprise 1) – Maria
- "Do-Re-Mi" – Maria and the children
- "Sixteen Going on Seventeen" – Rolf and Liesl
- "The Lonely Goatherd" – Maria and the children
- "The Lonely Goatherd" (reprise) – Gretl
- "How Can Love Survive" – Max and Elsa
- "The Sound of Music" (reprise) – Maria, the Captain and the children
- "Ländler" (instrumental)
- "So Long, Farewell" – The children
- "Morning Hymn" – Nuns
- "Climb Ev'ry Mountain" – Mother Abbess

Act II

- "My Favorite Things" (reprise 2) – Maria and the children
- "No Way to Stop It" – Elsa, Max and the Captain
- "An Ordinary Couple" – Maria and the Captain †
- "Gaudeamus Domino" – Nuns
- "Maria" (reprise) – Nuns
- "Confitemini Domino" – Nuns
- "Sixteen Going on Seventeen" (reprise) – Maria and Liesl
- "Do-Re-Mi" (reprise) – Maria, the Captain, and the children ‡
- "Edelweiss" – The Captain
- "So Long, Farewell" (reprise) – Maria, the Captain, and the children
- "Finale Ultimo" (reprise of "Climb Every Mountain") – Nuns

Notes

- The musical numbers listed appeared in the original production unless otherwise noted.
- † Sometimes replaced by "Something Good", which was written for the 1965 film version.
- ‡ Replaced by "The Lonely Goatherd" in the 1998 revival.
- In some productions, "My Favorite Things" follows "Sixteen Going on Seventeen" in the thunderstorm scene, while "The Lonely Goatherd" is shifted to the concert scene.
- Many stage revivals have also included "I Have Confidence" and "Something Good", which were written by Richard Rodgers for the film version (since the film was made after original lyricist Oscar Hammerstein's death).
- "Edelweiss" was written for the musical and did not become known in Austria until after the film's success.
- The Ländler dance performed by Maria and the Captain during the party is only loosely based on the traditional Austrian dance of the same name.

== Characters and casts ==
=== Characters ===
- Maria Rainer, a postulant at Nonnberg Abbey
- Captain Georg von Trapp
- The Children:
  - Liesl von Trapp, age 16
  - Friedrich von Trapp, age 14
  - Louisa von Trapp, age 13
  - Kurt von Trapp, age 11
  - Brigitta von Trapp, age 10
  - Marta von Trapp, age 7
  - Gretl von Trapp, age 5
- The Mother Abbess, the head of Nonnberg Abbey
- Baroness Elsa Schraeder, Captain von Trapp's "wealthy and sophisticated" fiancée
- Max Detweiler, Captain von Trapp's friend, a music agent and producer
- Rolf Gruber, the 17-year-old Nazi delivery boy who is in love with Liesl
- Sisters Berthe, Margaretta and Sophia, nuns at the Abbey
- Franz, Captain von Trapp's butler
- Frau Schmidt, Captain von Trapp's housekeeper
- Herr Zeller, the Gauleiter
- Admiral von Schreiber, of the German Navy
- Ensemble of nuns, high-society neighbors of Captain von Trapp, Nazi soldiers and festival concert contestants

=== Original casts ===
Character	Broadway	West End	West End revival	Broadway revival	West End revival
Character	1959	1961	1981	1998	2006
Maria Rainer	Mary Martin	Jean Bayless	Petula Clark	Rebecca Luker	Connie Fisher
Captain Georg von Trapp	Theodore Bikel	Roger Dann	Michael Jayston	Michael Siberry	Alexander Hanson
The Mother Abbess	Patricia Neway	Constance Shacklock	June Bronhill	Patti Cohenour	Lesley Garrett
Baroness Elsa Schraeder	Marion Marlowe	Eunice Gayson	Honor Blackman	Jan Maxwell	Lauren Ward
Max Detweiler	Kurt Kasznar	Harold Kasket	John Bennett	Fred Applegate	Ian Gelder
Liesl von Trapp	Lauri Peters	Barbara Brown	Claire Parker	Sara Zelle	Sophie Bould
Rolf Gruber	Brian Davies	Nicholas Bennett	Paul Shearstone	Dashiell Eaves	Neil McDermott

=== Notable replacements ===
Broadway (1959–63)

- Maria: Martha Wright, Jeannie Carson, Nancy Dussault
- Baroness: Lois Hunt
- Max: Paul Lipson
- Rolf: Jon Voight

Broadway (1998–99)

- Maria: Laura Benanti
- Captain von Trapp: Dennis Parlato, Richard Chamberlain
- Max: Patrick Quinn, Lenny Wolpe

West End (2006–09)

- Maria: Summer Strallen
- Captain von Trapp: Simon Burke, Simon MacCorkindale
- The Mother Abbess: Margaret Preece

== Productions ==
=== Original productions ===
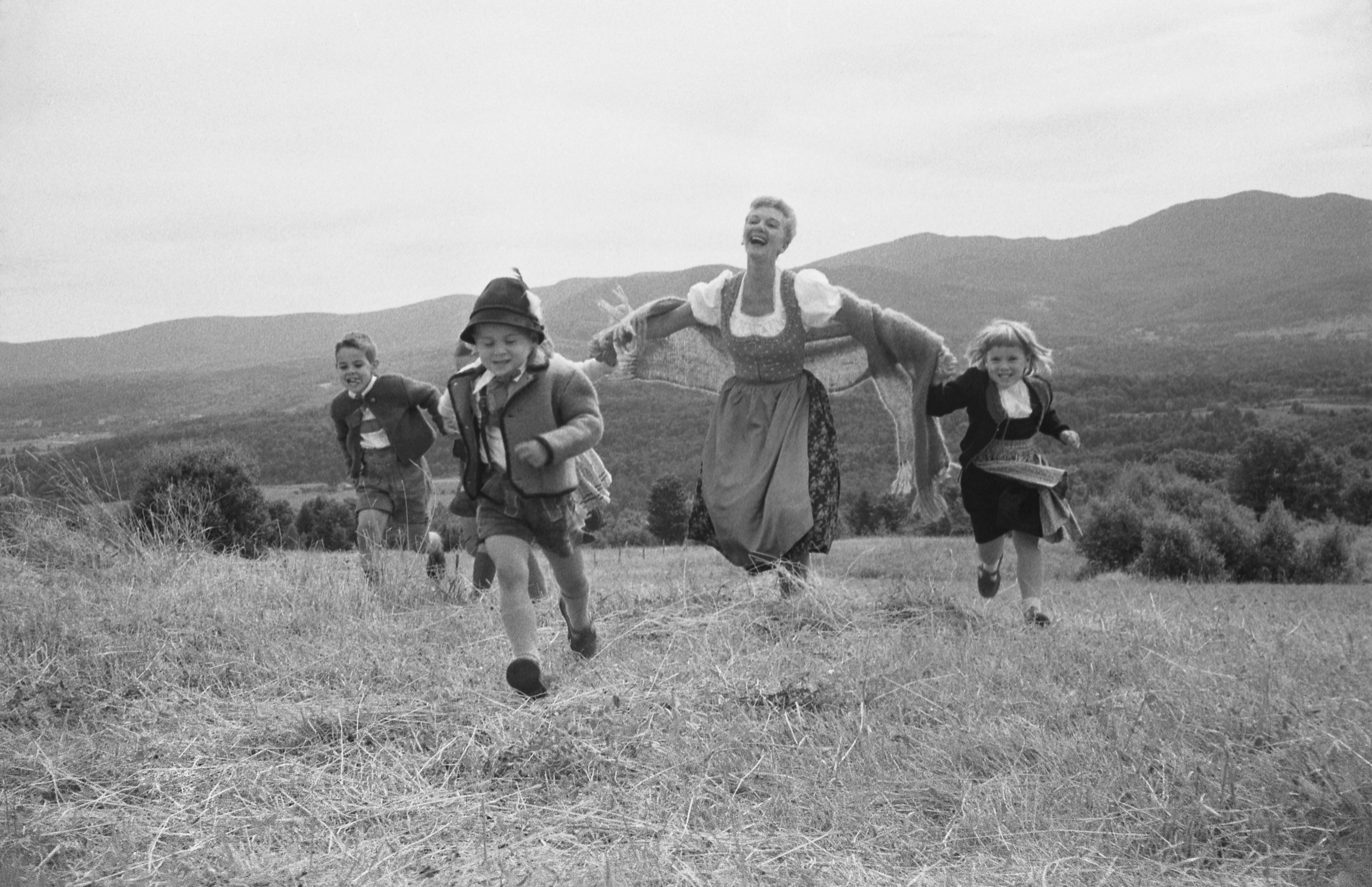
Mary Martin and children in a publicity photo, 1959

The Sound of Music premiered at New Haven's Shubert Theatre where it played an eight-performance tryout in October and November 1959 before another short tryout in Boston. The musical then opened on Broadway at the Lunt-Fontanne Theatre on November 16, 1959, moved to the Mark Hellinger Theatre on November 6, 1962, and closed on June 15, 1963, after 1,443 performances. The director was Vincent J. Donehue, and the choreographer was Joe Layton. The original cast included Mary Martin as Maria, Theodore Bikel as Captain Georg von Trapp, Patricia Neway as Mother Abbess, Kurt Kasznar as Max Detweiler, Marion Marlowe as Elsa Schraeder, Brian Davies as Rolf, Lauri Peters as Liesl and Muriel O'Malley as Sister Margaretta. Patricia Brooks, June Card and Tatiana Troyanos were ensemble members in the original production. The show tied for the Tony Award for Best Musical with Fiorello!. Other awards included Martin for Best Actress in a Musical, Neway for Best Featured Actress, Best Scenic Design (Oliver Smith) and Best Conductor And Musical Director (Frederick Dvonch). Bikel and Kasznar were nominated for acting awards, and Donehue was nominated for his direction. The entire children's cast was nominated for Best Featured Actress category as a single nominee, even though two of the children were boys.

Martha Wright replaced Martin in the role of Maria on Broadway in October 1961, followed by Karen Gantz in July 1962, Jeannie Carson in August 1962 and Nancy Dussault in September 1962. Jon Voight, who later married co-star Lauri Peters, was a replacement for Rolf from September 1961 to June 1962. The national tour starred Florence Henderson as Maria and Beatrice Krebs as Mother Abbess. It opened at the Grand Riviera Theater, Detroit, on February 27, 1961, and closed November 23, 1963, at the O'Keefe Centre, Toronto. Henderson was succeeded by Barbara Meister in June 1962. Theodore Bikel was not satisfied playing the role of the Captain, and Bikel did not like to play the same role over and over again. In his autobiography, he writes: "I promised myself then that if I could afford it, I would never do a run as long as that again."

The musical premiered in London's West End at the Palace Theatre on May 18, 1961, and ran for 2,385 performances. It was directed by Jerome Whyte and used the original New York choreography, supervised by Joe Layton, and the original sets designed by Oliver Smith. The cast included Jean Bayless as Maria, followed by Sonia Rees, Roger Dann as Captain von Trapp, Constance Shacklock as Mother Abbess, Eunice Gayson as Elsa Schraeder, Harold Kasket as Max Detweiler, Barbara Brown as Liesl, Nicholas Bennett as Rolf and Olive Gilbert as Sister Margaretta.

Hammerstein died of stomach cancer on August 23, 1960, nine months after the premiere of The Sound of Music, writing no further musicals.

=== 1981 West End revival ===
In 1981, at producer Ross Taylor's urging, Petula Clark agreed to star in a revival of the show at the Apollo Victoria Theatre in London's West End. Michael Jayston played Captain von Trapp, Honor Blackman was the Baroness and June Bronhill played the Mother Abbess. Other notable cast members included Helen Anker, John Bennett and Martina Grant. Despite her misgivings that, at age 49, she was too old to play the role convincingly, Clark opened to unanimous rave reviews and the largest advance sale in the history of British theatre at that time. Maria von Trapp, who attended the opening night performance, described Clark as "the best" Maria ever. Clark extended her initial six-month contract to thirteen months. Playing to 101 percent of seating capacity, the show set the highest attendance figure for a single week (October 26–31, 1981) of any British musical production in history (as recorded in The Guinness Book of Theatre). It was the first stage production to incorporate the two additional songs ("Something Good" and "I Have Confidence") that Richard Rodgers composed for the film version. "My Favorite Things" had a similar context to the film version, while the short verse "A Bell is No Bell" was extended into a full-length song for Maria and the Mother Abbess. "The Lonely Goatherd" was set in a new scene at a village fair.

=== 1998 Broadway revival ===
Director Susan H. Schulman staged the first Broadway revival of The Sound of Music, with Rebecca Luker as Maria and Michael Siberry as Captain von Trapp. It also featured Patti Cohenour as Mother Abbess, Jan Maxwell as Elsa Schraeder, Fred Applegate as Max Detweiler, Dashiell Eaves as Rolf, Patricia Conolly as Frau Schmidt and Laura Benanti, in her Broadway debut, as Luker's understudy. Later, Luker and Siberry were replaced by Richard Chamberlain as the Captain and Benanti as Maria. Lou Taylor Pucci made his Broadway debut as the understudy for Kurt von Trapp. The production opened on March 12, 1998, at the Martin Beck Theatre, and closed on June 20, 1999, after 533 performances. This production was nominated for a Tony Award for Best Revival of a Musical. It then toured in North America.

=== 2006 West End revival ===
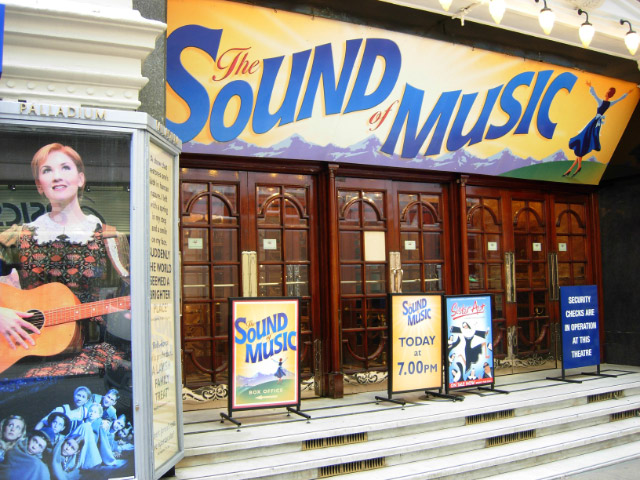
The Sound of Music showing at the London Palladium in 2009

An Andrew Lloyd Webber production opened on November 15, 2006, at the London Palladium, produced by Live Nation's David Ian and Jeremy Sams. Following failed negotiations with Hollywood star Scarlett Johansson, the role of Maria was cast through a UK talent search reality TV show called How Do You Solve a Problem like Maria? The talent show was produced by (and featured) Andrew Lloyd Webber and also featured presenter/comedian Graham Norton and a judging panel of David Ian, John Barrowman and Zoë Tyler.

Connie Fisher was selected by public voting as the winner of the show. In early 2007, Fisher suffered from a heavy cold that prevented her from performing for two weeks. To prevent further disruptions, an alternate Maria, Aoife Mulholland, a fellow contestant on How Do You Solve a Problem like Maria?, played Maria on Monday evenings and Wednesday matinee performances. Simon Shepherd was originally cast as Captain von Trapp, but after two preview performances he was withdrawn from the production, and Alexander Hanson moved into the role in time for the official opening date along with Lesley Garrett as the Mother Abbess. After Garrett left, Margaret Preece took the role. The cast also featured Lauren Ward as the Baroness, Ian Gelder as Max, Sophie Bould as Liesl, and Neil McDermott as Rolf. Other notable replacements included Simon Burke and Simon MacCorkindale as the Captain and newcomer Amy Lennox as Liesl. Summer Strallen replaced Fisher in February 2008, with Mulholland playing Maria on Monday evenings and Wednesday matinees. The revival received enthusiastic reviews, especially for Fisher, Preece, Bould and Garrett. The production closed on February 21, 2009, after a run of over two years and was followed by a UK national tour, described below.

=== 2009 and 2015 UK tours ===
A UK tour began in 2009 and visited more than two dozen cities before ending in 2011. The original cast included Connie Fisher as Maria, Michael Praed as Captain von Trapp and Margaret Preece as the Mother Abbess. Kirsty Malpass was the alternate Maria. Jason Donovan assumed the role of Captain Von Trapp, and Verity Rushworth took over as Maria in early 2011. Lesley Garrett reprised her role as Mother Abbess for the tour's final engagement in Wimbledon in October 2011.

Another UK tour, produced by Bill Kenwright, began in 2015 and toured into 2016. It was directed by Martin Connor and starred Lucy O'Byrne as Maria.

=== 2015 and 2025 North American tours ===
A North American tour, directed by Jack O'Brien and choreographed by Danny Mefford, began at the Ahmanson Theatre in Los Angeles in September 2015. The tour ran until July 2017. Kerstin Anderson played Maria, with Ben Davis as Capt. von Trapp and Ashley Brown as Mother Abbess. The production received warm reviews.

A North American tour began in September 2025. The production is also directed by O'Brien with choreography by Mefford. The cast is led by Cayleigh Capaldi as Maria, Kevin Earley as Captain von Trapp, Christiane Noll as Mother Abbess, Nicholas Rodriguez as Max, Kate Loprest as the baroness, Ariana Ferch as Liesl and Ian Coursey as Rolf.

=== Planned 2027 Broadway revival ===
A revival starring Jasmine Amy Rogers as Maria is scheduled to begin previews on March 23, 2027, and to open on April 15 at the Vivian Beaumont Theater, directed by Lear deBessonet.

=== Other notable productions ===
==== 1960s to 2000 ====
The first Australian production opened at Melbourne's Princess Theatre in 1961 and ran for three years. The production was directed by Charles Hickman, with musical numbers staged by Ernest Parham. The cast included June Bronhill as Maria, Peter Graves as Captain von Trapp and Rosina Raisbeck as Mother Abbess. A touring company then played for years, with Vanessa Lee (Graves' wife) as Maria.

In 1988, the Moon Troupe of Takarazuka Revue performed the musical at the Bow Hall (Takarazuka, Hyōgo). Harukaze Hitomi and Gou Mayuka starred. A 1990 New York City Opera production, directed by Oscar Hammerstein II's son, James, featured Debby Boone as Maria, Laurence Guittard as Captain von Trapp, and Werner Klemperer as Max.

An Australian revival played in the Lyric Theatre, Sydney, New South Wales, from November 1999 to February 2000. Lisa McCune played Maria, John Waters was Captain von Trapp, Bert Newton was Max, Eilene Hannan was Mother Abbess and Rachel Marley was Marta. This production was based on the 1998 Broadway revival staging. The production then toured until February 2001, in Melbourne, Brisbane, Perth and Adelaide. Rachael Beck took over as Maria in Perth and Adelaide, and Rob Guest took over as Captain von Trapp in Perth.

==== 21st century ====
An Austrian production premiered in 2005 at the Volksoper Wien in German. It was directed and choreographed by Renaud Doucet. The cast included Sandra Pires as Maria, Kurt Schreibmayer and Michael Kraus as von Trapp, with Heidi Brunner as Mother Abbess. The song "Do-Re-Mi" was rewritten as "C wie Cellophanpapier", replacing the solfège syllables with the German letter notation C through H and selecting mnemonics that begin with each letter. The production is still in the repertoire of the Volksoper with performances each season; performances are scheduled for 2024.

The Salzburg Marionette Theatre has toured extensively with its version that features the recorded voices of Broadway singers such as Christiane Noll as Maria. The tour began in Dallas, Texas, in 2007 and continued in Salzburg in 2008. The director is Richard Hamburger. In 2008, a Brazilian production with Kiara Sasso as Maria and Herson Capri as the Captain played in Rio de Janeiro and São Paulo, and a Dutch production was mounted with Wieneke Remmers as Maria, directed by John Yost.

Andrew Lloyd Webber, David Ian and David Mirvish presented The Sound of Music at the Princess of Wales Theatre in Toronto from 2008 to 2010. The role of Maria was chosen by the public through a television show, How Do You Solve a Problem Like Maria?, which was produced by Lloyd Webber and Ian and aired in mid-2008. Elicia MacKenzie won and played the role six times a week, while the runner-up in the TV show, Janna Polzin, played Maria twice a week. Captain von Trapp was played by Burke Moses. The show ran for more than 500 performances. It was Toronto's longest running revival ever.

A production ran at the Ópera-Citi theater in Buenos Aires, Argentina in 2011. The cast included Laura Conforte as Maria and Diego Ramos as Captain Von Trapp. A Spanish national tour began in November 2011 at the Auditorio de Tenerife in Santa Cruz de Tenerife in the Canary Islands. The tour visited 29 Spanish cities, spending one year in Madrid's Gran Vía at the Teatro Coliseum, and one season at the Tívoli Theatre in Barcelona. It was directed by Jaime Azpilicueta and starred Silvia Luchetti as Maria and Carlos J. Benito as Captain Von Trapp.

A production was mounted at the Open Air Theatre, Regent's Park from July to September 2013. It starred Charlotte Wakefield as Maria, with Michael Xavier as Captain von Trapp and Caroline Keiff as Elsa. It received enthusiastic reviews and became the highest-grossing production ever at the theatre. In 2014, the show was nominated for Best Musical Revival at the Laurence Olivier Awards and Wakefield was nominated for Best Actress in a Musical.

A brief South Korean production played in 2014. The same year, a Spanish language translation opened at Teatro de la Universidad in San Juan, under the direction of Edgar García. It starred Lourdes Robles as Maria and Braulio Castillo as Captain Von Trapp, with Dagmar as Elsa. A production (in Thai: มนต์รักเพลงสวรรค์) ran at Muangthai ratchadalai Theatre, Bangkok, Thailand, in April 2015 in the Thai language. The production replaced the song "Ordinary couple" with "Something Good".

A 2016 Australian tour of the Lloyd Webber production, directed by Sams, included stops in Sydney, Brisbane, Melbourne and Adelaide. The cast included Amy Lehpamer as Maria, Cameron Daddo as Captain Von Trapp, Marina Prior as Baroness Schraeder and Lorraine Bayly as Frau Schmidt. The choreographer was Arlene Phillips.

== Film and television adaptations ==
On March 2, 1965, 20th Century Fox released a film adaptation starring Julie Andrews as Maria Rainer and Christopher Plummer as Captain Georg von Trapp. It was produced and directed by Robert Wise with the screenplay adaptation written by Ernest Lehman. Two songs were written by Rodgers specifically for the film, "I Have Confidence" and "Something Good". The film won five Oscars at the 38th Academy Awards, including Best Picture.

A live televised production aired twice in December 2013 on NBC. It was directed by Beth McCarthy-Miller and Rob Ashford. Carrie Underwood starred as Maria, with Stephen Moyer as Captain von Trapp, Christian Borle as Max, Laura Benanti as Elsa, and Audra McDonald as the Mother Abbess. The production was released on DVD the same month.

British network ITV presented a live version of its own on December 20, 2015. It starred Kara Tointon as Maria, Julian Ovenden as Captain von Trapp, Katherine Kelly as the Baroness and Alexander Armstrong as Max.

== Reception ==
Most reviews of the original Broadway production were favorable. Richard Watts Jr. of the New York Post stated that the show had "strangely gentle charm that is wonderfully endearing. The Sound of Music strives for nothing in the way of smash effects, substituting instead a kind of gracious and unpretentious simplicity." The New York World-Telegram and Sun pronounced The Sound of Music "the loveliest musical imaginable. It places Rodgers and Hammerstein back in top form as melodist and lyricist. The Lindsay-Crouse dialogue is vibrant and amusing in a plot that rises to genuine excitement." The New York Journal American's review opined that The Sound of Music is "the most mature product of the team ... it seemed to me to be the full ripening of these two extraordinary talents".

Brooks Atkinson of The New York Times gave a mixed assessment. He praised Mary Martin's performance, saying "she still has the same common touch ... same sharp features, goodwill, and glowing personality that makes music sound intimate and familiar" and stated that "the best of the Sound of Music is Rodgers and Hammerstein in good form". However, he said, the libretto "has the hackneyed look of the musical theatre replaced with Oklahoma! in 1943. It is disappointing to see the American musical stage succumbing to the clichés of operetta." Walter Kerr's review in the New York Herald Tribune was unfavorable: "Before The Sound of Music is halfway through its promising chores it becomes not only too sweet for words but almost too sweet for music", stating that the "evening suffer[s] from little children".

== Cast recordings ==
Columbia Masterworks recorded the original Broadway cast album at the Columbia 30th Street Studio in New York City a week after the show's 1959 opening. The album was the label's first deluxe package in a gatefold jacket, priced $1 higher than previous cast albums. It was No. 1 on Billboard's best-selling albums chart for 16 weeks in 1960. It was released on CD from Sony in the Columbia Broadway Masterworks series. In 1959, singer Patti Page recorded the title song from the show for Mercury Records on the day that the musical opened on Broadway. The 1961 London production was recorded by EMI and released on the His Master's Voice label, and later re-issued on CD in 1997, on the Broadway Angel label. The 1961 Australian cast recording was the first time a major overseas production featuring Australian artists was transferred to disc.

The 1965 film soundtrack was released by RCA Victor and is one of the most successful soundtrack albums in history, having sold over 20 million copies worldwide. RCA Victor also released an album of the 1998 Broadway revival produced by Hallmark Entertainment and featuring the full revival cast, including Luker, Siberry, Maxwell and Applegate. The Telarc label made a studio cast recording of The Sound of Music, with the Cincinnati Pops Orchestra conducted by Erich Kunzel (1987). The lead roles went to opera stars: Frederica von Stade as Maria, Håkan Hagegård as Captain von Trapp, and Eileen Farrell as the Mother Abbess. The recording includes "the two new songs written for the film version and the three Broadway songs they replace, as well as a previously unrecorded verse of 'An Ordinary Couple'". The 2006 London revival was recorded and has been released on the Decca Broadway label. There have been numerous studio cast albums and foreign cast albums issued, though many have only received regional distribution. According to the cast album database, there are 62 recordings of the score that have been issued over the years.

The cast recording of the 1981 West End production was the first to be recorded digitally. It was released on CD for the first time in 2010 by the UK label Pet Sounds and included two bonus tracks from the original single issued by Epic to promote the production. A recording of the 2006 London Palladium cast was released. Sony Masterworks released the NBC television cast album in December 2013, starring Underwood, with Moyer, McDonald, Benanti, and Borle.

== Awards and nominations ==
=== Original Broadway production ===
Year	Award ceremony	Category	Nominee	Result
1960	Tony Awards	Best Musical		Won
1960	Tony Awards	Best Actress in a Musical	Mary Martin	Won
1960	Tony Awards	Best Featured Actor in a Musical	Theodore Bikel	Nominated
1960	Tony Awards	Best Featured Actor in a Musical	Kurt Kasznar	Nominated
1960	Tony Awards	Best Featured Actress in a Musical	Patricia Neway	Won
1960	Tony Awards	Best Featured Actress in a Musical	Kathy Dunn, Lauri Peters, Mary Susan Locke, Marilyn Rogers, Evanna Lien, William Snowden, and Joseph Stewart	Nominated
1960	Tony Awards	Best Direction of a Musical	Vincent J. Donehue	Nominated
1960	Tony Awards	Best Conductor and Musical Director	Frederick Dvonch	Won
1960	Tony Awards	Best Scenic Design of a Musical	Oliver Smith	Won
1960	Theatre World Award		Lauri Peters	Won
1967	Outer Critics Circle	Special Award	Constance Towers	Won

=== 1998 Broadway revival ===
Year	Award ceremony	Category	Nominee	Result
1998	Tony Awards	Best Revival of a Musical		Nominated
1998	Drama Desk Awards	Outstanding Orchestrations	Bruce Coughlin	Nominated
1998	Outer Critics Circle Awards	Outstanding Revival of a Musical		Nominated
1998	Outer Critics Circle Awards	Outstanding Actress in a Musical	Rebecca Luker	Nominated
1998	Outer Critics Circle Awards	Outstanding Featured Actress in a Musical	Jan Maxwell	Nominated
1998	Outer Critics Circle Awards	Outstanding Set Design	Heidi Ettinger	Nominated
1998	Drama League Awards	Distinguished Production of a Revival		Nominated
