= No Way to Stop It =

Song
- Published: 1959
- Songwriter(s): Oscar Hammerstein II
- Composer(s): Richard Rodgers

"No Way to Stop It" is a show tune from the 1959 Rodgers and Hammerstein musical The Sound of Music, but not included in the later film version from 1965.

The song features the characters Max Detweiler and Baroness Elsa Schräder, with Captain Georg von Trapp joining in later. It was first performed by Marion Marlowe, Kurt Kasznar and Theodore Bikel.

== Summary ==
Captain von Trapp anticipates the German annexation of Austria, and argues with Elsa and Max about how to respond to the Nazis, who have begun to overrun the country. While the Captain holds Austrian nationalist views and believes he must stand up to the Nazis, Elsa and Max say there is nothing anyone can do, and that the Captain should be flexible and convince the Nazis that he is an ally.

The song shows the three's different motivations and clashes of egos, and becomes a song about Max and Elsa trying to convince Georg to forget about everything going on around him and just to think about himself. The song's circular melody parallels its circular argument. In the end, Georg decides he cannot marry a woman with no political convictions. The song is a turning point in the musical for Captain von Trapp, marking the point where he breaks off his relationship with Elsa, leaving him free to marry Maria.

The song was not used in the film adaptation, where instead the engagement is called off because Elsa is too rich and powerful, wanting an extravagant life in Vienna, and the Captain, who has fallen in love with Maria, wants a simple life in the country. The "political dispute [was essentially replaced] with a solely personal and individual squabble".

== Significance ==
"No Way to Stop It" is one of only two numbers in the play in which Max and Elsa sing. Along with "How Can Love Survive?", which was also cut from the film, it is the only number that addresses her relationship with the Captain.

The satiric, cynical number, which is about "amoral political compromising" (and in fact an anti-protest song), is theorised by Broadway Musicals: A Hundred Year History to be the first-ever rock song to be introduced to a Broadway musical. The book cites its similarity to songs by The Kingston Trio from around that time. The song, along with "How Can Love Survive", was cited in The Oxford Companion to the American Musical: Theatre, Film, and Television as an example of Rodgers and Hammerstein's "wry sense of sophistication".

The American Musical and the Formation of National Identity compares the song to "So What?" from Cabaret, in that they both "articulate [the] general sense of indifference among many constituencies that would eventually allow the Third Reich to expand its influence beyond the point of return". Both these songs include the theme of obsessive circular motion in order to create a sense of inevitability. In the case of "No Way to Stop It", the lyrical motif is the orbit of various satellites, and by the end of the song, it is implied that "I" is the centre of the universe. As a result of "No Way to Stop It" and the duet "How Can Love Survive" (in which the Captain and the Baroness "attempt to work out their competition and the complexities of a dually rich marriage") being cut from the film, class and political tensions are eliminated, secondary characters become less complex, and Maria and the children become most of the film's focus.

Broadway Musicals: A Hundred Year History refers to the song as a "gem".

Cambridge Guide to American Theatre described both No Way to Stop It and How Can Love Survive? as having "ironic wit".
