= Sixteen Going on Seventeen =

Song
- Published: 1959
- Songwriter: Oscar Hammerstein II
- Composer: Richard Rodgers

"Sixteen Going on Seventeen" is a show tune from the 1959 Rodgers and Hammerstein musical The Sound of Music.

== Background ==
The lyrics of the song state that Liesl is a young girl at the beginning of her womanhood, and that she can depend on Rolf for guidance since he is one year older. Since the comparative maturity of the two characters is the opposite of that expressed in the song, this is an example of lyrical irony.

A reprise of "Sixteen Going on Seventeen" is also sung by Maria and Liesl when the Captain and Maria came back from their honeymoon and Rolf has rejected Liesl. In the stage version, there is an introduction to the reprise for Maria to sing. This quatrain was originally written as the verse intro to Climb Ev'ry Mountain but reassigned to the Sixteen Going on Seventeen reprise later on. It was cut from the film, but included on reissues of the soundtrack recording.

In the movie version, the song was filmed in and around a gazebo, which is still visited by hundreds of tourists each day doing "Sound of Music" tours around Salzburg, even though the gazebo interiors were filmed in Hollywood. When Daniel Truhitte and Charmian Carr performed in the song, the latter was actually 21 years old when the song was filmed.

== In popular culture ==
The song was reimagined by Dawn French and Jennifer Saunders in an episode of their sketch show French and Saunders where, as one of several sketches based on the movie, the two sit in the gazebo singing the lyrics: "I am French/And you are Saunders".

The song was used as the outro music for "Tea Leaves," a fifth-season episode of the US television series Mad Men.

The song was used in the 1996 British film Beautiful Thing. On the second night they share a bed, Jamie kisses Ste for the first time, and the song is heard playing at the end of the scene. The song continues playing through to the following scenes.

On May 4, 2000, Julia Louis-Dreyfus was a guest on the Late Show with David Letterman, ending her visit on the show by performing a rendition of the song with fellow Seinfeld co-star Jerry Seinfeld.

Laibach did a cover of the song for their "The Sound of Music" album, which was inspired by their 2015 tour in North Korea.

In the To All the Boys I've Loved Before book series by Jenny Han, the main character Lara Jean sings the song with her father throughout the book.
