= Ed Mirvish Theatre =

Theatre in Toronto, Canada

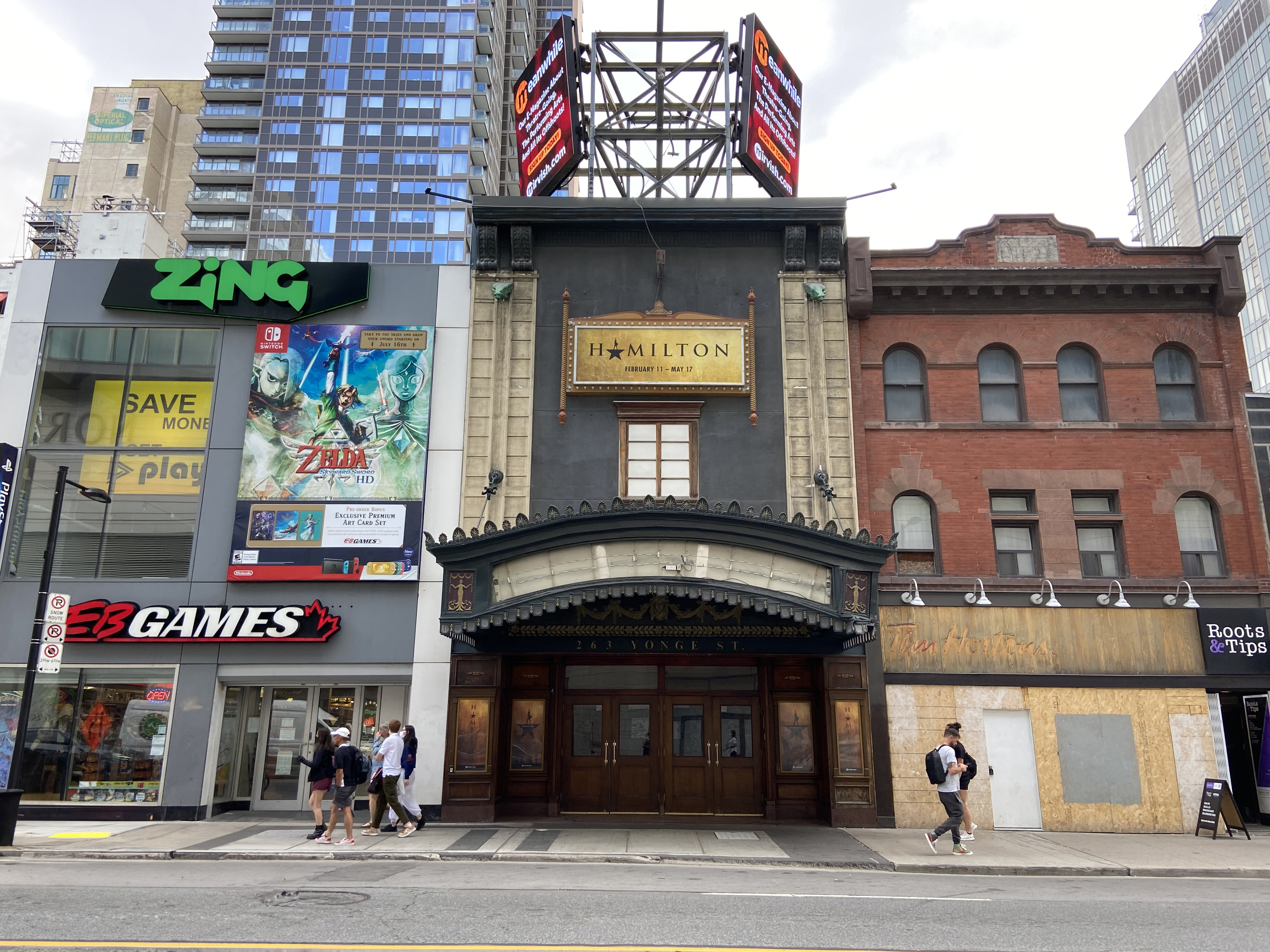
- Yonge Street Entrance in September 2021
- Interactive map of Ed Mirvish Theatre
- Former names: Pantages Theatre (1920-1930, 1989-2001); Imperial Theatre (1930-1973); Imperial Six (1973-1987); Canon Theatre (2001-2011); Ed Mirvish Theatre (2011-2021); CAA Ed Mirvish Theatre (2021-present)
- Address: 244 Victoria Street; Toronto, Ontario; M5B 1V8
- Coordinates: 43°39′18″N 79°22′47″W
- Owner: Mirvish Productions
- Capacity: 2300
- Public transit: TMU station

Construction
- Opened: 1920
- Rebuilt: 1972, 1989
- Architects: Thomas W. Lamb (1920); Mandel Sprachman (1972 renovation); David K. Mesbur (1989 renovation)

Website
- www.mirvish.com/visit/theatres/caa-ed-mirvish-theatre

Ontario Heritage Act
- Designated: June 13, 1988

The Ed Mirvish Theatre (branded as the CAA Ed Mirvish Theatre for naming rights reasons) is a historic performing arts theatre in Toronto, Ontario, located in the Garden District, near Sankofa Square. Owned and operated by Mirvish Productions, the theatre has approximately 2,300 seats across two levels. There are two entrances to the theatre, located at 263 Yonge Street and 244 Victoria Street.

Opened in August 1920, the theatre was designed by Thomas W. Lamb to host vaudeville performances and films. The theatre was originally named the Pantages Theatre, after its first manager and theatre magnate Alexander Pantages (1867–1936). From 1930 to 1973, the theatre was named the Imperial Theatre, and, following the 1973 multiplex renovations, was renamed the Imperial Six. In 1989, the original Pantages Theatre name was restored, until 2001 when it was renamed the Canon Theatre under a naming rights agreement. In 2011, after the theatre was acquired by Mirvish Productions, it was renamed the Ed Mirvish Theatre. The name was amended to the CAA Ed Mirvish Theatre in 2021 as part of a naming rights agreement with the regional chapter of the Canadian Automobile Association (CAA).

== History ==
In the early 1900s, theatre magnate Alexander Pantages had steadily built many vaudeville theatres, which became known as the Pantages Theatre Circuit. By 1920, Pantage's entertainment company had owned as many as 30 theaters and controlled several others. All of these venues were located across the western United States and western Canada. Seeking to expand into eastern Canada, Pantages became interested in building a vaudeville venue in Toronto. The Toronto theatre was the easternmost house of the Pantages Theatre Circuit.

=== Development and early years ===
The venue, which was named the Pantages Theatre, was designed by theatre architect Thomas W. Lamb and was the largest cinema in Canada at the time (originally 3,373 seats). Although construction of the theatre was commissioned by Famous Players founder Nathan L. Nathanson, Pantages managed and booked performances for the venue.

The Pantages Theatre officially opened on August 28, 1920 as a combination vaudeville and motion picture venue. During the first week of the theatre's opening, there were six acts that performed, which included Sick Abed, High and Dizzy, and On the High Seas.

By 1929, Pantages was involved in a highly publicized legal battle, in which he was charged with the rape of a 17-year-old actress named Eunice Pringle. Pantages was originally convicted and sentenced to 50 years in prison, but his conviction was overturned on appeal. Despite this, the scandal and legal costs severely harmed Pantages. As a result, he was forced to sell his theatres and other assets.

=== Famous Players ownership ===
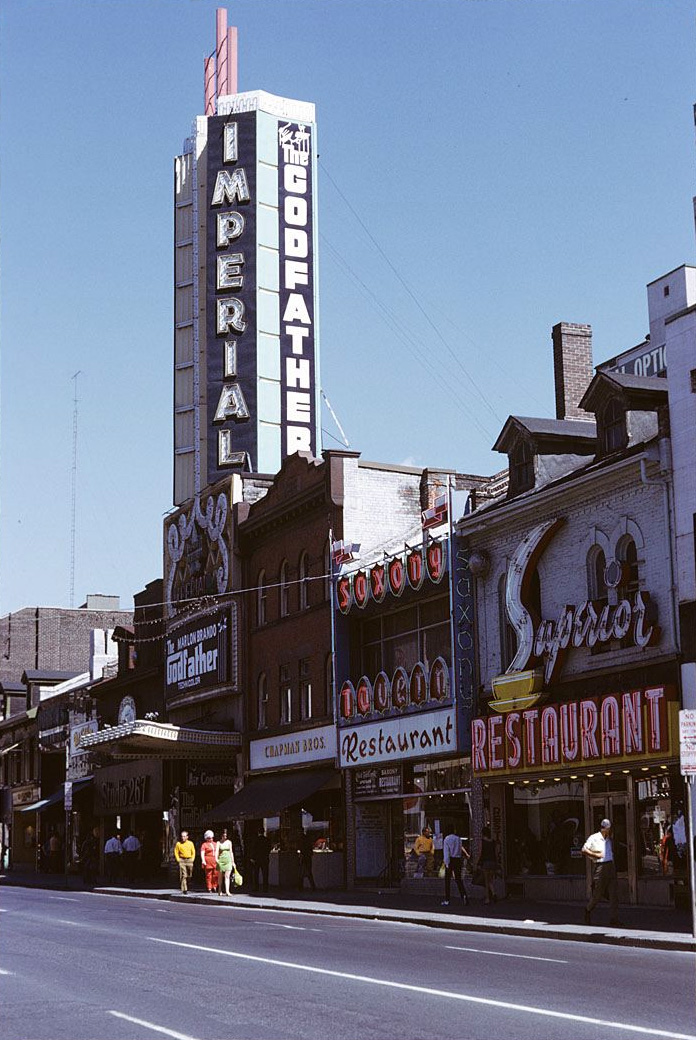
The Imperial, during the 1972 run of The Godfather, prior to the cinema's conversion to a multiplex

In 1930, Famous Players assumed complete control of the venue. The theatre was renamed the Imperial Theatre, and began only showing movies. This continued until 1972, when the Imperial Theatre closed for renovations. The final movie that played at the theatre was The Godfather.

==== Multiplex theatre renovations ====
In 1972, the Imperial Theatre underwent renovations to be divided into six separate cinemas. The design was managed by Toronto architect Mandel Sprachman.

In the theatre, much of the interior was retained while dividing the theatre into six cinemas:

- Cinema 1: Built starting at the edge of the balcony, extending out towards the top half of the stage's proscenium arch
- Cinema 2: Located on the original balcony
- Cinema 3: Built in the original stage house, in a loft above the stage.
- Cinema 4: Built in the original stage house, on the stage. Located underneath Cinema 3, with both Cinemas 3 and 4 being accessed by a long glass walkway that ran the length of the building exterior above Victoria Street.
- Cinemas 5 & 6: Located in the original main floor (orchestra) seating area, divided in half by a partition wall.

In addition, the gold leaf and faux marble balustrades were painted over with bolder colours - yellow, red, blue, black, and silver. The walls were now carpeted in red and blue.

On the exterior, the Yonge St. façade was replaced with a new aluminum-paneled front signage without a canopy. The sign featured a large circle opening above the entrance, into a brightly lit open outdoor square with bright modern marquee panels above on three sides. There were six television screens airing movie trailers on each side leading to the entrance doors. However, these television screens were later replaced by poster cases due to visibility problems with sunlight washing out the TV screens and technical problems.

==== 1973 to 1986 ====
In 1973, Mayor David Crombie officially re-opened the venue. Following the renovations, the theatre was renamed the Imperial Six.

Throughout the 1970s and into the early 1980s, the Imperial Six was a financial success for Famous Players. The theatre played all of the big theatrical releases, which included all of the James Bond and Rocky movie releases.

=== Divided ownership ===
The Imperial Six was located on three separate lots, with two different owners. Famous Players owned the Yonge Street entrance, which bridged an alley and connected to the main building on Victoria Street, and they also owned the front half of the main theatre building, from the centre of the dome to the back wall of the stage house. However, the other half of the main theatre building, from the centre of the dome to the north wall of the main lobby, was leased from Edna Rakas, whose family had owned this section of the property prior to the venue's original construction in 1920.

On May 24, 1986, Famous Players had accidentally allowed their lease on Rakas' part of the property to expire. Rakas rebuffed Famous Players' attempts to renegotiate the lease at a rate that was more favourable to the company. Famous Players were convinced that any other company would not be interested in owning only "half a theatre". Shortly thereafter, Rakas approached Famous Players' main rival, Cineplex Odeon with an offer to take over the lease.

On May 30, 1986, Cineplex CEO Garth Drabinsky met with Rakas and quickly signed the lease. The following day, Cineplex Odeon seized control of their part of the Imperial Six building. This effectively locked Famous Players out of the theatre offices, some of the projection booths, and some of the cinemas. The Supreme Court of Ontario dismissed Famous Players' application of an injunction blocking Cineplex Odeon's lease on June 2, 1986.

Since Cineplex Odeon lacked an entrance on Yonge Street, the company considered gutting their half of the building and creating a new multiplex cinema. However, Cineplex Odeon quickly dropped these plans to preserve the grand lobby, staircase, and other parts of the existing interior. Instead, a plan was made to create a single-screen 800-seat cinema with its own entrance on Victoria Street.

On December 11, 1987, Cineplex Odeon opened the Pantages Cinema. The first film that played at the theatre was Wall Street, starring Michael Douglas and Charlie Sheen.

Meanwhile, the lapse of the lease caused tumult within Famous Players, with long-time President George Destounis being ousted. Famous Players continued to run movies out of the cinemas that they were still able to access at the venue. After Famous Players complained about a fire risk posed by the renovations made by Cineplex Odeon, Toronto building commissioner Michael Nixon imposed a stay on all activities in the theatre on December 7, 1987; the next day, however, District Court Judge Drew Hudson said renovations and planned opening could go ahead with the approval of the Toronto Fire Department. However, on the theater's planned premiere night, December 10, 1987, approximately 500 people, mainly Cineplex Odeon employees and stockbrokers, saw dozens of workmen file In and out of the lobby with electrical equipment and tools, bricklayers scrambling up scaffolding on the outside of the building with buckets of wet cement and a number of city officials, policemen and lawyers marching back and forth from the theatre to a parking lot in Victoria Street. Eventually, an inspection from the Toronto Fire Marshal John Bateman forced the shuttering of the theatre, declaring "it's not ready. The exits are the main problem. There aren't enough of them. No one can go in there tonight." Drabinsky then redirected guests to the nearby Varsity theatre for the Wall Street screening. The theatre installed a complete set of exits the next day, and Drabinsky decided, afterward, to open the theatre at 6 PM.

After the opening, Famous Players then filed to have its portion of the former Imperial Six theater demolished; the request was denied by the Toronto Historical Board, which wanted it preserved.

=== Livent ownership ===
==== Live theatre renovations ====
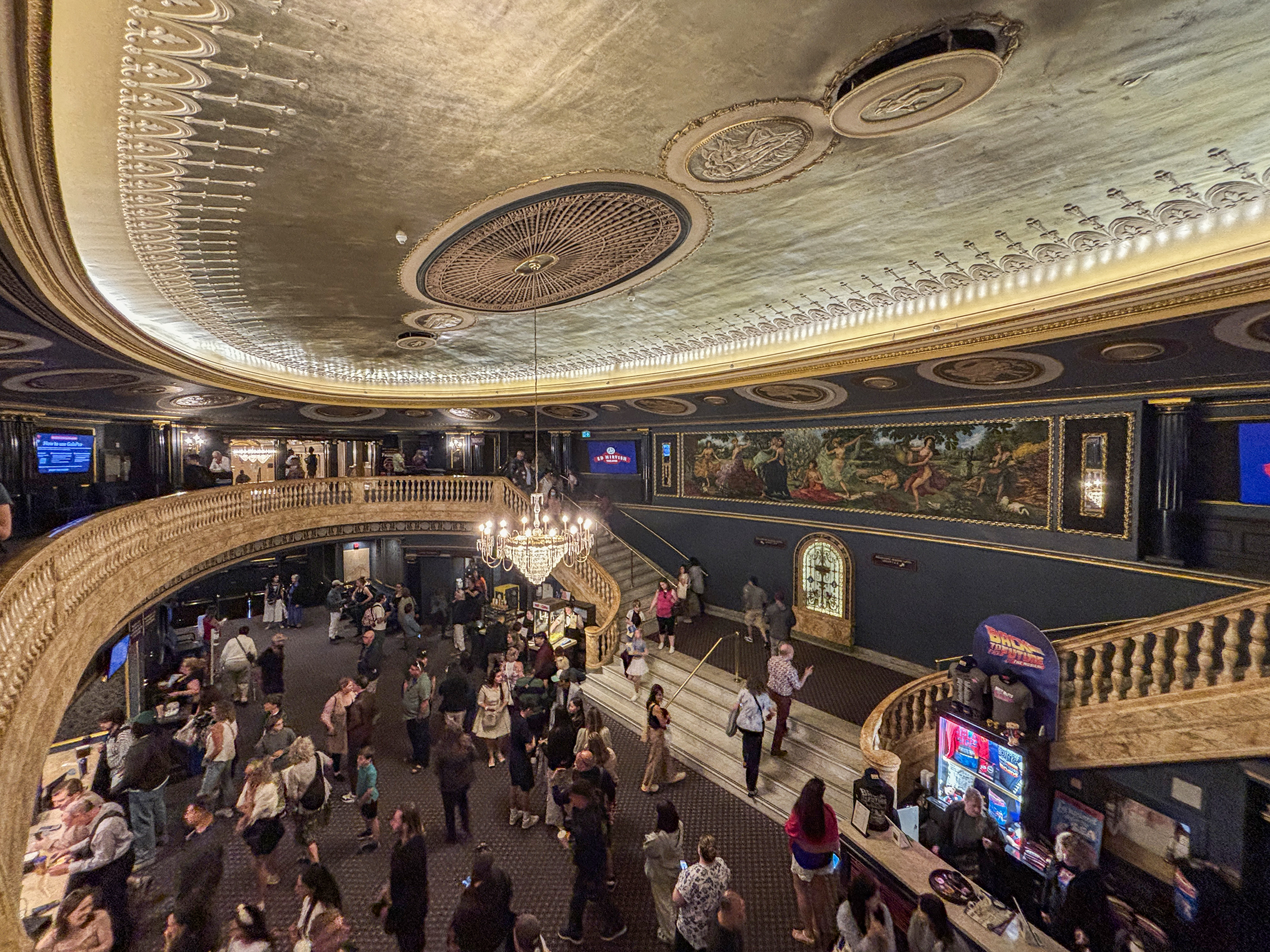
Theatre Lobby

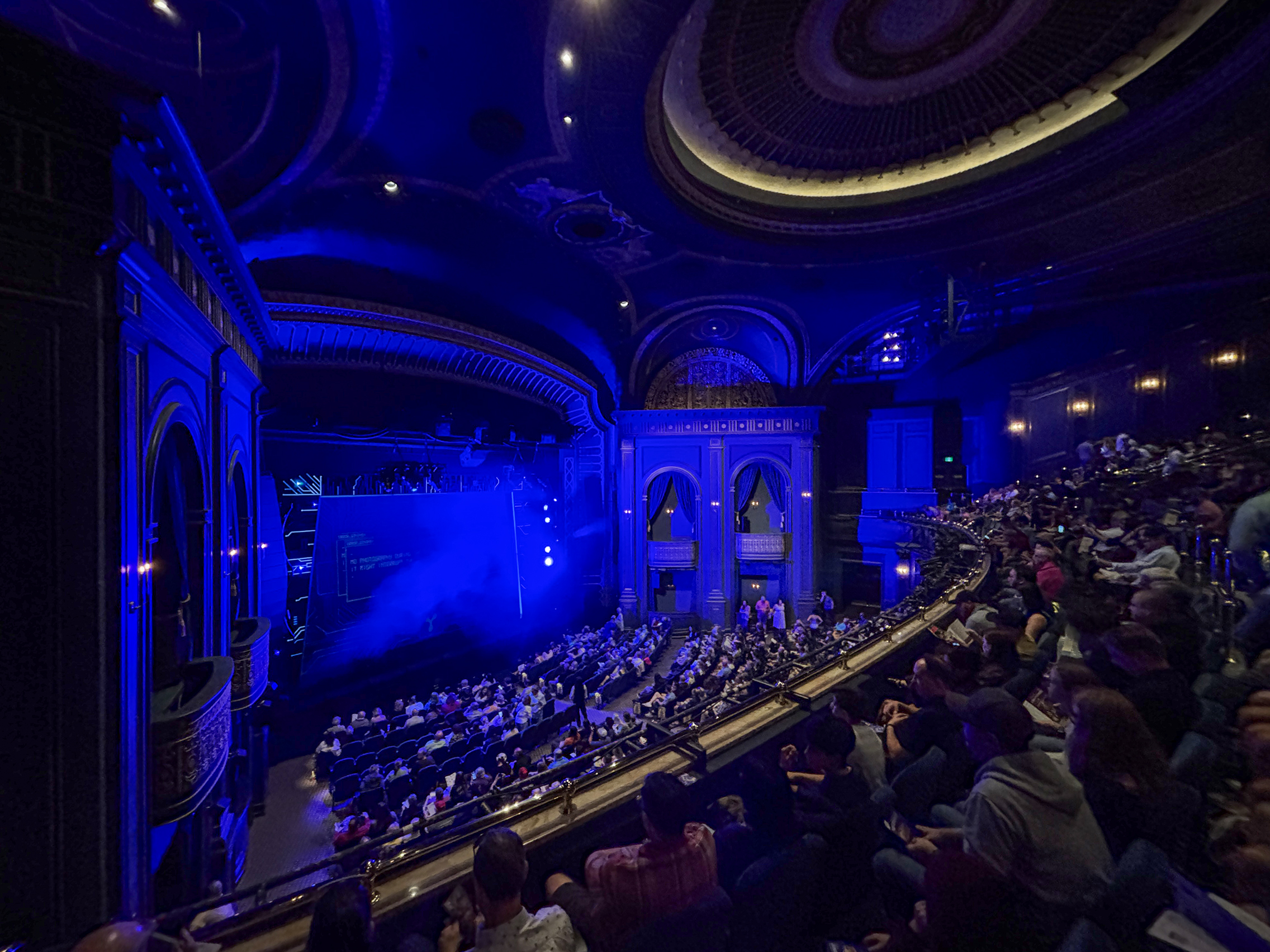
Theatre inside

In August 1988, Famous Players agreed to sell their portions of the property (including the Yonge Street entrance) to Cineplex Odeon, on the condition that Cineplex Odeon never again present a film at the theatre. As a result, the last film to ever play at the Pantages Cinema was Die Hard, starring Bruce Willis. The theatre was closed on August 25, 1988.

Ousted from Cineplex Odeon, Garth Drabinsky and Myron Gottlieb retained control of the theatre's property and created their own theatrical production company, Livent. Once the venue was closed, Drabinsky underwent plans to completely restore the theatre back to its original 1920 look. Drabinsky wanted to create another Toronto venue that could attract big successful Broadway shows to Toronto, such as the successful run that Cats had enjoyed earlier in the 1980s.

The architect for the 1988-1989 renovation was David K. Mesbur. Interior demolition work removed all the 1973 partition walls, floors, fire exits and passageways. The basement underneath the original theatre floor was excavated to allow for deeper below grade spaces to accommodate modern live theatre amenities. All of the original plasterwork, some of which had been hidden behind drywall during the 1973 renovation, was restored. Architects and designers carefully ensured they were replicating the original design to restore the theatre, which including recreating the grand staircase, Yonge Street ticket box, and the marquee and canopy on Yonge Street.

In 1989, the original Pantages Theatre name was restored, with a seating capacity of 2,200.

==== 1980s and 1990s ====
On September 20, 1989, the theatre officially re-opened. The theatre's first legitimate live theatrical production was the Canadian premiere of Andrew Lloyd Webber's musical The Phantom of the Opera. The musical's original cast starred Colm Wilkinson as The Phantom and Rebecca Caine as Christine Daaé. In 1999, Kiss lead singer Paul Stanley played The Phantom for several months, until the show's closing.

On April 13, 1998, Drabinsky stepped down as CEO of Livent. He was replaced in the role by Michael Ovitz, who now owned a controlling stake in the company. After finding what were considered "serious accounting irregularities", Drabinsky and Gottlieb were suspended and Livent was forced to file for bankruptcy protection.

On October 31, 1999, the Canadian production of The Phantom of the Opera closed at the Pantages Theatre. The show played for over a decade and 4,226 performances.

In 1999, Livent was forced to sell its assets, and Clear Channel Entertainment purchased the Pantages Theatre.

=== Live Nation ownership ===
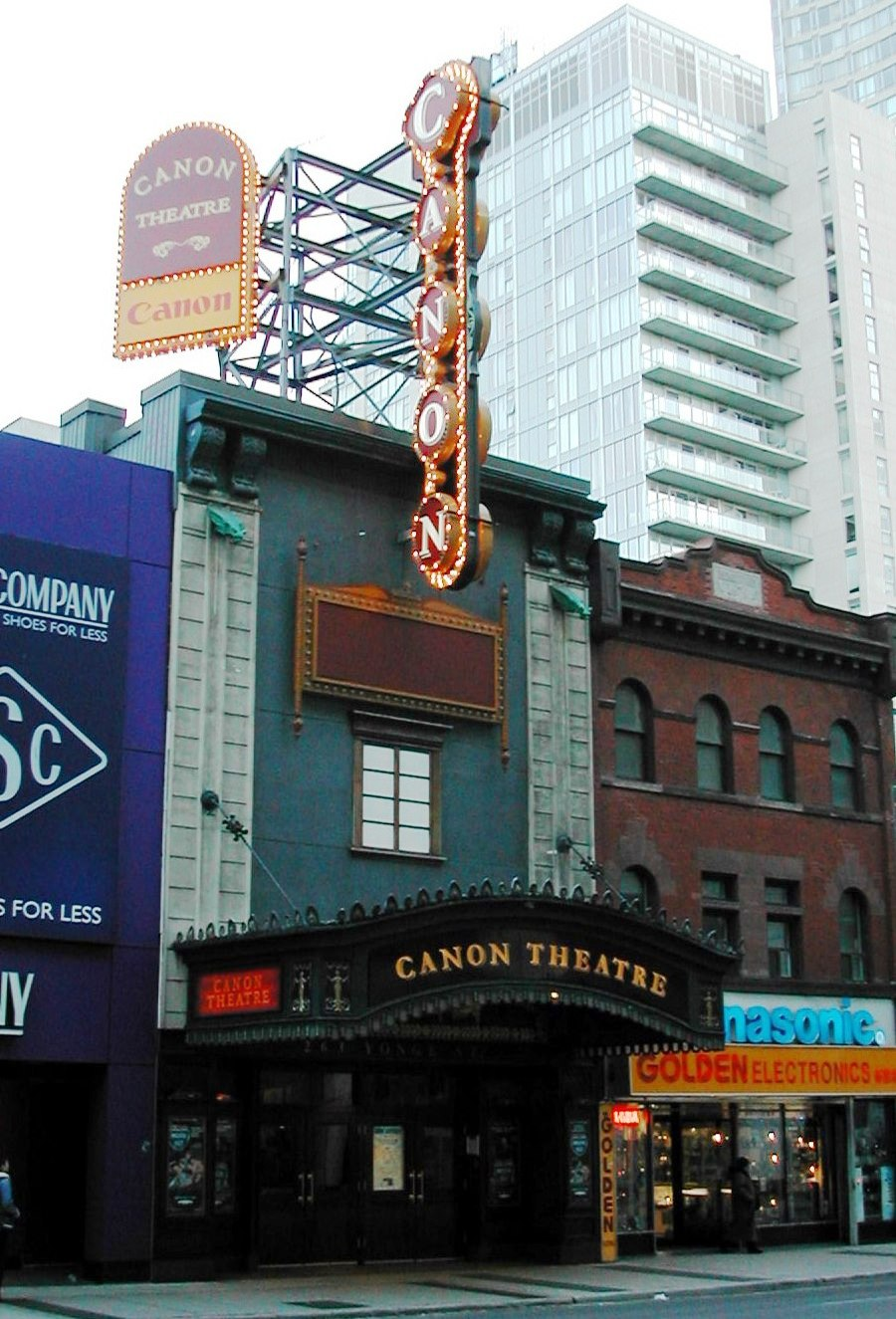
Canon Theatre, November 2005

Once the sale was completed, Clear Channel Entertainment assigned ownership of the Pantages Theatre to its subsidiary, Live Nation, owners of Broadway Across Canada and Broadway Across America.

After unsuccessfully attempting to run a theatrical subscription series at the theatre, Mirvish Productions entered into a lease agreement with Live Nation in 2001. This agreement allowed Mirvish to present productions at the venue and awarded him naming rights to the theatre. A key part of the agreement was that the deal gave Mirvish Productions the right of first negotiation should the theatre ever be put up for sale.

In September 2001, Mirvish Productions started its tenancy at the theatre, which then became known as the Canon Theatre as part of a naming rights agreement with Canon Inc.. The first production presented was a touring production ofSaturday Night Fever, which played at the theatre between September 5 and October 14, 2001.

=== Key Brand Entertainment purchase and sale ===
On January 24, 2008, Key Brand Entertainment, owned by British theatre producer John Gore, announced that it had acquired all of Live Nation's North American theatrical assets. Under the terms of the financial agreement, Key Brand Entertainment placed both the Canon Theatre as well as the nearby Panasonic Theatre up for sale. This triggered Mirvish's legal right to make an offer to purchase the theatres, which the company did successfully in April 2008.

This sale prompted Aubrey Dan, owner of rival Toronto theatrical company Dancap Productions and minority shareholder in Key Brand Entertainment, to seek an injunction blocking the sale. On August 19, 2008, the request for an injunction was dismissed.

By September 2008, Mirvish Productions formally closed a deal to purchase both theatres from Key Brand Entertainment.

=== Mirvish Productions ownership ===
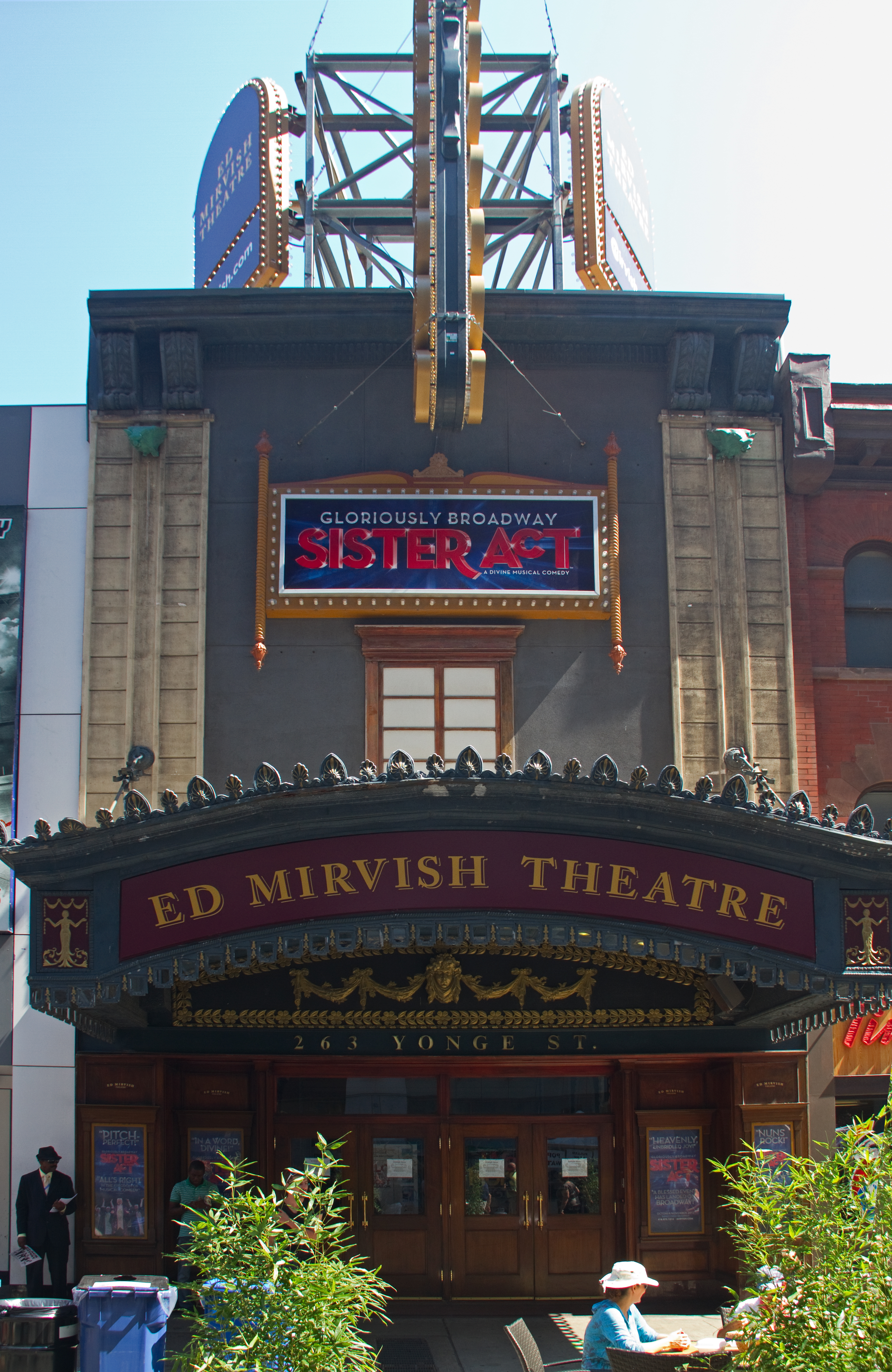
Ed Mirvish Theatre, September 2012

==== 2010s ====
On December 6, 2011, following the expiration of Canon's sponsorship, the theatre was renamed the Ed Mirvish Theatre in honour of Mirvish Productions co-founder Ed Mirvish, who had died in 2007.

In February 2017, plans were announced to relocate the iconic signage of Honest Ed's—a former downtown department store that Mirvish had also owned—to the façade at the 244 Victoria St. entrance of the theatre, pending approval from the City of Toronto and further restoration of the sign. The plans have since been delayed indefinitely, after it was found that the signage was in poor condition, and was too heavy to be installed on the theatre's walls.

==== 2020s ====
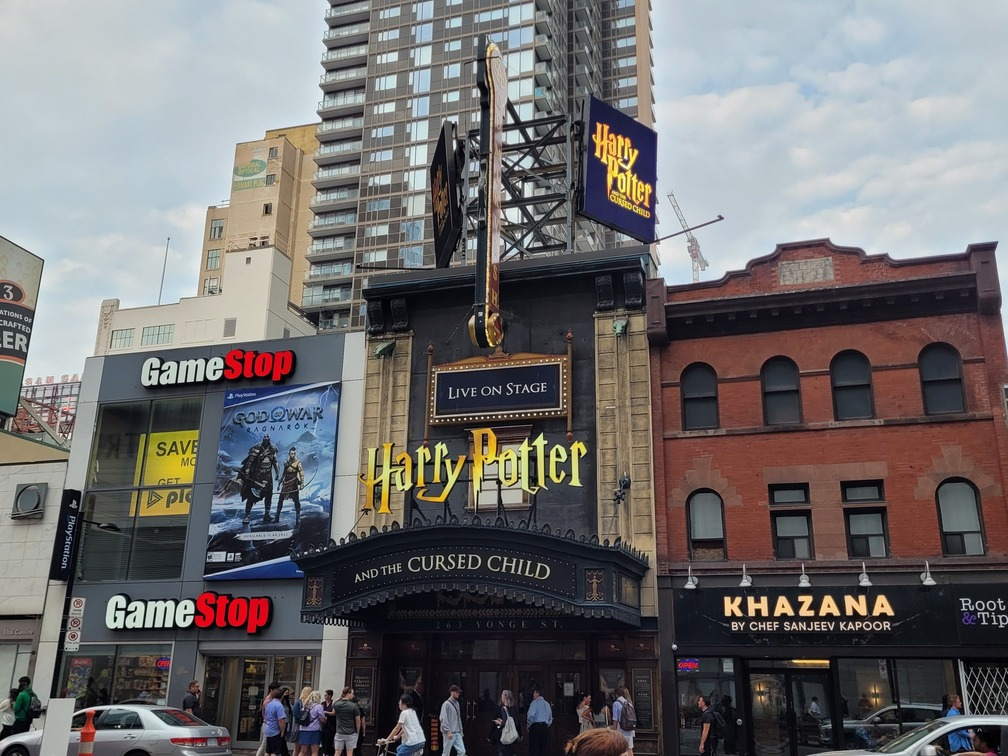
Harry Potter and the Cursed Child, September 2022

On February 11, 2020, the Canadian premiere of the popular Lin-Manuel Miranda musical Hamilton opened at the Ed Mirvish Theatre. However, the show's run was abruptly ended on March 14, 2020, when theatres were closed because of the COVID-19 pandemic.

In September 2021, Mirvish Productions renewed a sponsorship agreement with CAA South Central Ontario for the CAA Theatre. The sponsorship included naming rights to the Ed Mirvish Theatre, renaming it the CAA Ed Mirvish Theatre. The agreement also allowed for CAA-branded lounges at Mirvish's properties, as well as promotions for CAA members. Theatre critic J. Kelly Nestruck criticized the agreement for resulting in two similarly-named venues with a likelihood of confusion, arguing the new name had made Toronto "the most confusing theatre city in Canada".

On May 31, 2022, the Ed Mirvish Theatre re-opened with the Canadian production of Harry Potter and the Cursed Child. The theatre underwent an estimated $5 million renovation to transform it into an intimate theatre for the open-ended run of the play. The renovations included new faux walls, seating, repainted walls and added decor to create an immersive theatrical environment. The renovation project was led by Toronto-based architect Athos Zaghi.

== Heritage designations ==
On October 1, 1979, the City of Toronto listed the property on the City of Toronto Heritage Property Inventory. This designation preserves the original facades and exterior appearance of the property.

On June 13, 1988, the property was designated under Part IV of the Ontario Heritage Act, resulting in heritage protection for the theatre.

== Notable productions ==
Productions are listed by the year of their first performance.

=== Pantages Theatre ===
- 1989: The Phantom of the Opera
- 2000: Rent, Dame Edna: The Royal Tour
- 2001: Cinderella, Fame, Cabaret

=== Canon Theatre ===
- 2001: Saturday Night Fever
- 2002: The Graduate, Cats, Arturo Brachetti, Contact
- 2003: Aida, Chicago, Jesus Christ Superstar, The Producers
- 2004: The Rat Pack
- 2005: Wicked, Movin' Out
- 2006: Cirque Eloize: Nomade, Martin Short: Fame Becomes Me, Spamalot, Wicked
- 2007: We Will Rock You
- 2008: Spamalot, A Chorus Line, Chitty Chitty Bang Bang
- 2009: Medea, The Color Purple, Spring Awakening, Riverdance, The Harder They Come, August: Osage County, Fiddler on the Roof
- 2010: Little House on the Prairie, Grease, Cats, Wicked, A Funny Thing Happened on the Way to the Forum, Rent
- 2011: Billy Elliot the Musical, Fela!

=== Ed Mirvish Theatre ===
- 2012: Bring It On, Sister Act, Jekyll & Hyde, The Wizard of Oz
- 2013: Aladdin
- 2014: Heartbeat of Home, Wicked, Jersey Boys
- 2015: Once, Newsies, Cinderella
- 2016: Gas Light, The Judas Kiss, Matilda
- 2017: The Bodyguard, Beautiful: The Carole King Musical, Bat Out of Hell: The Musical
- 2018: Annie, Wicked, Bat Out of Hell: The Musical, School of Rock
- 2019: The Play That Goes Wrong, Waitress, The Band's Visit, Anastasia
- 2020: Hamilton
- 2022: Harry Potter and the Cursed Child
- 2023: In Dreams, To Kill a Mockingbird, Ain't Too Proud
- 2024: National Ballet of Ukraine, Hadestown, To Kill a Mockingbird, Tina, Life of Pi, Mamma Mia, Moulin Rouge!
- 2025: Just for One Day, Life After, Beetlejuice, Back to the Future, MJ the Musical, We Will Rock You
- 2026: Some Like It Hot
