= Colonial Theatre (Boston) =

Theater in Boston, Massachusetts

Coordinates: 42.352296°N 71.065428°W

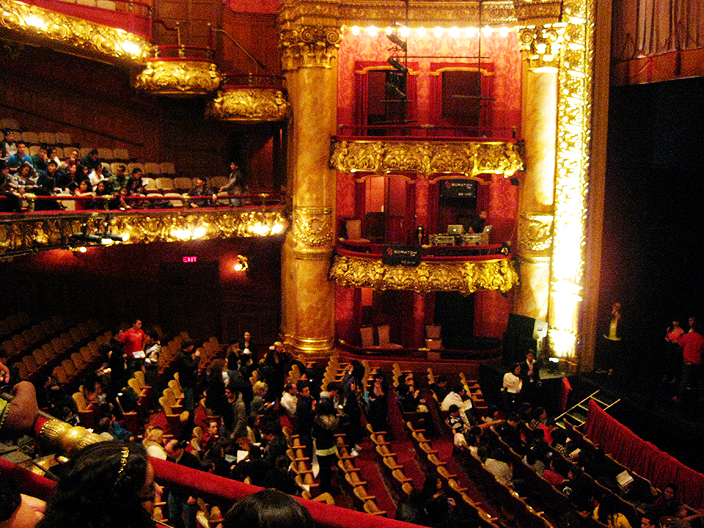
- The Colonial Theatre, Boston, 2009
- Interactive map of Colonial Theatre
- Address: 106 Boylston Street; Boston, Massachusetts; United States
- Owner: Emerson College
- Operator: ATG Entertainment
- Capacity: 1,700

Construction
- Opened: December 20, 1900
- Rebuilt: 1960, 1995

Website
- us.atgtickets.com/venues/emerson-colonial-theatre/whats-on/

The Colonial Theatre in Boston, Massachusetts, opened in 1900, is the oldest continually-operating theatre in the city. It is located at 106 Boylston Street on Boston Common at the former site of the Boston Public Library's central branch. It is a pending Boston Landmark.

== History ==
The Colonial Theatre was designed by the architectural firm of Clarence Blackall and paid for by Frederick Lothrop Ames Jr. The theatre first opened its doors for a performance of Ben-Hur on December 20, 1900 with a sold out show and Winston Churchill attending. Ben-Hur operated with a cast and crew of 350 people and featured eight live horses on stage in full gallop during the chariot race scene. The play was so mechanically and technically extraordinary it was featured on the cover of Scientific American.

George Bernard Shaw's play Too True To Be Good received its world premiere at the Colonial Theatre on February 29, 1932.

=== Recent history ===
In the 1990s, Colonial president Jon Platt led a renovation of the Colonial. In 1998, Platt sold his Boston theater interests to SFX Entertainment (now Live Nation). In 2003, Emerson College leased the building with an option to purchase it.

In 2006, Emerson invoked its purchase option with the intent of using the upper floors for dormitories. In 2008, Key Brand Entertainment purchased most of Live Nation's theatrical assets, including its lease on the Colonial Theatre. When KBE's lease ended, the Citi Performing Arts Center assumed operation of the venue and continued booking in partnership with KBE.

Through the succession of operators until 2015, the Colonial Theater housed Pre-Broadway shows and was often the first stop for national tours of Broadway shows. Because of its size, the Colonial can often host highly technical musicals that the smaller houses, such as the Shubert and the Wilbur Theatres, cannot accommodate. The Colonial has also played host to much larger shows such as Les Misérables, but after the renovation of the newly restored Boston Opera House, some of its typical shows performed elsewhere. Nonetheless, the Colonial continued to be a testing ground for Broadway-bound shows.

When the Citi lease ended October 15, 2015, Emerson College closed the Colonial to evaluate the use of the structure. Later, the school announced plans to convert the theatre space into a dining hall. After protests from faculty, alumni, historians and theatrical personnel, and over 7,000 signatures on a Change.org petition, including playwright/composer Stephen Sondheim and New York Times theatre critic, Frank Rich, Emerson President M. Lee Pelton announced on March 3, 2016, that the college would instead renovate another building into a dining hall and gathering area and seek to bring live performances back to the Colonial.

In September 2016, Emerson College administration announced it was considering plans from various outside groups to reopen the theater. One of the proposals was from a local consortium, which included Live Nation, the Boston Lyric Opera, Broadway in Boston, and Celebrity Series of Boston with the consortium bringing Broadway shows, musical acts, opera, and more to the theater. There were also proposals internally from the college and from SMG, a Pennsylvania-based venue management group.

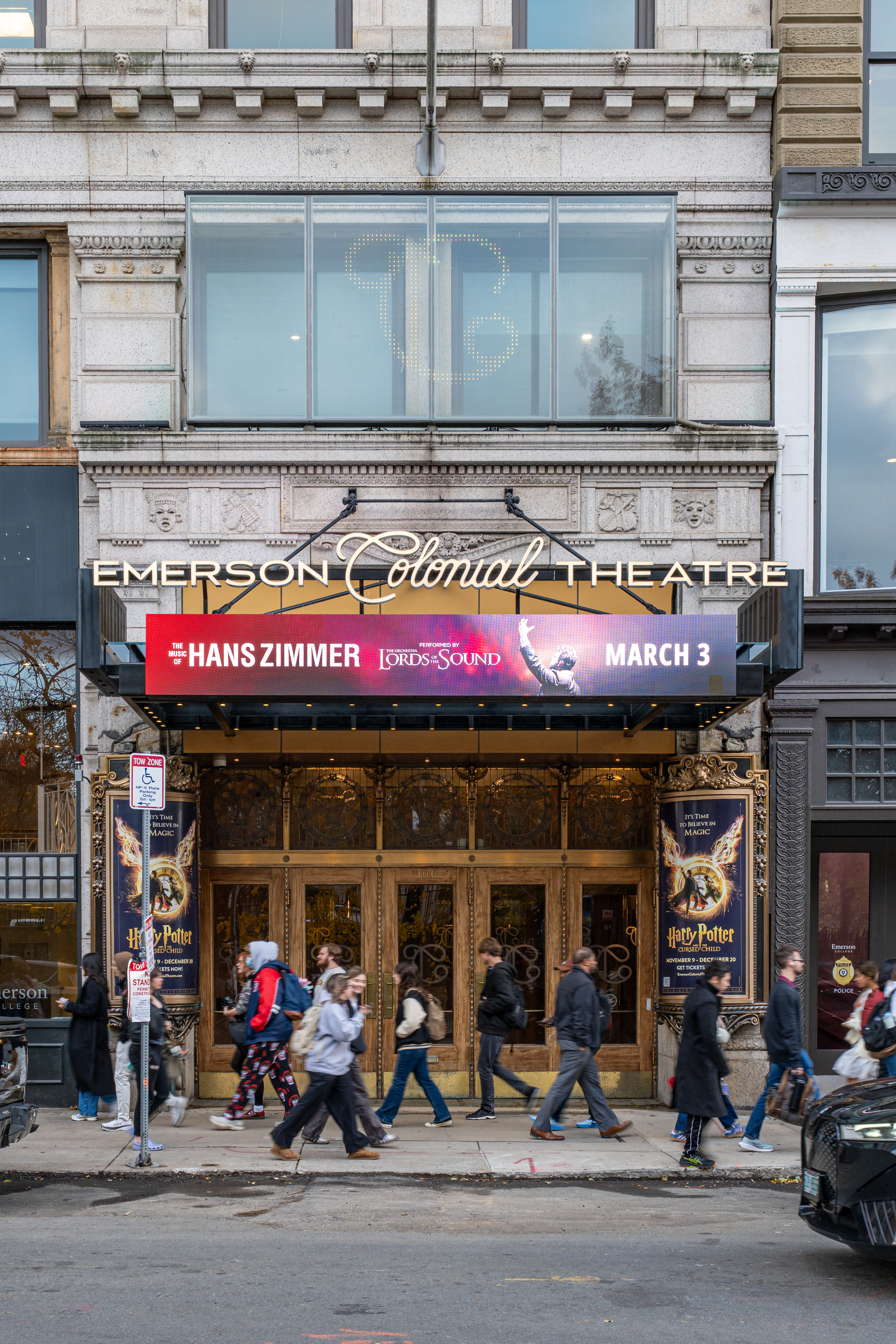
Exterior of the Theatre (2025)

=== Reopening ===
In January 2017, Emerson College announced a deal with the London-based Ambassador Theatre Group (now ATG Entertainment) to operate the Colonial Theatre under a 40-year lease. In a deal that was partly facilitated by the City of Boston, the college and ATG have both agreed to make substantial capital improvements to the venue which is now to be called the Emerson Colonial Theatre. It reopened in July 2018 featuring the premiere of a new musical, Moulin Rouge!, based on the film by Baz Luhrmann, prior to its Broadway run.

== Shows ==
The Colonial has long been a home to both touring productions of Broadway shows, and to previews of shows prior to their Broadway debuts. Notable shows which previewed at the Colonial before opening on Broadway include:

- Anything Goes
- Red, Hot and Blue
- Porgy and Bess
- Oklahoma! (called Away We Go! in Boston)
- The Merchant of Yonkers
- Born Yesterday
- Carousel
- Annie Get Your Gun
- The Odd Couple
- Promises, Promises
- La Cage aux Folles
- Grand Hotel
- Follies
- Beatlemania
- A Little Night Music
- The Diary of Anne Frank
- Seussical The Musical
- Tallulah
- High Fidelity
- Moulin Rouge!
- David Byrne's American Utopia
- Paranormal Activity
