= Instant Cash =

- Genre: Game show
- Created by: Cineflix
- Written by: Richard Mortimer; Marshall Jay Kaplan
- Directed by: Joey Case, Joel Goldberg
- Theme music composer: Craig McConnell
- Opening theme: "Instant Cash"
- Country of origin: Canada
- Original language: English
- No. of seasons: 3
- No. of episodes: 65

Production
- Executive producers: Simon Lloyd; Nick Cory-Wright
- Production locations: Toronto, Ontario, Canada
- Editor: Courtney Goldman
- Camera setup: Martin Wojtunik; Isaac Fisher
- Running time: 22 minutes
- Production company: Cineflix

Original release
- Network: TVtropolis
- Release: January 31, 2011 – present

Instant Cash is a Canadian game show which premiered January 31, 2011 and airs on TVtropolis on Mondays at 10pm ET/PT. It is produced and created by Cineflix. The show has a magic ATM, located in any mall in Toronto, Ontario, Canada. Instant Cash does not air in HD because the channel it airs on does not have an HD version. Colleen Rusholme provides the voice of the ATM, though for the first season the ATM was originally voiced by Ally Coyote. The series is directed by Joey Case and Joel Goldberg, and produced by Philip Whelan, Nicole Hamilton and Marshall Jay Kaplan.

== Gameplay ==
A bogus ATM is secretly set up at a grand court in a Canadian shopping centre; this is home base for most of the game. The contestant or contestants are asked a series of multiple choice questions, with four possible answers. Tier-1 questions have 10 seconds, 20 seconds for tier-2 questions, 30 seconds for tier-3 questions, and 1 minute for tier-4 questions. Every answer they correctly provide adds money to their winnings; just one incorrect answer forces them out of the game, but they keep their winnings up to that point.

At certain points during the game (when the player or players have accumulated $150, $800, $2,500, and $15,000), the ATM gives the contestant(s) a dare, which, if successfully completed, will double their money, but failure will result in their winnings being depleted and their elimination from the game. Examples of dares include being forced to wear ridiculous outfits, asking a stranger to propose to them, or finding a mall patron not in a store with a certain name. Contestants are also permitted to quit the game and cash out with their winnings at these particular milestones.

If any contestant makes it to the final question, the ATM will offer them one final Ultimate Dare, which is typically much more difficult than the three previous dares; examples include having a stranger allow them to throw a slush drink at his face or having a stranger permit them to shave his head. Any contestant who successfully completes this dare wins the top prize of $25,000. Failure, however, also results in winning nothing and elimination from the game.

There are also mini-games, where the ATM grabs the attention of a patron passing by. That contestant has the chance to win $20 if they can correctly answer one general knowledge question.

Money tree
$25,000
$15,000
$10,000
$5,000
$2,500
$2,000
$1,600
$800
$500
$300
$150
$50

== See also ==
- TVtropolis
- List of programs broadcast by TVtropolis
- Cineflix
