= Pantages Theatre (Minneapolis) =

Theater in Minneapolis, Minnesota

Coordinates: 44°58′41″N 93°16′32″W

- Mann Theater
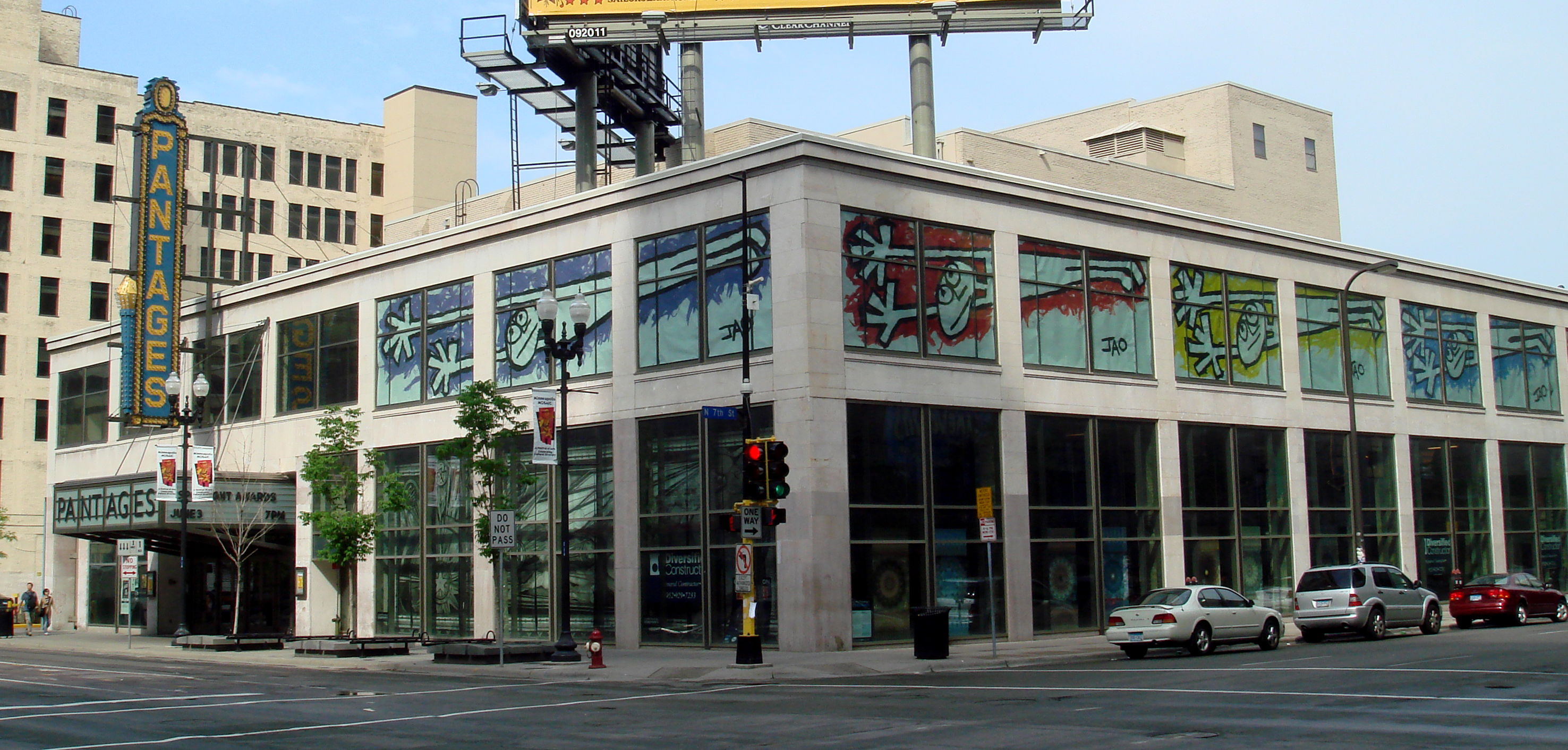
- Interactive map of Pantages Theatre
- Address: 710 Hennepin Avenue; Minneapolis, Minnesota; United States
- Owner: Hennepin Theatre Trust
- Operator: Historic Theatre Group
- Capacity: 1,014

Construction
- Opened: 1916
- Reopened: 2002

Website
- www.hennepintheatretrust.org

The Pantages Theatre is a historic theatre in Minneapolis, Minnesota. The original building was a Beaux-Arts style twelve-story complex on Hennepin Avenue, designed by Kees & Colburn and operated by Alexander Pantages, a Greek immigrant who opened 500 theatres.

The building was reduced significantly, to two stories, with an Art Moderne facade and a Beaux Arts interior. The Pantages Theatre innovated the mezzanine, and was also the first air conditioned theatre in Minnesota.

In 1945, the Pantages Theatre was renovated after being purchased by Edmond R. Ruben. It was then sold to Ted Mann in 1961; he owned many of the theatres in downtown Minneapolis. The Pantages Theatre closed in 1984, and was renovated and reopened by the City of Minneapolis in 2002. In 2005, the city transferred ownership of its theaters to the Hennepin Theatre Trust.

Since its reopening, the Pantages has been operated by the Historic Theatre Group.

Historic Theatre Group's original partner in booking the Pantages was Clear Channel Entertainment (now Live Nation). Live Nation sold most of its theatrical properties, including its Minneapolis operations, to Key Brand Entertainment in 2008.

== See also ==
- The Historic Orpheum Theatre
