= Broadway Across Canada =

- Type: Theatre company
- Legal status: Active
- Location: Ottawa, Ontario, Canada
- Official language: English
- Parent organization: John Gore Organization
- Website: broadwayacrosscanada.ca

Broadway Across Canada is an Ottawa, Ontario-based theatrical presenter which presents touring Broadway shows, family productions and other live theatrical events across Canada.

Broadway Across Canada was formed by the amalgamation of the historic touring Canada business headed by Ronald Andrew with Garth Drabinsky's Livent operations. Livent was acquired by SFX Entertainment in 1999. SFX was later sold to Clear Channel Communications which renamed the division Broadway Across Canada in 2005. Clear Channel subsequently spun off its live theater operations as Live Nation. The company, along with its parent Broadway Across America, was acquired from Live Nation in January 2008 by Key Brand Entertainment (now the John Gore Organization, owned by UK-based producer John Gore. In 2008, Broadway Across America and Broadway Across Canada sold over 6.4 million tickets throughout its 40 theatres in the United States and Canada.

== Venues ==
As of October 2016, Broadway Across Canada presents shows at the following venues:

- Calgary, Alberta: Southern Alberta Jubilee Auditorium
- Edmonton, Alberta: Northern Alberta Jubilee Auditorium
- Kitchener, Ontario: Centre In The Square
- Montreal, Quebec: Place des Arts and Théâtre Saint-Denis
- Ottawa, Ontario: National Arts Centre
- Quebec City, Quebec: Grand Théâtre de Québec
- Regina, Saskatchewan: Conexus Arts Centre
- Saskatoon, Saskatchewan: TCU Place
- Vancouver, British Columbia: Queen Elizabeth Theatre
- Winnipeg, Manitoba: Centennial Concert Hall

== Past Seasons ==
- 2026-2027 Season
  - & Juliet
  - Disney’s Beauty and the Beast
  - Mrs. Doubtfire
  - Hamilton
  - The Bodyguard
- 2025-2026 Season
  - MJ The Musical
  - Moulin Rouge! The Musical
  - Les Misérables
  - Mamma Mia!
  - Clue
- 2024-2025 Season
  - Beetlejuice
  - TINA – The Tina Turner Musical
  - SIX
  - Disney’s The Lion King
- 2023-2024 Season
  - Hadestown
  - Mean Girls
  - Hairspray
  - Disney’s Frozen
- 2022-2023 Season
  - Fiddler on the Roof
  - Pretty Woman: The Musical
  - Disney’s Aladdin
  - Ain’t Too Proud
- 2020-2021 Season
  - Chicago
  - Jesus Christ Superstar
  - Anastasia
  - Come From Away
  - Hamilton
- 2019-2020 Season
  - Dear Evan Hansen
  - Rent
  - Waitress
  - Finding Neverland
  - Wicked
- 2018-2019 Season
  - Beautiful: The Carole King Musical
  - The Illusionists
  - Come From Away
  - Les Misérables
  - The Book of Mormon
- 2017-2018 Season
  - The Phantom of the Opera
  - The Sound of Music
  - Jersey Boys
  - Motown The Musical
- 2016-2017 Season
  - Kinky Boots
  - Rodgers & Hammerstein’s Cinderella
  - Newsies
  - The Book of Mormon
- 2015-2016 Season
  - Disney’s The Lion King
  - Once
  - Dirty Dancing
  - Mamma Mia!
