= Totally Tracked Down =

- Created by: Marshall Jay Kaplan
- Developed by: Planetworks Inc.
- Written by: Carolyn Meland
- Directed by: Romano D'Andrea; Carolyn Meland
- Starring: Marshall Jay Kaplan
- Country of origin: Canada
- Original language: English
- No. of seasons: 1
- No. of episodes: 13

Production
- Executive producers: Planetworks Inc. Carolyn Meland; Romano D'Andrea; Jeff Preyra
- Cinematography: Gurjeet Mann
- Camera setup: Multi-camera
- Running time: 22 minutes

Original release
- Network: TVtropolis
- Release: September 2 – November 25, 2010

Totally Tracked Down is a television reality documentary show created by, produced by, and starring Marshall Jay Kaplan. The show centers around Kaplan's search for celebrities from past sitcoms and dramas, usually through a chain of connections from directors and producers, to co-stars, to family members, and eventually the celebrity. The show was broadcast on TVtropolis from September 2, 2010 to November 25, 2010, running for 13 episodes. It was also nominated for a Gemini Award in 2011 for Best General/Human Interest Series.

== Development ==
Kaplan based his idea for the show on his monthly column "Where Are They Now?", where he researches celebrities based on reader's questions. His column was published in "some 40 monthly newspapers." He pitched and sold the concept for Totally Tracked Down to TVTropolis, a Canadian specialty channel. Kaplan then partnered with Planetworks Inc., an award-winning production company.

Cara Stern of The Canadian Jewish News commented on Kaplan's searching process: "Kaplan tries to find out what various celebrities are really like through their connections, including people they know, places and things. Each connection introduces him to someone else, and the chain continues until he reaches the celebrity."

== Production ==
Totally Tracked Down is co-created and produced by Planetworks Inc., a Toronto-based boutique production company. Executive producers and partners Carolyn Meland, Romano D'Andrea and Jeff Preyra have created and produced several award-winning lifestyle reality series, including Style by Jury, Brides of Beverly Hills, and Chef Off!.

Filming took place from April to June 2010, lasting over 50 days for 13 episodes.

== Episode list ==
No.	Title	Celebrity	Original release date
1	"Master of Her Domain"	Estelle Harris	September 2, 2010
Kaplan searches for Seinfeld star Estelle Harris, who played George Costanza's mother. Along the way, he meets director Tom Cherones who directed an infamous episode involving Harris. He meets cartoon voice actor Charlie Adler, who gives him a lead for Harris appearing at an auction house. He goes, but Harris tells him off. He also an awkward meeting and interview with Larry David. After getting a lead from Harris's agent about where she walks her dogs, he meets Harris's son, Glen, and tracks down Harris the next day at the Los Angeles Zoo.
2	"The Incredible Lou Ferrigno"	Lou Ferrigno	September 9, 2010
Kaplan sets out to track down The Incredible Hulk star Lou Ferrigno. He meets Marvel Comics creator Stan Lee, 90+-year-old bodybuilding legend Joe Weider, and the man who played Jaws in the James Bond movies, Richard Kiel. He eventually finds Ferrigno at a gun show in Las Vegas.
3	"The Facts of Mindy"	Mindy Cohn	September 16, 2010
Kaplan seeks The Facts of Life star Mindy Cohn, who played Natalie Green. His first stop is with actress Charlotte Rae, who starred as Mrs. Garrett, and who also discovered Cohn. Rae is not pleased with him. Next, he tracks down Cloris Leachman, who played Beverly Ann. Leachman greets him, but she is wearing nothing but a towel. They then conduct the interview in her bed under the covers. He finally tracks Cohn at a dinner theater by sneaking backstage.
4	"Todd Bridges: He Knows What He's Talkin' 'Bout!"	Todd Bridges	September 23, 2010
Kaplan seeks Diff'rent Strokes star Todd Bridges, who played Willis Jackson. Within a week of his journey, Gary Coleman died; he remarks that with Coleman and Dana Plato gone, there are not many stars left. He tries many times to contact Conrad Bain, who played Bridges's dad, Mr. Drummond. Bain, who resides at a retirement home, is not interested in being interviewed or being in the limelight. He reaches Shavar Ross, who played Coleman's best friend on the show, as well as Bridges's mother, Betty Alice Pryor. Kaplan also discusses his LA Gang tour in South Central Los Angeles.
5	"Joan Van Ark: From Knots Landing to landing in her bed"	Joan Van Ark	September 30, 2010
While driving down a cul-de-sac, Kaplan gets inspired to track down Knots Landing star Joan Van Ark, who played Val Ewing. He meets creator David Jacobs, actress Michele Lee, and Van Ark's hairdresser and husband, John Marshall. It's a fast and furious chase that ends up in Joan;s bed.
6	"Christopher Knight: From His TV to His Real Family"	Christopher Knight	October 7, 2010
After his son breaks mom's favorite vase, Kaplan is inspired to track down The Brady Bunch star Christopher Knight, who played middle son Peter Brady. He meets up with creator Sherwood Schwartz. He later meets Barry Williams, who played Greg Brady, and meets Knight's wife, America's Next Top Model season 1 winner, Adrianne Curry.
7	"Mayim Bialik: A Career and Family That Blossomed"	Mayim Bialik	October 14, 2010
While attending a Bar Mitzvah, Kaplan notices how all the women are wearing big hats with flowers. This triggers him to think of the TV show Blossom and its star, Mayim Bialik, who played the title role. He interviews the creator and producer of Blossom, Don Reo, at the Paramount Studios lot. He learns that Bialik earned her Master's in Neuroscience, and that she also follows Judaism. He visits UCLA, speaks with Bialik's colleague, and later meets her rabbi. He also meets Bialik's parents. When he finally meets Bialik, they perform the opening dance from her old show.
8	"Charlene Tilton: From Hollywood to Dallas"	Charlene Tilton	October 21, 2010
Cleaning out all of his TV and movie memorabilia, Kaplan stumbles across a magazine cover of Dallas vixen Lucy Ewing, played by the petite blonde bombshell Charlene Tilton. Kaplan visits Dallas creator David Jacobs, and then he rides a horse to meet Steve Kanaly, who played Tilton's former on-screen love interest Ray Krebbs. He reaches Tilton's daughter, Cherish, who tells him that Tilton is at an Oscar event called the "Night of 100 Stars". At the red carpet event, he meets Larry Hagman, who played J.R. Ewing, and eventually has a lengthy meet with Tilton.
9	"Erin Moran: Many More Happy Days"	Erin Moran	October 28, 2010
Kaplan relives his crush of Joanie Cunningham of Happy Days by tracking down Erin Moran. He tries to contact Happy Days co-stars Ron Howard, Anson Williams, Donny Most and Scott Baio, but none of them get back to him. He manages to contact and meet Marion Ross who played the iconic TV mom, Mrs. Cunningham, on the show. Along with former child star Paul Petersen, Ross tells Kaplan about Moran's financial woes. Kaplan tracks down Moran, who is signing autographs at a car show. After hearing her sad story, he arranges a surprise reunion with Moran's mother, whom she has not seen in 20 years.
10	"David Faustino: Not Married with No Children"	David Faustino	November 4, 2010
Kaplan reunites with a friend from high school and thinks about pursuing David Faustino, who played younger brother Bud Bundy in the Married... with Children for eleven seasons. His trek involves visiting bars and hopping on and off tour buses. He meets director Gerry Cohen, then Faustino's brother Michael, and Faustino's writing partner, Sam Kass. After hearing that Faustino frequents "The Whiskey Bar", Kaplan visits the Sunset Marquis Hotel and then returns there two more times, before he finally spots him.
11	"Hello Squiggy!"	David Lander	November 11, 2010
Kaplan's visit to the movies and seeing an on-screen trivia question inspires him to seek David Lander, who played neighbor Squiggy on the sitcom Laverne & Shirley. He meets with Cindy Williams, who played Shirley, and also converses with Lander's daughter. He talks with actor Harry Shearer, who worked with Lander on the radio. He meets Lander, full-circle, at a movie theater.
12	"Saved by the Bell!"	Dustin Diamond	November 18, 2010
Kaplan searches for Dustin Diamond, who played Screech on the teen sitcom Saved by the Bell. His trek begins on the set of Extra with host Mario Lopez, who played Slater on the show. He also meets Dennis Haskins, who played Mr. Belding. He eventually meets Diamond.
13	"Holy Batman!"	Adam West	November 25, 2010
Kaplan searches for Adam West who played Bruce Wayne / Batman in the Batman TV series.

== Reception ==
On December 2, 2010, Kaplan posted on Facebook that TVTropolis had changed their mandate and the show was not renewed, but "was consoled when his show was posthumously nominated for a Gemini Award" in 2011 for Best General/Human Interest Series.
