= Broadway Across America =

Theatrical presenter, producer (founded 1982)

- Formation: 1982
- Founded at: Houston, Texas
- Type: Theatre company
- Legal status: Active
- Location: New York City, New York, United States
- Official language: English
- CEO: Richard Jaffe
- President: Susie Krajsa
- Parent organization: John Gore Organization
- Affiliations: Broadway.com The Broadway Channel BroadwayBox.com Group Sales Box Office
- Website: broadwayacrossamerica.com
- Formerly called: Pace Theatrical

Broadway Across America (BAA) is a presenter and producer of live theatrical events in the United States and Canada since 1982. It is currently owned by the John Gore Organization, which purchased it from Live Nation in 2008.

Through its network of presenting partners, BAA presents touring Broadway shows, family productions, and other live shows in over 40 North American venues. In 2008, Broadway Across America and its subsidiary Broadway Across Canada sold over 6.4 million tickets throughout its 40 theatres in the United States and Canada.

== History ==
Broadway Across America traces its history to the creation of Pace Theatrical in Houston, Texas in 1982. Pace Theatrical Group was created as a subsidiary of Pace Management Group, whose principals were Allen Becker and Sidney Shlenker, with Miles Wilkin installed as president of Pace Theatrical.

In the year of its formation, Pace Theatrical, together with Zev Buffman, purchased and fully restored the vintage 1927 3,000-seat Saenger Theatre in the French Quarter in New Orleans, which became a national landmark and New Orleans' new home for the performing arts. Pace also acquired the Chicago Theater in 1987 with Buffman and sold it a year later to Donjo Medlevine.

In 1988, Pace Theatrical acquired Buffman's theatrical interests in Florida for $1.6 million plus an additional $1.7 million if the business was profitable. The business comprised 6 theaters and 75,000 subscribers, which Buffman had built during the 1970s and early 1980s, creating a subscription model for touring theatrical productions. At that time, this increased the number of theaters that Pace used to 24.

In 1993, Pace took over direction and management of the Theatre League of Atlanta who presented a season of Broadway shows at the Fox Theatre in Atlanta, Georgia.

Pace was acquired by SFX Entertainment in 1997. In 1998, Pace acquired Boston based presenting and producing theatrical company, American Artists, for $25.7 million, including the Charles Playhouse in Boston and leases of two other Boston theaters: the Colonial Theatre and Wilbur Theatre. SFX also took over American Artists' "Broadway in Boston" subscription series.

SFX Entertainment were taken over by Clear Channel Communications and renamed Clear Channel Entertainment in 2000. Clear Channel made the touring shows operate nationwide and renamed the business Broadway Across America. In 2005, Clear Channel Entertainment was spun off into Live Nation. By 2005, the business operated or had interests in 13 performing centers and had the largest subscriber base in the United States for touring theatrical productions.

In January 2008, Live Nation sold its North American theatrical business (including the Broadway Across America business) to Key Brand Entertainment for $90.4 million. In 2016, Key Brand Entertainment was rebranded as the John Gore Organization.

== Acquisitions ==
- 1988: Zev Bufman Theater Partnership including Jackie Gleason Theater of the Performing Arts, Miami Beach; Parker Playhouse, Fort Lauderdale; Royal Poinciana Playhouse, Palm Beach; Bob Carr Performing Arts Center, Orlando; Tampa Bay Performing Arts Center, Tampa; Bayfront Center, St. Petersburg
- 1993: Theatre League of Atlanta — Atlanta
- 1998: Magicworks Entertainment — Salt Lake City
- 1998: American Artists — Boston
- 2000: Jujamcyn Productions — Minneapolis, Baltimore, Omaha, Portland, Milwaukee
- 2007: operations at Music Hall — Kansas City
- 2011: theatre at Peabody Opera House — St. Louis

== Venues ==
As of 2024, Broadway Across America presents shows at the following venues in the United States and Canada:

United States

- Albuquerque, New Mexico: Popejoy Hall
- Appleton, Wisconsin: Fox Cities
- Atlanta, Georgia: Fox Theatre
- Austin, Texas: Bass Concert Hall
- Baltimore, Maryland: Hippodrome Theatre
- Boise, Idaho: Velma V. Morrison Center for the Performing Arts
- Boston, Massachusetts: Boston Opera House, Emerson Colonial Theatre, and Charles Playhouse
- Cincinnati, Ohio: Aronoff Center
- Columbus, Ohio: Ohio Theatre and Palace Theatre
- Dallas, Texas: Music Hall at Fair Park and Winspear Opera House
- East Lansing, Michigan: Wharton Center for Performing Arts
- Fort Lauderdale, Florida: Broward Center
- Fresno, California: Saroyan Theatre
- Grand Rapids, Michigan: DeVos Performance Hall
- Houston, Texas: Hobby Center
- Indianapolis, Indiana: Clowes Memorial Hall, and Murat Theatre at Old National Centre
- Jacksonville, Florida: Times-Union Center
- Kansas City, Missouri: The Music Hall at Municipal Auditorium and Kauffman Center for the Performing Arts
- Louisville, Kentucky: The Kentucky Center
- Madison, Wisconsin: Overture Center
- Miami, Florida: Adrienne Arsht Center
- Milwaukee, Wisconsin: Uihlein Hall at Marcus Center
- Minneapolis, Minnesota: Orpheum Theatre, Pantages Theatre, and State Theatre
- Nashville, Tennessee: Tennessee Performing Arts Center,
- New Orleans, Louisiana: Mahalia Jackson Theater of the Performing Arts and Saenger Theatre
- Omaha, Nebraska: Orpheum Theatre
- Orange County, California: Segerstrom Center
- Orlando, Florida: Phillips Center
- Pittsburgh, Pennsylvania: Benedum Center
- Portland, Oregon: Keller Auditorium
- Salt Lake City, Utah: Eccles Theater,
- San Antonio, Texas: Majestic Theatre
- Seattle, Washington: Paramount Theatre
- Tempe, Arizona: ASU Gammage

Canada

- Calgary, Alberta: Southern Alberta Jubilee Auditorium
- Edmonton, Alberta: Northern Alberta Jubilee Auditorium
- Montreal, Quebec: Place des Arts
- Ottawa, Ontario: National Arts Centre
- Regina, Saskatchewan: Conexus Arts Centre
- Saskatoon, Saskatchewan: Sid Buckwold Theatre
- Vancouver, British Columbia: Queen Elizabeth Theatre
- Winnipeg, Manitoba: Centennial Concert Hall
