= Marshall Jay Kaplan =

Canadian caricaturist

- Born: July 24, 1965 (age 61); Toronto, Ontario, Canada
- Occupations: Television producer, television director, film producer
- Years active: 1982–present

Marshall Jay Kaplan (born July 24, 1965) is a Canadian caricaturist, award-winning director and multi-nominated TV and film producer. His notable projects include CNN's History of the Sitcom and the documentary film, Viewer Direction Advised (which played in New York, Los Angeles and Toronto film festivals). He was also the creator, executive producer and host of the celebrity-based show Totally Tracked Down.

== Career ==
=== Caricatures and Publications ===
Kaplan started drawing celebrity caricatures at the age of 7. These early caricatures included Charlie Chaplin, Groucho Marx, W.C. Fields and Laurel and Hardy. In 1980 at the age of 15, Kaplan's first celebrity caricature illustration was published in a local newspaper. In 1983, at the age of seventeen, Kaplan had his first gallery showing of his celebrity caricatures. The showing was focused on films of the day, including Dustin Hoffman as Tootsie. By the age of 21, Kaplan's caricatures were seen across Canada including The Toronto Star, The Toronto Sun, Southam Inc., and The Globe and Mail. By 1991, Kaplan was writing the entertainment column, 'Where Are They Now?', and supplying the accompanying celebrity caricature. At its peak, his 'Where Are They Now?' was syndicated in 65 newspapers across North America including the Miami Herald, the Las Vegas Review-Journal The Sacramento Bee and the Detroit Free Press. When Kaplan retired the column after its twentieth year in syndication, 'Where Are They Now?' had been published a total of 15,000 times across North America.

Kaplan's style of caricature is greatly influenced by Al Hirschfeld. Kaplan corresponded with Hirschfeld for a few years, becoming a protégé.

In 1987 on a flight from Toronto to Los Angeles, actress Bea Arthur happened to be on the same flight. Kaplan approached her and told her he had something in his portfolio to show her. After take off, Arthur invited Kaplan to sit with her. Kaplan opened up his portfolio to reveal his caricature of The Golden Girls cast that he had drawn. Arthur was so impressed with the drawing, she commissioned a second drawing from Kaplan to hang in the production offices of Witt/Thomas Productions. This was Kaplan's first commission of a celebrity caricature. Since then celebrities such as Quentin Tarantino, Julia Roberts, Jon Hamm, Nicolas Cage, George Michael and Bono, have caricatures of themselves drawn by Kaplan.

In 1991, Kaplan's work was exclusively used for the international board game, 'Who's Zat', manufactured and distributed by Irwin Toy. The game was manufactured and distributed in Canada, United States, Mexico and Finland.

In 1999, he was commissioned by Garth Drabinsky to illustrate the cover of The Phantom of the Opera Playbill, commemorating the closing night's performance of Colm Wilkinson that played at the Pantages Theatre (now Ed Mirvish Theatre). That night, Colm Wilkinson was present with both an original caricature from Marshall, as well as, an original caricature from Al Hirschfeld.

=== Television ===
Kaplan created and starred in a television series, Totally Tracked Down, which was based on newspaper column, 'Where Are They Now?'. The series ran for 13 episodes and earned Kaplan a Gemini Awards nomination for Best General/Human Interest Series as an Executive Producer.

Since them, Kaplan has produced and directed hundreds of episodes of television for major networks including CNN, Bravo, HGTV, TLC, ABC, CBS, A & E and The Food Network. Most notable series include, The History of the Sitcom, The Game Show Show, Lakefront Luxury and FBI True.

In 2018, Kaplan Executive Produced his first feature documentary, Viewer Direction Advised. Along with his son, Ben, who Directed, the film focused on how popular culture and television viewing has changed between generations. The film was distributed by Gravitas Ventures and featured legendary television producer, Norman Lear.

Marshall won Best Director, Documentary Series at the 2024 Canadian Screen Awards for the VICE series, The Dark Side of Comedy. Joan Rivers episode.
