= Gunnar Eide =

Norwegian actor and singer

Gunnar Eide (11 May 1920 – 2 July 2012) was a Norwegian actor, theatre director and impresario.

He was born in Stavanger. He was the theatre director of Stavanger Teater from 1945 to 1947, then an actor at Rogaland Teater from 1953 to 1955 and 1956 to 1960, only interrupted by a period at Edderkoppen Teater from 1955 to 1956. He was also a singer. He started an impresario business in 1963, attracting country musician Jim Reeves to Norway. His company Gunnar Eide Concerts, which was established in 1975, became a subsidiary of Live Nation and changed its name to Live Nation Norway. Eide was decorated with the King's Medal of Merit in gold in 2000. He died in July 2012 in Oslo.

== Extranl links ==
- Gunnar Eide at IMDb
