= Boston Opera House =

Venue in Boston, Massachusetts

Coordinates: 42.3542°N 71.0627°W

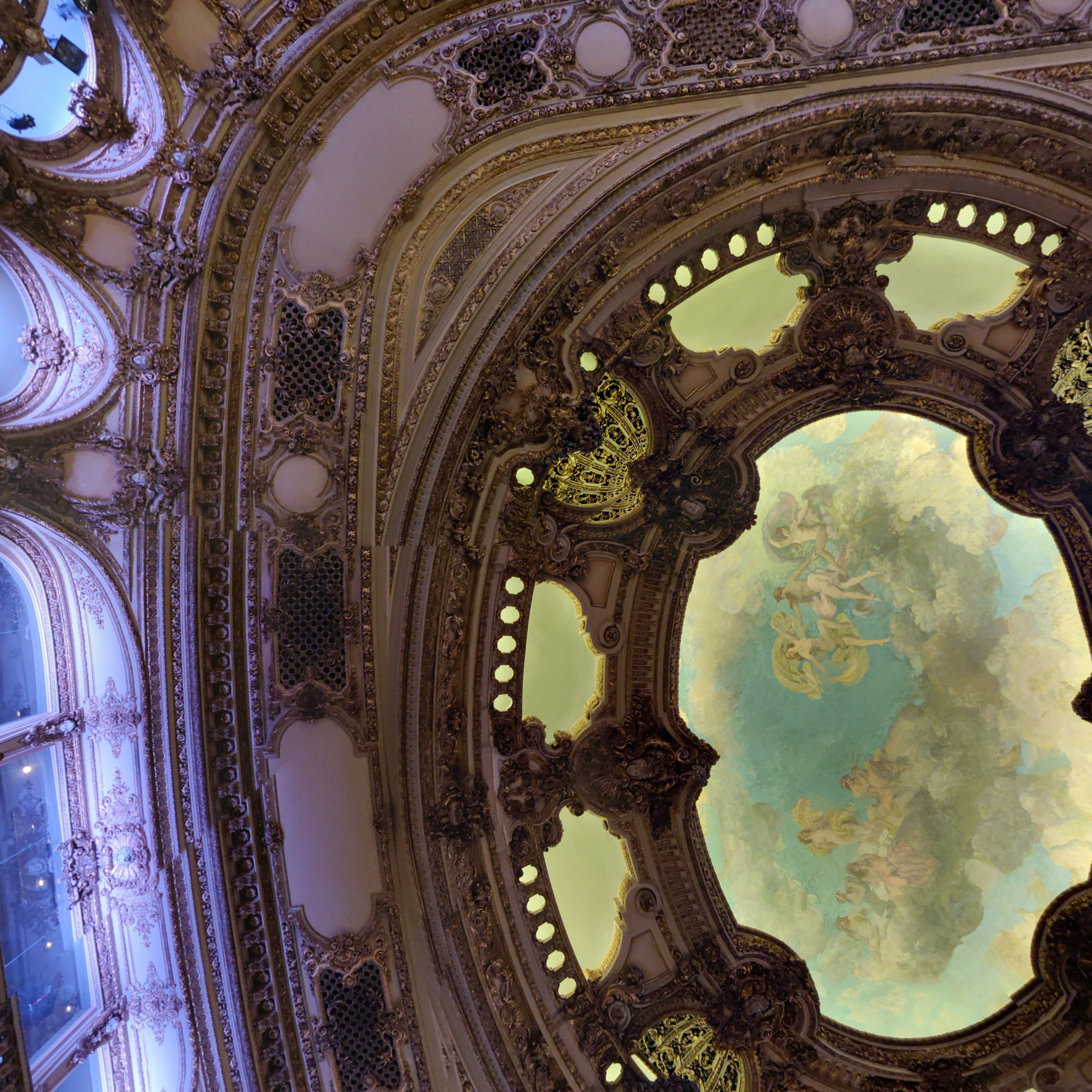
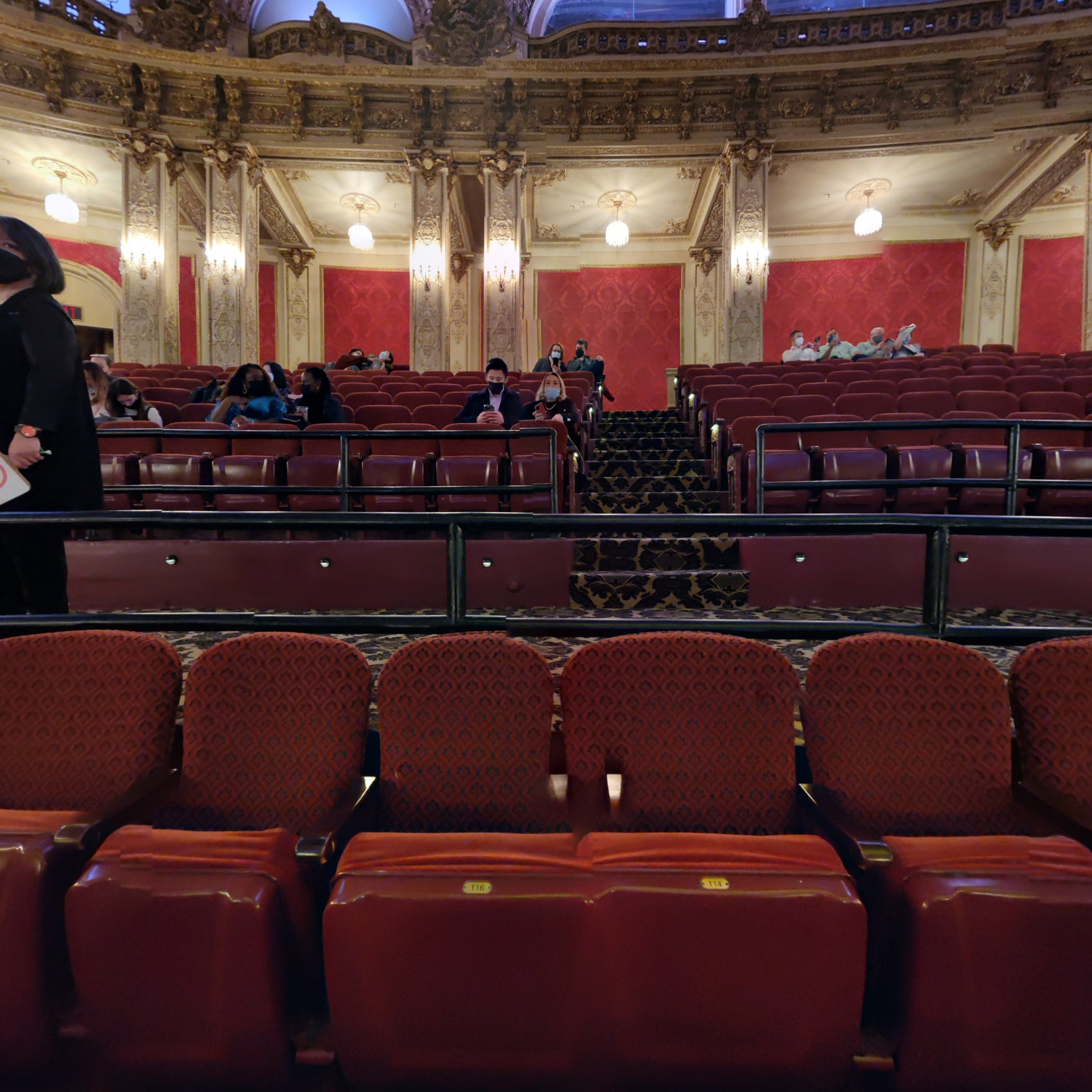
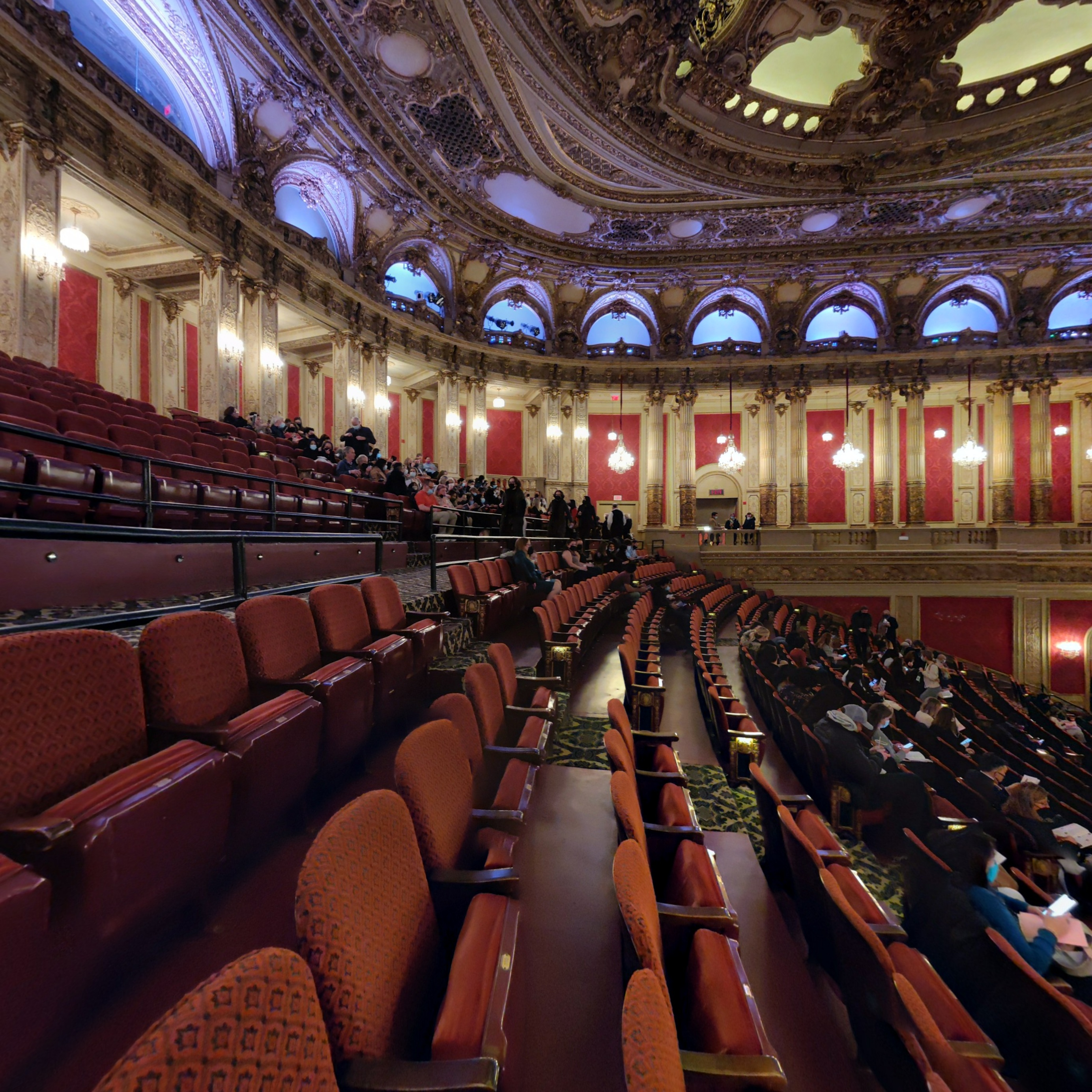
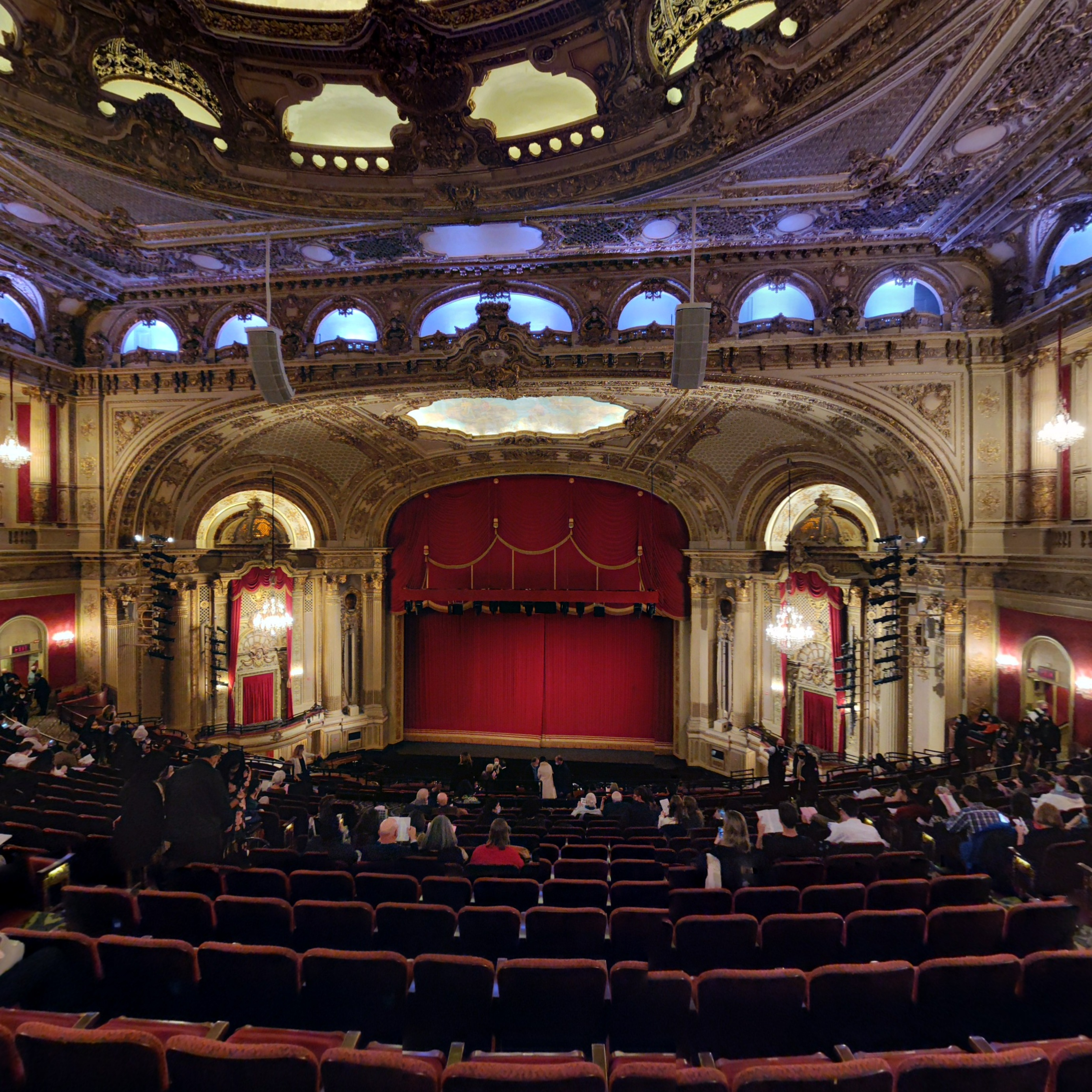
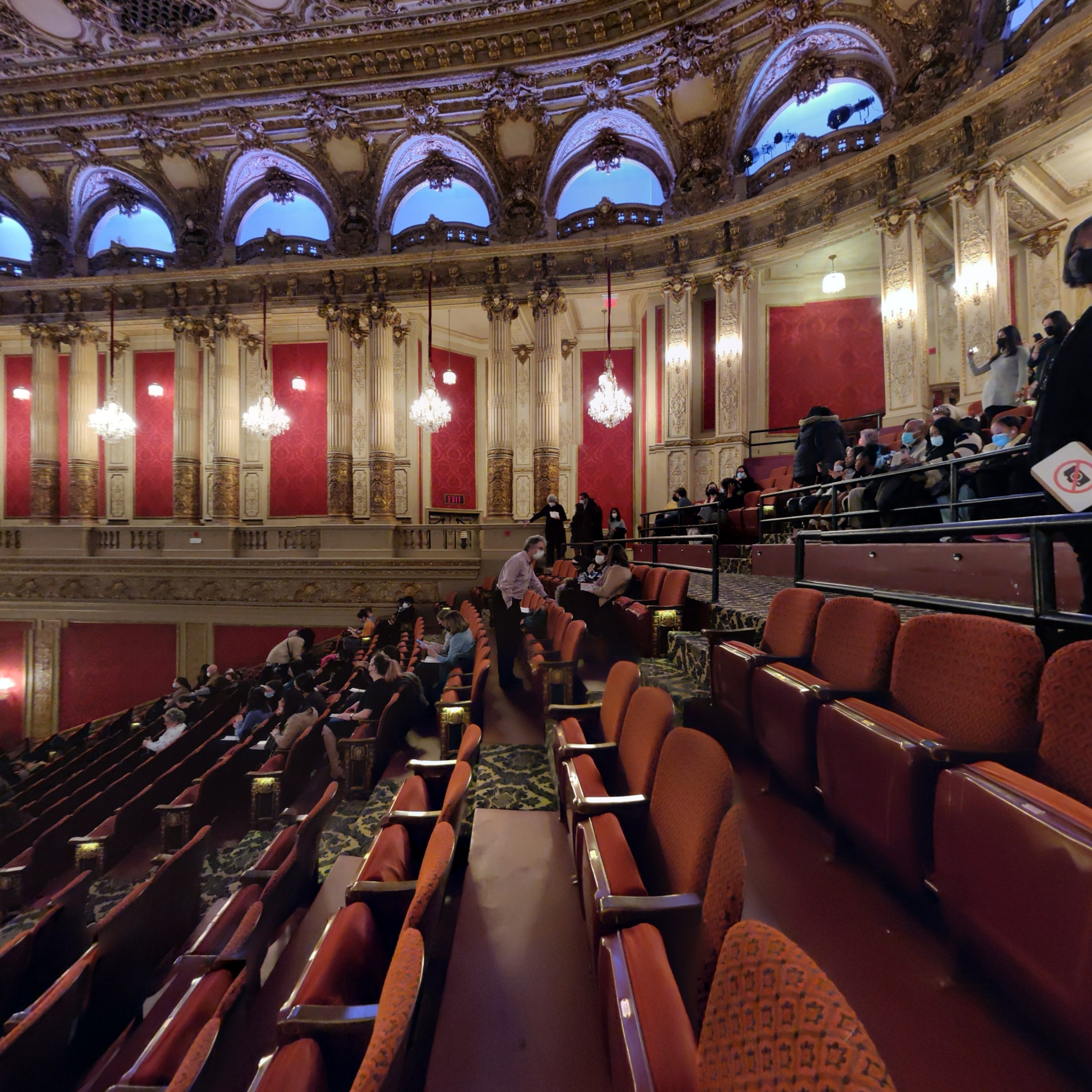
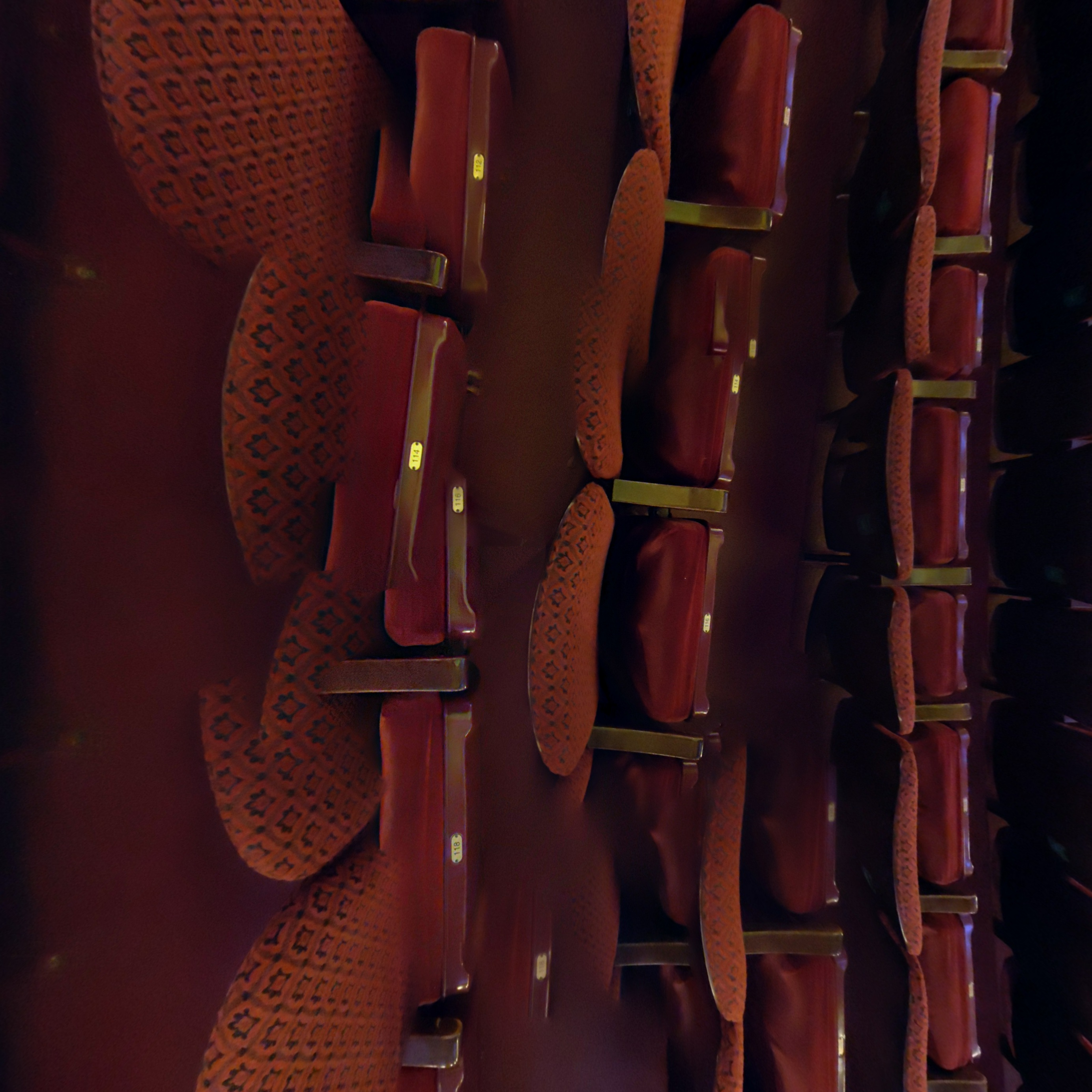
- Interior view of venue
- Interactive map of Boston Opera House
- Former names: B.F. Keith Memorial Theatre (1928–29); RKO Keith's Memorial Theatre (1929–65); Savoy Theatre (1965–80)
- Address: 539 Washington St; Boston, MA 02111-1718
- Owner: Boston Opera House Ventures, LLC
- Operator: Broadway Across America (theater productions)
- Capacity: 2,600

Construction
- Opened: October 29, 1928
- Closed: 1990–2004
- Reopened: July 16, 2004
- Architect: Thomas W. Lamb

Tenants
- Boston Ballet; Broadway Across America in Boston

Website
- Venue Website

The Boston Opera House, also known as the Citizens Bank Opera House, is a performing arts and esports venue located at 539 Washington St. in Boston, Massachusetts. It was originally built as the B.F. Keith Memorial Theatre, a movie palace in the Keith-Albee chain. The chain became part of RKO when it was established just before the theater opened on October 29, 1928, and it was also known as the RKO Keith's Theater. After operating for more than 50 years as a movie theater, it was rededicated in 1980 as a home for the Opera Company of Boston, which performed there until the opera company closed down in 1990 due to financial problems. The theater was reopened in 2004 after a major restoration, and it currently serves as the home of the Boston Ballet and also hosts touring Broadway shows.

== History ==
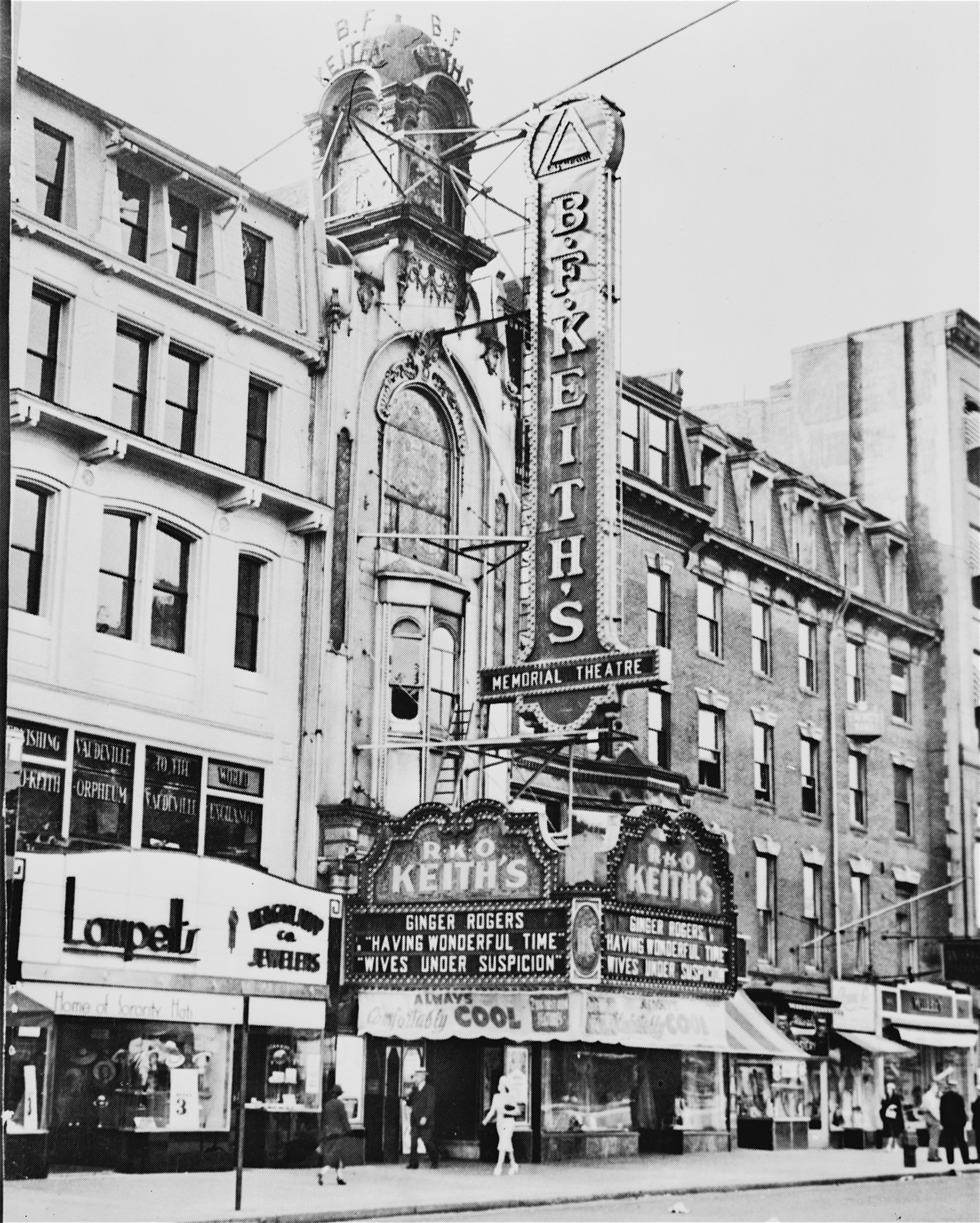
Tremont Street entrance of RKO Keith's Memorial Theatre (1938)

The Boston Opera House was originally designed as the B.F. Keith Memorial Theatre, a lavish movie theater in the Keith-Albee chain. The Keith's Memorial was one of his most elaborate designs of the prominent theater architect Thomas W. Lamb. It was dedicated to the vaudeville pioneer B.F. Keith. On October 23, 1928, just before the theater opened, the Radio-Keith-Orpheum (RKO) company was formed and became the owner of the theater. The theater opened on October 29, 1928, presenting first-run films along with live vaudeville. By 1929, the theater had converted to showing only films and remained a leading Boston movie showcase through the 1950s. It became known as RKO Keith's, and bore signage that said both "B.F. Keith's" and "RKO Keith's" (see the 1938 photo shown at right).

In 1965 the Sack Theaters company acquired the theater and renamed it the Savoy Theater. Sack later added a second smaller cinema in the theater's stage space, separated from the original auditorium by a masonry wall built across the proscenium.

In 1980, after closing as a movie house, the theater became the home of opera director Sarah Caldwell's Opera Company of Boston and was renamed the Boston Opera House. The theater was acquired and renovated by the opera company with the help of Boston arts patron Susan Timken. After a decade of opera productions at the house, Caldwell's company collapsed due to financial troubles in 1991. Having previously produced opera since 1958 in rented theaters, the company was not financially prepared to cope with the substantial costs of upkeep for the large theater which had previously been poorly maintained for decades. The company's failure left the theater dark and without funds to maintain it.

Unheated, the building fell prey to extensive water damage, severely damaging the electrical system and the decorative plaster interior of the auditorium. The company's costumes, collected for decades and stored under the damaged roof, were lost. In 1996, the former opera company relinquished ownership of the building.

Mayor Thomas Menino, with the aid of Senator Edward Kennedy (whose father, Joseph, was RKO's founder and original financier), helped to get the theater landmark status in 1999 through the Boston Landmarks Commission. After a series of failed or delayed development proposals, Clear Channel's live/concert division, today's Live Nation, agreed to renovate the theater. The need to enlarge the trapezoidal stage house into the street between buildings provoked a multi-year court fight with the neighboring Tremont on the Commons condominium building, whose concerns with fire safety were eventually overcome with the persuasion of Mayor Menino.

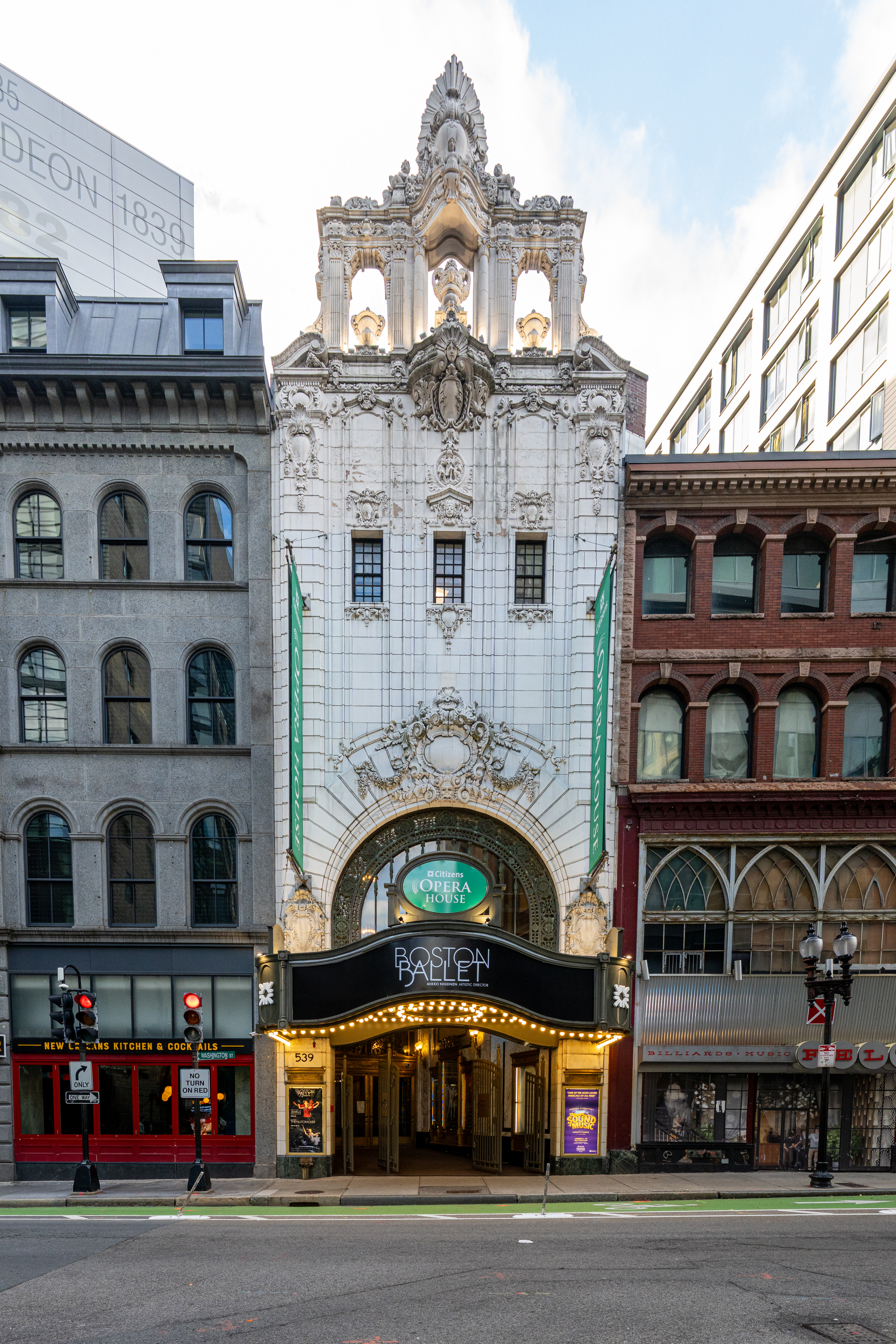
(2025)

The Boston opera community welcomed the efforts of Mayor Menino and Clear Channel to refurbish the Opera House and the damaged interior was restored in a $38 million renovation. It reopened on July 16, 2004, with the Broadway production of The Lion King. Live Nation has kept the historic theater busy and active with long runs of touring Broadway musicals and pop concerts. Though the theater was re-designed with opera in mind and Live Nation's development agreement includes a clause requiring the production of opera for fourteen days per year, the Opera House is a current-day misnomer, as opera has yet to take place in the renovated venue.

The current owner of the theater is Boston Opera House Ventures, LLC, a partnership of local Boston businessmen Don Law and David Mugar. Its primary tenants are Broadway Across America, Boston Uprising and the Boston Ballet. Home to Boston Ballet's annual production of The Nutcracker since 2005, the theater became the company's permanent home in 2009.

== See also ==
- Boston Opera House (1909)
- Benjamin Franklin Keith (1846–1914), namesake of B.F. Keith Memorial Theatre
- RKO Boston Theatre
