= List of programs broadcast by DTour =

This is a list of television programs currently and formerly broadcast by the Canadian television channel DTour and its former incarnations as Prime and TVtropolis.

== Current programming ==
This is a list of programs currently being broadcast.

=== A–E ===
- Border Security: America's Front Line
- Border Security
- Chuck (TV Series)

=== F–J ===
- George Lopez
- Haven

=== K–O ===
- The Middle
- Mr. D

=== P–T ===
- Paranormal Lockdown
- Two and a Half Men
- Rizzoli & Isles

=== U–Z ===
- The West Wing

== Past ==
=== A–E ===
- 3rd Rock from the Sun
- A Man Called Shenandoah
- The A-Team
- Ad Persuasion
- Adam-12
- Adventures of Superman
- Airport 24/7: Miami
- The Alaska Triangle
- Alias Smith and Jones
- All in the Family
- America Declassified
- America's Funniest Home Videos
- The Andy Griffith Show
- Automan
- Baggage Battles
- Batman
- Battlestar Galactica
- Baywatch
- Best Daym Takeout
- The Beverly Hillbillies
- Beverly Hills, 90210
- Bewitched
- Beyond the Unknown
- The Big Valley
- The Bionic Woman
- Bizarre Foods America
- Blossom
- The Bob Newhart Show
- Bonanza
- Bosom Buddies
- Boy Meets World
- Branded
- The Brady Bunch
- Brew Dogs
- Bronco
- Burger Land
- Buried Worlds with Don Wildman
- Cagney and Lacey
- Canadian Pickers
- Cannon
- Car 54, Where Are You?
- Charles in Charge
- Cheers
- Cheyenne
- Coach
- Columbo
- The Cosby Show
- The Cowboys
- Crazy Like a Fox
- Custer
- The Dakotas
- Dallas
- Dark Shadows
- Dawson's Creek
- Deal or No Deal
- Dennis the Menace
- Desperate Housewives
- Destination Fear
- Diagnosis: Murder
- The Dick Van Dyke Show
- Diff'rent Strokes
- Disaster DIY
- The Donna Reed Show
- Doogie Howser, M.D.
- The Doris Day Show
- Dragnet
- The Drew Carey Show
- The Dukes of Hazzard
- Eat St.
- Ellen
- Evening Shade
- Everybody Loves Raymond
- Extreme
- Extreme RVs
- Extreme Specials

=== F–J ===
- F-Troop
- The Facts of Life
- Falcon Crest
- The Fame
- Family Affair
- Family Guy
- Family Ties
- Fantasy Island
- Father Knows Best
- Feed the Beast
- Fish TV
- Food Wars
- Frasier
- The Fresh Prince of Bel-Air
- Friday the 13th: The Series
- Friends
- The Fugitive
- Full House
- George Lopez
- Get Smart
- Gilligan's Island
- Gilmore Girls
- Gimme a Break!
- Good Times
- Going Places
- The Golden Girls
- Gomer Pyle, U.S.M.C.
- The Greatest American Hero
- Great Taste, No Money
- The Green Hornet
- Growing Pains
- The Guns of Will Sonnett
- Gunsmoke
- Happy Days
- Hardcastle and McCormick
- Have Gun, Will Travel
- Hawaii Five-O
- Hazel
- Head of the Class
- Hercules: The Legendary Journeys
- Highlander
- Highway to Heaven
- Hill Street Blues
- Hogan's Heroes
- The Honeymooners
- Hotel Impossible
- Hunter
- I Dream of Jeannie
- I Love Lucy
- Ice Road Truckers
- The Incredible Hulk
- The Invisible Man
- Joanie Loves Chachi

=== K–O ===
- Kate and Allie
- The King of Queens
- Kitchen Confidential
- Knight Rider
- Kodiak
- Kolchak: The Night Stalker
- Kung Fu
- Land of the Giants
- Laredo
- Laverne & Shirley
- Leave It to Beaver
- The Legend of Jesse James
- Lois & Clark: The New Adventures of Superman
- The Lone Ranger
- The Loretta Young Show
- Lost and Sold
- Lost in Space
- The Love Boat
- Lost Secrets
- The Lucy Show
- MacGyver
- Mad About You
- Magnum, P.I.
- The Man from U.N.C.L.E.
- Mannix
- The Many Loves of Dobie Gillis
- Marblehead Manor
- Married... with Children
- Martin
- The Mary Tyler Moore Show
- Massive Moves
- Maverick
- Max Headroom
- M*A*S*H
- McHale's Navy
- Melrose Place
- Miami Vice
- Mission: Impossible
- The Mod Squad
- Moesha
- Money Moron
- Moonlighting
- The Monroes
- Mork & Mindy
- Monumental Mysteries
- Mr. Lucky
- The Munsters
- Murder, She Wrote
- Murder In Paradise
- Murphy Brown
- My Three Sons
- Mysteries at the Museum Specials
- The Nanny
- Newhart
- Night Court
- NYPD Blue
- On Our Own
- One Day at a Time
- The Outcasts
- The Outer Limits

=== P–T ===
- Paper Moon
- The Partridge Family
- The Patty Duke Show
- Pacific Palisades
- Perfect Strangers
- Perry Mason
- Peter Gunn
- Petrocelli
- Petticoat Junction
- The Phil Silvers Show
- The Phoenix
- The Price Is Right
- Punky Brewster
- Quincy, M.E.
- The Rat Patrol
- Rawhide
- The Real McCoys
- The Rebel
- Remington Steele
- Renegade
- Rhoda
- Rick and Steve
- The Rifleman
- Ripley's Believe It or Not
- Riptide
- The Rockford Files
- Room to Grow
- Roseanne
- Rust Valley Restorers
- St. Elsewhere
- Sand Masters
- Sanford and Son
- Saturday Night Live
- Savannah
- Saved by the Bell
- Seinfeld
- 7th Heaven
- 77 Sunset Strip
- Silver Spoons
- The Six Million Dollar Man
- Sledge Hammer
- Spenser: For Hire
- Spin City
- Stargate SG-1
- Starsky and Hutch
- Star Trek: The Original Series
- Star Trek: The Next Generation
- Stingray
- Sturgis Raw
- T.J. Hooker
- Tales of the Gold Monkey
- Tales of Tomorrow
- Taxi
- The Streets of San Francisco
- That '70s Show
- These Woods Are Haunted
- Three's Company
- Time Trax
- Too Close for Comfort
- Touched by an Angel
- Trackdown
- Twelve O'Clock High
- Two and a Half Men
- The Twilight Zone
- 21 Jump Street

=== U–Z ===
- Ultimate Travel: Killer Beach Houses
- The Untouchables
- V: The Series
- Voyage to the Bottom of the Sea
- Wagon Train
- Walker, Texas Ranger
- Wanted: Dead or Alive
- Webster
- Welcome Back Kotter
- Werewolf
- White Collar
- Whiz Kids
- Who's the Boss?
- Wings
- Wipeout
- Wiseguy
- WKRP in Cincinnati
- Wonder Woman
- The Wonder Years
- World's Weirdest Restaurants
- The X-Files
- Xena: Warrior Princess
- Xtreme Waterparks
- The Young Lawyers
- Zorro
