= Southern Alberta Jubilee Auditorium =

Performing arts venue in Calgary, Canada

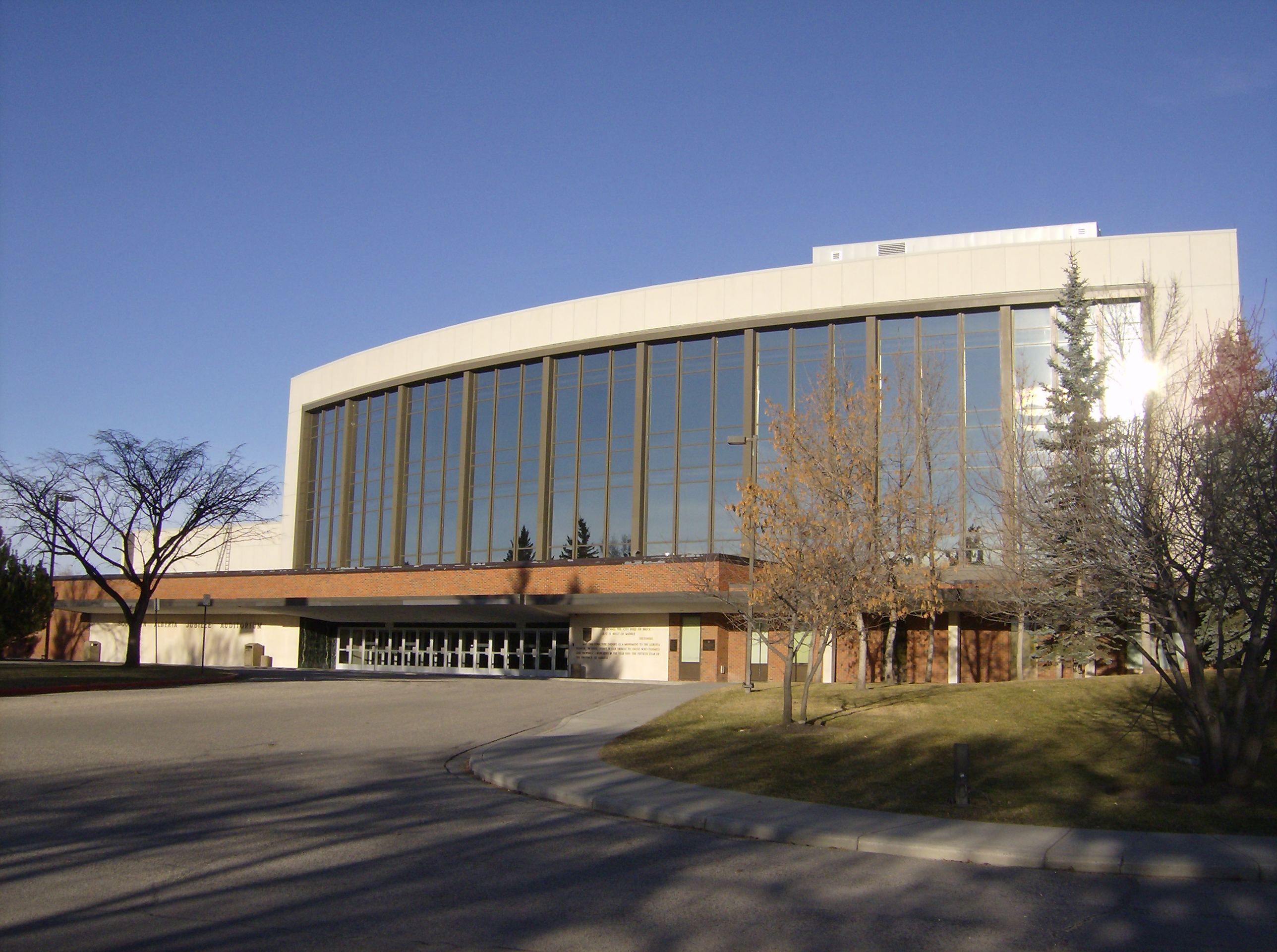
- Southern Alberta Jubilee Auditorium
- Interactive map of Southern Alberta Jubilee Auditorium
- Address: 1415 14 Ave NW; Calgary, Alberta; T2N 1M4
- Coordinates: 51.0625°N 114.0925°W
- Owner: Government of Alberta
- Capacity: 2,523
- Type: Performing arts centre
- Public transit: Jubilee station

Construction
- Opened: 1955

Tenants
- Calgary Opera, Alberta Ballet Company

Website
- www.jubileeauditorium.com/calgary

The Southern Alberta Jubilee Auditorium is a performing arts, culture and community facility located in Calgary, Alberta, Canada.

The auditorium was built in 1955 to celebrate the 50th anniversary of Alberta. It is owned and operated by the Government of Alberta.

The Jubilee is home to Calgary Opera, Alberta Ballet, and the annual Royal Canadian Legion Royal Canadian Legion Remembrance Day Ceremonies. For many years it has hosted touring Broadway shows, stand-up comedians, theatre productions, bands, orchestras, dance festivals and awards ceremonies. Other tenants include Broadway Across Canada.

In 2005 as part of the celebrations for the Alberta Centennial, the auditorium underwent extensive renovations totalling $91 million.

The main theatre capacity to up 2,523 people on three levels. Renovations beginning in 2004 focused on extensive improvements including: acoustics, seating, climate controls, and a revitalized new look.

== See also ==
- Northern Alberta Jubilee Auditorium
