= John Gore (theatre producer) =

British entertainment producer (born 1962)

- Born: John Ellis Gore; 1961 (age 64–65)
- Education: Harrow School; London University
- Occupation: Producer
- Writing career
- Genre: Theatre
- Notable awards: Tony Award; Drama Desk Award; Emmy Award; Olivier Award
- Website: www.johngore.com

John Ellis Gore (born 1961) is a British entertainment producer, known for his live theatre company the John Gore Organization, based in North America.

== Early life and education ==
Gore was educated at Harrow School, and graduated in film and theatre from the University of London in 1987. His student production of Joe Orton's What The Butler Saw enjoyed a successful professional run at the Bloomsbury Theatre. Gore's producing and/or directing credits on the West End include: Thunderbirds F.A.B. (produced first in 1989 is currently the most revived show in the history of the West End, returning for a sixth time in 2002); Star Trek – the Lost Voyage of the Enterprise; and Wallace & Gromit.

== Career ==
Gore founded Key Brand Entertainment (KBE) in 2004 to develop theatrical properties in the United States. Broadway Across America (BAA) was acquired in January 2008, from the music company Live Nation, while the e-commerce theatre website Broadway.com was acquired in December 2010, from Hollywood Media Corp. In 2016, KBE was rebranded as the John Gore Organization.

Gore has received 25 Tony Awards, an Olivier Award and 2 NY Emmy Award. Gore has been a member of the board of governors of The Broadway League since 2008.

In 2010 Gore was nominated for a Prime Time Emmy Award for Outstanding Non-Fiction Special for Believe: The Eddie Izzard Story. In 2018 Gore won a NY Emmy Award for At The Tonys with Imogen Lloyd Webber for WCBS-TV.

Gore also has extensive property interests in County Donegal, Ireland.

Gore has been named as one of Variety’s 500 Most Influential Business Leaders in the global media industry.

== John Gore Organization ==
The John Gore Organization (JGO), formerly known as Key Brand Entertainment (KBE), is a producer and distributor of live theater in North America, as well as an e-commerce company, focused on theater. KBE was founded in the UK in 2004 by Gore, who is the company's chairman, CEO and owner.

The company's assets include:

- Broadway Across America (BAA) a major theater touring organization in North America acquired in 2008. With over 400,000 season subscribers, BAA has earned 215 Tony Awards in over 30 years of producing and investing in Broadway shows. BAA owns and/or operates five theaters in Boston, Baltimore, and Minneapolis.
- Broadway.com, the e-commerce site, with the 2010 acquisition of Theatre Direct NY. Broadway.com has been cited as the number one source of information on Broadway based on the Broadway League Audience Demographic Survey In 2018, Broadway.com won a NY Emmy for its production of At The Tonys with Imogen Lloyd Webber for WCBS-TV.
- Group Sales Box Office, merged with Broadway.com/Groups in 2012.
- BroadwayBox.com, the top source for Broadway discounts was acquired in 2013.
- The Broadway Channel, the video content brand acquired in 2015.
- In August 2023, it was announced JGO had acquired Hammer Films and Studios.

=== Broadway Brands acquisition ===
In December 2021, the John Gore Organization bought Broadway Brands, the publisher of Broadway Briefing and Broadway News.

== Hammer Films acquisition and John Gore Studios ==
In 2023, John Gore acquired Hammer Films. Under his ownership, Hammer has announced an ongoing 4K restoration program to restore its film library, including gothic classics such as The Curse of Frankenstein and Dracula. The company has also announced the release of a new title under the Hammer banner, Ithaqua, a horror feature introducing the first new Hammer monster in sixty years.

In 2025, Gore established John Gore Studios, a global film and television studio headquartered in London and New York. The fully integrated studio brings together specialist labels spanning development, production, restoration and distribution. The studio oversees Hammer’s revival and develops original projects in collaboration with industry partners.

== Awards ==
Theatre
As the John Gore Organization

- Sunset Boulevard - 2025 Best Revival of a Musical
- Purpose - 2025 Best Play
- Maybe Happy Ending - 2025 Best Musical
- Stereophonic - 2024 Best Play
- The Outsiders - 2024 Best Musical
- Kimberly Akimbo - 2023 Best Musical
- Revival Parade - 2023 Best Revival Of A Musical
- A Strange Loop - 2022 Tony Award for Best Musical
- The Lehman Trilogy - 2022 Tony Award for Best Play
- Company - 2022 Tony Award for Best Revival Of A Musical; Drama Desk Award
- Moulin Rouge! The Musical – 2020 Tony Award for Best Musical
- Oklahoma! - 2019 Tony Award for Best Revival Of A Musical
- The Prom - 2019 Drama Desk Award for Outstanding Musical
- The Waverly Gallery - 2019 Drama Desk Award
- The Band's Visit - 2018 Tony Award for Best Musical
- Angels in America - 2018 Tony Award for Best Revival of a Play; Drama Desk Award
- Dear Evan Hansen - 2017 Tony Award for Best Musical
- Hello, Dolly! - 2017 Tony Award for Best Revival of a Musical; Drama Desk Award
- A View From The Bridge - 2016 Tony Award for Best Revival of a Play; Drama Desk Award

As Broadway Across America

- The Humans - 2016 Tony Award for Best Play; Drama Desk Award
- Pippin - 2013 Tony Award for Best Revival of a Musical; Drama Desk Award
- The Gershwins' Porgy and Bess - 2012 Tony Award for Best Revival of a Musical
- War Horse - 2011 Tony Award for Best Play; Drama Desk Award
- Memphis — 2010 Tony Award for Best New Musical; Drama Desk Award
- La Cage Aux Folles — 2010 Tony Award for Best Revival of a Musical; Drama Desk Award
- Hair — 2009 Tony Award for Best Revival of a Musical; Drama Desk Award
- Spring Awakening — 2009 Olivier Award for Best New Musical in London
- Passing Strange — 2009 Drama Desk Award for Best New Play
- Boeing-Boeing — 2008 Tony Award for Best Revival of a Play; Drama Desk Award

Television
As Broadway.com

- Broadway Profiles with Tamsen Fadal - 2021 NY Emmy Award for Best Magazine Series.
- At The Tonys with Imogen Lloyd Webber - 2018 NY Emmy Award for Special Event Coverage (Other than News and Sports)

As John Gore (Theater Producer)

- 2024 Variety's 500 Most Influential Business Leaders in Media and Entertainment
- 2023 Variety's 500 Most Influential Business Leaders in Media and Entertainment
- 2022 Variety's 500 Most Influential Business Leaders in Media and Entertainment.
- 2021 Variety's 500 Most Influential Business Leaders in Media and Entertainment.
- 2020 Variety's 500 Most Influential Business Leaders in Media and Entertainment.
- 2019 Variety's 500 Most Influential Business Leaders in Media and Entertainment.

== Philanthropy ==
Philanthropically, Gore has supported The Arthur Miller Foundation with a grant to provide theater educators in NYC Public Schools. In 2017, Gore raised $500,000 for Hurricane Maria relief in Puerto Rico by producing a benefit performance of Thornton Wilder's Our Town starring Scarlett Johansson, Robert Downey Jr. and Chris Evans. It was announced in September 2018 that JGO pledged $100,000 to the T. Fellowship at Columbia University, a program that fosters new creative producers.

In 2019, the John Gore Organization donated a $1 million gift to The Princess Grace Foundation-USA toward a new award with the goal to identify and support extraordinary young stage talent annually.

In 2021, Gore launched the Broadway Across America/BTC Apprenticeship program to help increase representation of black identifying professionals within the Broadway industry and was a founding funder for The Theater Leadership Project, providing additional fellowships throughout the Broadway industry. In March 2020, after theaters shut down due to the Coronavirus pandemic, Broadway Across America gave purchasers the option to donate the value of their unused tickets to Broadway Cares/Equity Fights AIDS, resulting in a $1 million donation towards the cause.

In August 2023, Gore made a substantial contribution to name the Entertainment Community Fund building in honor of EGOT recipient Rita Moreno. This cultural center is part of a larger $135 million development project, which also includes provisions for affordable housing for artists and support for young filmmakers.

In 2024, John Gore and The Juilliard School partnered to make the Master of Fine Arts in Acting program tuition-free beginning in the Fall 2024 semester. The initiative provides full tuition coverage for all current and future MFA Acting students.
