= Live Nation (events promoter) =

American events promoter

- Formerly: SFX Entertainment (1996–2000); Clear Channel Entertainment (2000–2005)
- Type: Subsidiary
- Industry: Event promotion
- Founded: 1996; 30 years ago
- Founder: Robert F. X. Sillerman
- Headquarters: Beverly Hills, California, US
- Revenue: ▲US$ 10.34 billion (2017)
- Operating income: ▲US$ 91.4 million (2017)
- Net income: ▼US$ -6 million (2017)
- Total assets: ▲US$ 7.504 billion (2017)
- Total equity: ▲US$ 1.418 million (2017)
- Number of employees: Full-time: 8,800; Part-time: 28,000
- Parent: SFX Broadcasting (1996–2000); Clear Channel Communications (2000–2005); Live Nation Entertainment (2010–present)
- Website: LiveNation.com

Live Nation is an American events promoter and venue operator based in Beverly Hills, California. Founded in 1996 by Robert F. X. Sillerman as SFX Entertainment, the company's business was built around consolidating concert promoters into a national entity to counter the oversized influence of ticket behemoth Ticketmaster. In 2000, the company was sold to Clear Channel Communications for US$4.4 billion and operated as Clear Channel Entertainment until 2005, when it was spun off as Live Nation. In 2010, Live Nation merged with the ticketing firm Ticketmaster to form a larger conglomerate named Live Nation Entertainment, with both brand names continuing to operate as subsidiaries of Live Nation Entertainment.

== History ==
=== Early years ===
The company was originally established in 1996 as SFX Entertainment, a subsidiary of media executive Robert F. X. Sillerman's SFX Broadcasting. During the late 1990s, SFX acquired a number of concert promoters, including Sunshine Promotions, The Entertainment Group, and Avalon Entertainment Partners. In 2000, Sillerman sold SFX to Clear Channel Communications for $4.4 billion. In 2005, Clear Channel spun off its entertainment division and named the new company Live Nation. Michael Rapino was appointed as the company's CEO.

=== 2006 to 2009 ===
After spinning off from Clear Channel, Live Nation acquired companies in the music industry while selling off other lines of business. The company acquired the House of Blues chain in 2006. Live Nation also made several international acquisitions between 2006 and 2009, including Gamerco, a concert promoter based in Spain. In January 2008, Live Nation sold its North American theatrical business (including the Broadway Across America business) to Key Brand Entertainment for $90.4 million. Also in September 2008, Feld Entertainment acquired its motorsports division.

=== Merger with Ticketmaster ===
In February 2009, Live Nation announced that it had reached an agreement to merge with the ticket broker Ticketmaster in a $2.5 billion, all-stock deal.

The proposal initially received regulatory approval in Norway and Turkey. In October 2009, the United Kingdom's Competition Commission provisionally ruled against the merger with Ticketmaster. The Competition Commission later cleared the merger on December 22, 2009.

The United States Department of Justice approved the merger in 2010. A condition of the approval, Ticketmaster agreed to license its software to rival Anschutz Entertainment Group, and to sell its subsidiary Paciolan to Comcast Spectacor, Comcast's sporting events subsidiary. The company also agreed not to interfere with competition for the ten-year life of the agreement.

In response to the merger, music artist Bruce Springsteen wrote in a post on his website, "the one thing that would make the current ticket situation even worse for the fan than it is now would be Ticketmaster and Live Nation coming up with a single system, thereby returning us to a near monopoly situation in music ticketing." Additionally, Ticketdisaster.org, a coalition of consumer rights and anti-trust groups, released a statement opposing the merger.

=== 2011 to present ===
Live Nation made acquisitions following the merger with Ticketmaster. In 2011, it acquired the remaining 25% of Front Line Management Group Inc., an artist management firm that was majority owned by Ticketmaster. Also in 2011, Live Nation acquired online measurement company Big Champagne. In June 2013, Insomniac Events, a promoter focused on electronic dance music, announced a major "creative partnership" with Live Nation, giving the promoter access to Live Nation's resources while remaining an independent company. Live Nation did not take any ownership stake in Insomniac.

In December 2015, Live Nation launched Live Nation Productions, a film and television division. In 2018, Live Nation Productions produced A Star Is Born, which starred Lady Gaga and Bradley Cooper.

Live Nation has acquired a stake in a number of festivals and festival management companies, including Voodoo Music & Arts Experience and Bonnaroo Music and Arts Festival. In 2016, Live Nation partnered with Jägermeister to sponsor six electronic dance music festivals. The company has also sponsored Music Midtown, a music festival based in Atlanta. In 2017, Live Nation acquired BottleRock Napa Valley music festival.

In late 2019, Live Nation announced "Lawn Pass", a one-time fee program for concertgoers to attend all 2020 events in the lawn section at 29 outdoor amphitheaters in the United States.

The company has agreed to match a $500,000 donation by singer Lizzo to Planned Parenthood in response to the Supreme Court decision to overturn Roe vs. Wade.

== Controversies ==
According to a Houston Chronicle investigative report, Live Nation had been linked to at least 750 injuries and around 200 deaths at its events in seven countries since 2006. The company has been under scrutiny by federal regulators for work safety and antitrust violations.

In May 2024, the company confirmed rumours of a massive (1.3 TB) data leak, at subsidiary Ticketmaster, The leak was attributed to the malicious efforts of ShinyHunters, a hacker group who allegedly targeted the company's Snowflake (cloud-based) infrastructure. The incident led to a class action lawsuit.

== Artists and venues ==
Live Nation has an artist management division called Artist Nation. In October 2007, Live Nation reached a 10-year deal with Madonna, under which the company would collaborate on several facets of her career, including touring and merchandising.

In March 2008, it was confirmed that Live Nation signed a 12-year deal with U2 worth an estimated $100 million (£70 million). The parties agreed that the band would receive $25 million for 1.6 million shares of the company; as of 17 December 2008, those shares were worth only just over $6 million. It was reported on 18 December 2008 that Live Nation, honoring their financial commitment, bought back the shares at a loss of $19 million.

In July 2008, Shakira signed an estimated $70–100 million contract with Live Nation. The same year, Live Nation signed a 3-tour deal with Canadian rock band, Nickelback. Also in 2008, a deal between Jay-Z and Live Nation for $152 million was confirmed. The deal covered financing of Jay-Z's own entertainment venture, live shows, tours and future recordings. Jay-Z signed a second 10-year deal with Live Nation in 2017.

Live Nation owns several venues and venue chains, including the House of Blues chain of clubs. The company also owns amphitheaters and operates several venues that it does not own.

== Live Nation Productions ==
In 2016, Live Nation started Live Nation Productions, a film and TV production company that makes music-driven documentaries and narrative films.

=== Narrative Films ===
Year	Title	Director	Writer(s)	Distributor
2018	The After Party	Ian Edelman		Netflix
2018	A Star Is Born	Bradley Cooper	Eric Roth, Bradley Cooper, and Will Fetters (adaptation)	Warner Bros. Pictures
2025	Hurry Up Tomorrow	Trey Edward Shults	Trey Edward Shults, Abel Tesfaye, and Reza Fahim	Lionsgate Films
2026	K-Pops!	Anderson .Paak		Aura Entertainment
2026	Rolling Loud	Jeremy Garelick		Ketchup Entertainment
TBD	New Years Rev	Lee Kirk		TBD
TBD	Girl Group	Rebel Wilson		TBD
TBD	The Big Kill	Todd Berger	Daniel Radosh	TBD

=== Documentaries/Concert Films ===
Year	Title	Subject	Director(s)	Distributor
2016	Justin Timberlake + The Tennessee Kids	Justin Timberlake + The Tennessee Kids	Jonathan Demme	Netflix
2017	Eagles of Death Metal: Nos Amis (Our Friends)	Eagles of Death Metal	Colin Hanks	HBO
2017	Gaga: Five Foot Two	Lady Gaga	Chris Moukarbel	Netflix
2017	Can't Stop, Won't Stop: A Bad Boy Story	Bad Boy Records/The Notorious B.I.G.	Daniel Kaufman	Apple Music
2018	Believer	Dan Reynolds/LGBT people/LDS Church	Don Argott	HBO
2019	Between Me And Me Mind	Trey Anastasio	Steven Cantor	Released independently
2020	All I Can Say	Shannon Hoon	Shannon Hoon, Danny Clinch, Taryn Gould, and Colleen Hennessy	Oscilloscope Laboratories
2021	Truth to Power	Serj Tankian	Garin Hovannisian	Oscilloscope Laboratories
2021	Triumph: Rock & Roll Machine	Triumph	Sam Dunn and Marc Ricciardelli	WaZabi Films
2022	Moonage Daydream	David Bowie	Brett Morgen	Neon
2022	Love, Lizzo	Lizzo	Doug Pray	HBO Max
2024	Jerry Lee Lewis: Trouble in Mind	Jerry Lee Lewis	Ethan Coen	Amazon Prime Video
2024	The French Montana Story: For Khadija	French Montana	Mandon Lovett	Paramount+
2025	Miley Cyrus: Something Beautiful	Miley Cyrus	Miley Cyrus, Jacob Bixenman, and Brendan Walter	Trafalgar Releasing and Sony Music Vision
2025	Rebbeca	Becky G	Gabriela Cavanagh and Jennifer Tiexiera	Trafalgar Releasing
TBD	Billy Idol Should Be Dead	Billy Idol	Jonas Åkerlund	Fremantle
TBD	Still Free TC	Ty Dolla Sign/Gabriel "TC" Griffin	Unknown	TBD
TBD	Untitled Noah Kahan Documentary	Noah Kahan	Nick Sweeney	TBD

=== TV Shows ===
Year(s)	Title	Creator	Distributor
2020-2023	Growing Belushi	Jim Belushi and James Orr	Discovery Channel
2021	From Cradle to Stage	Dave Grohl	Paramount+
2024	Hip Hop World	N/A	Amazon Prime Video

== International ==
Between 2011 and 2013, Live Nation acquired companies in Dubai, Australia, New Zealand, and the UK.

=== Venues and artist promotion ===
Live Nation owns and manages several international venues, including the Queen Elizabeth Olympic Park in London, England, and 3Arena in Ireland. It also owns Ticketmaster and MCD Productions in Ireland. In March 2007 Live Nation/Gaiety bought a majority share in 10 music venues from the Academy Music Group, which owns venues including the Brixton Academy, Shepherds Bush Empire, and others.

In 2017, Live Nation acquired a majority stake in Israeli promoter Bluestone Entertainment.

In Ireland, Live Nation entered into a 50/50 joint venture with Gaiety Investments in 2018, called LN-Gaiety. Gaiety owned MCD Productions. LN-Gaiety has made a number of acquisitions, including the Academy Group and MAMA & Co. in 2015.

The company owns several international artist and venue management firms, including former Welldone Agency & Promotions in Finland (Live Nation Finland), EMA Telstar Group in Sweden (Live Nation Sweden), Gunnar Eide Concerts in Norway (Live Nation Norway), Mojo Concerts in the Netherlands, and Swedish EDM promoter Stureplansgruppen Live.

In Australia, Live Nation Australia owns the operating rights for several live music venues, including the Palais Theatre in Melbourne, the Fortitude Music Hall in Brisbane, Hindley Street Music Hall in Adelaide, and Anita's Theatre in the regional NSW town of Thirroul.

In January 2024 it was reported that Live Nation Ireland had lost €6 million in 2022.

=== Festivals ===
The company acquired several international festivals and festival management firms in 2016, including the Sweden Rock Festival; Australia's Secret Sounds Group; and Union Events, an Alberta-owned festival and concert promotion company.

As of 2019 Live Nation owns a majority stake in Festival Republic, a UK concert promoter, that organises festivals such as the Reading and Leeds Festivals, Isle of Wight Festival, and Latitude.

Other festivals owned by Live Nation include the Download Festival at Donington Park in Leicestershire, England; Rhythm & Vines in New Zealand; Wireless Festival in London, England; and Blockfest in Tampere, Finland.

== See also ==
- Dark pattern
- Drip pricing
- Foot-in-the-door technique
- Instant Live
- Junk fee
- LiveStyle
- Resort fee
