= John Gore Organization =

American theater company

- Founded: 2004
- Type: Theatre company
- Location: United States
- Owner: John Gore
- President: Lauren Reid
- Website: johngore.org

The John Gore Organization (JGO), formerly known as Key Brand Entertainment (KBE), is a producer and distributor of live theater in North America as well as an e-commerce company focused on theater. KBE was founded in the UK in 2004 by 14-time Tony Award-winning producer John Gore who is the company's chairman, CEO and owner.

== History ==
The company is a successor to a number of theatrical production and distribution companies acquired through acquisition or merger. These include: Livent, Clear Channel Entertainment, PACE Theatrical Group, Magicworks, and others. As such, it retains interests in numerous Broadway productions and various related rights. The company was amalgamated into Broadway Across America under Clear Channel Communication's ownership. Broadway Across America became a business unit of Live Nation, Inc. following the spin-off of Live Nation from Clear Channel Communications on December 25, 2005. Clear Channel had acquired the assets of SFX Entertainment, which was owned primarily by Robert F. X. Sillerman, and consisted of live concert venues and amphitheaters devoted primarily to rock music in February 2000.

SFX Entertainment, in turn, was founded by Sillerman in order to "roll up" businesses associated with live entertainment, principally rock music. He began by acquiring Delsner/Slater Concerts in 1996 and a number of acquisitions followed rapidly thereafter. Sillerman's entry into theater began with the acquisition of PACE Theatrical Group in October 1997. In September 1998, SFX acquired Magicworks Entertainment, Inc. The Miami-based company promoted concerts and managed touring events such as magician David Copperfield and musicals Jekyll & Hyde and Evita and had been a partner of PACE Theatricals for some time. PACE, in turn, was controlled by Texas-based theater veteran Allen Becker. Also acquired was production company American Artists, which controlled several theaters in the Boston area including the historic Colonial Theater. Magicworks had been controlled by Lee D. Marshall and Joe Marsh (Lee and Marsh later reunited in the company Magic Arts & Entertainment). The summer of 1999 saw court approval granted for a purchase of the bankrupt Livent (then controlled by Canadian entrepreneur Garth Drabinsky and CAA founder Mike Ovitz), a deal that had been initiated a year earlier. Livent, once one of the premier theatrical production companies, owned such touring shows as Ragtime and Fosse, as well as a number of venues in Canada and the United States. Its bankruptcy had been attributed to widespread accounting fraud. In early 2000 SFX acquired Jujamcyn Productions of Minneapolis, a touring theatrical production company. SFX already owned half of Jujamcyn, acquired through PACE Entertainment.

On December 16, 2010, Key Brand completed the acquisition of Theater Direct International from Hollywood Media Corp. for an announced price of US$43.1 million (equivalent to $62 million in 2025) in cash and other consideration, Theater Direct owned and operated the content-driven e-commerce websites Broadway.com, Theater.com, Theatre.com, and Theatre.co.uk. In May 2012, Key Brand completed the acquisition of BroadwayBox.com, a website for discount theater tickets in New York. That December, Key Brand completed the acquisition of Group Sales Box Office (GSBO), the a group-sales ticket agency.

In March 2020, when COVID-19 shuttered Broadway; when the shutdown was extended in April, the John Gore Organization (JGO) announced that individuals who had purchased their tickets through one of its platforms (Broadway.com and Broadway Across America), had the option to donate the value of their unused tickets to Broadway Cares/Equity Fights AIDS and the COVID-19 Emergency Assistance Fund, raising $1 million (equivalent to $1.2 million in 2025) by November 2020. Including other fundraising efforts created by JGO, and a direct contribution by the company, the total by year-end 2020 was more than $2.6 million (equivalent to $3.1 million in 2025).

In 2020, the Gore family introduced a social and web programming to raise awareness of the anti-racism movement, reaching upwards of 3 million Broadway fans.

=== Assets ===
The company's assets include:

- Broadway Across America (BAA) a major theater touring organization in North America acquired in 2008. With over 400,000 season subscribers, BAA has earned 248 Tony Awards in over 35 years of producing and investing in Broadway shows. BAA owns and/or operates five theaters in Boston, Baltimore, and Minneapolis.
- Broadway.com, a ticketing site, with the 2010 acquisition of Theatre Direct NY. In 2018, Broadway.com won a New York Emmy for its production of At The Tonys with Imogen Lloyd Webber for WCBS-TV. Broadway.com also hosts and presents the Broadway.com Audience Choice Awards annually.
- Group Sales Box Office, merged with Broadway.com/Groups in 2012.
- BroadwayBox.com, a Broadway ticket discounter, was acquired in 2013.
- The Broadway Channel, a video content brand acquired in 2015.
- Hammer Films and Studios acquired in August 2023.

Philanthropically, JGO has supported The Arthur Miller Foundation with a grant to provide theater educators in NYC Public Schools. In 2017, JGO raised US$500,000 (equivalent to $657,000 in 2025) for Hurricane Maria relief in Puerto Rico by producing a benefit performance of Thornton Wilder's Our Town starring Scarlett Johansson, Jeremy Renner, Mark Ruffalo, Robert Downey Jr. and Chris Evans. It was announced in September 2018 that JGO pledged $100,000 (equivalent to $128,000 in 2025) to the T. Fellowship at Columbia University, a program that fosters new creative producers. In April 2021, the John Gore Organization became a founding partner in The Theatre Leadership Project to train and mentor a new generation of Black theater industry leaders. In January 2022, JGO launched the Black Theatre Coalition/Broadway Across America Fellowship program, the first national Broadway fellowship program designed to provide an introduction to the Broadway industry for aspiring BIPOC theater professionals.

== Awards ==
As the John Gore Organization, the company was awarded several awards including Tony Awards and Drama Desk Awards:

As the John Gore Organization

- Moulin Rouge! The Musical - 2020 Tony Award for Best Musical
- Special Event Coverage (other than news and sports) - 2020 New York Emmy Award At the Tonys with Imogen Lloyd Webber
- Broadway Profiles, Magazine Program (series) - 2020 New York Emmy Award
- Oklahoma! - 2019 Tony Award for Best Revival of a Musical
- The Prom (musical) - 2019 Drama Desk Award for Outstanding Musical
- The Waverly Gallery - 2019 Drama Desk Award for Outstanding Revival of a Play
- The Band's Visit – 2018 Tony Award for Best Musical
- Angels in America – 2018 Tony Award for Best Revival of a Play; Drama Desk Award
- Dear Evan Hansen – 2017 Tony Award for Best Musical
- Hello, Dolly! – 2017 Tony Award for Best Revival of a Musical; Drama Desk Award
- A View From The Bridge – 2016 Tony Award for Best Revival of a Play; Drama Desk Award

As Broadway Across America

- The Humans – 2016 Tony Award for Best Play; Drama Desk Award
- Pippin – 2013 Tony Award for Best Revival of a Musical; Drama Desk Award
- The Gershwins' Porgy and Bess – 2012 Tony Award for Best Revival of a Musical
- War Horse – 2011 Tony Award for Best Play; Drama Desk Award
- Memphis — 2010 Tony Award for Best New Musical; Drama Desk Award
- La Cage Aux Folles — 2010 Tony Award for Best Revival of a Musical; Drama Desk Award
- Hair — 2009 Tony Award for Best Revival of a Musical; Drama Desk Award
- Spring Awakening — 2009 Olivier Award for Best New Musical in London
- Passing Strange — 2009 Drama Desk Award for Best New Play
- Boeing-Boeing — 2008 Tony Award for Best Revival of a Play; Drama Desk Award

Previously and under different names

- Spamalot — 2005 Tony Award for Best New Musical (as Clear Channel)
- Hairspray — 2003 Tony Award for Best New Musical (as Clear Channel)
- The Producers — 2002 Tony Award for Best New Musical (as Clear Channel)
- Fosse — 1999 Tony Award for Best New Musical (as Livent)
- Chicago — 1997 Tony Award for Best Revival of a Musical (as Pace Theatrical)
- Showboat — 1995 Tony Award for Best Revival of a Musical (as Livent)
- Kiss of the Spiderwoman — 1993 Tony Award for Best New Musical (as Livent)
- Fiddler on the Roof — 1991 Tony Award for Best Revival of a Musical (as Pace Theatrical)
- Gypsy — 1990 Tony Award for Best Revival of a Musical (as Pace Theatrical)
- Jerome Robbins Broadway — 1989 Tony Award for Best New Musical (as Pace Theatrical)
