= Weird Travels =

- Genre: Documentary; Paranormal
- Written by: Helga Eike; Sarah Wetherbee
- Directed by: Emre Sahin
- Starring: Loren Coleman
- Narrated by: Don Wildman
- Theme music composer: Wild Woods, Inc.
- Composer: Donn Wilkerson
- Country of origin: United States
- Original language: English

Production
- Executive producers: Tom Rogan; Lauren Lexton
- Producers: Helga Eike; Sarah Wetherbee; Nancy Gunn (sup. prod); Karen Olson (line)
- Editors: Andrew Covell; Mike Mahoney
- Running time: 45 minutes
- Production company: Authentic Entertainment

Original release
- Network: Travel Channel
- Release: August 16, 2001 – December 20, 2006

Weird Travels is an American documentary paranormal television series that originally aired from 2001 to 2006 on the Travel Channel. Produced by Authentic Entertainment, the program features various paranormal subjects around the world, especially monsters and purportedly haunted locations around the world. The series is narrated by Don Wildman, who also hosts and narrates History's documentary television series Cities of the Underworld and Travel Channel's Off Limits.

== Synopsis ==
Weird Travels purpose is to investigate and uncover some of the biggest mysteries in the world. The series features anything from paranormal-related to things out of the ordinary by traveling the globe to discover the truth on these subjects. Each episode consists of a certain theme: such as creepy creatures like the Loch Ness Monster and Bigfoot, exploring mysterious civilizations like the Maya and the Nazca, and searching for clues in the age old legend of the Holy Grail to the present phenomena of crop circles and UFOs.

== Series overview ==
Season	Episodes	Originally aired	
Season	Episodes	Season premiere	Season finale
1	26	August 16, 2001	December 20, 2006

== Episodes ==
No.	Title	Original release date
1	"America's Most Haunted Places: San Francisco"	August 16, 2001
In the series premiere, this episode explores supernatural locations in San Francisco, California including the Winchester Mystery House, the USS Hornet, and Alcatraz Island.
2	"Bigfootville"	October 15, 2002
This episode features a small town in Oklahoma where a large number of Bigfoot sightings have been documented with recordings.
3	"Investigations of the Unexplained"	October 16, 2003
This special episode features an exorcism in Maryland when demonic possession is involved, ghosts of Louisiana's Myrtles Plantation, Wisconsin's Werewolves, California's haunted USS Hornet, and Oregon's Bigfoot.
4	"Spirits of the South"	October 28, 2004
An Egyptian curse that is rumored to still cast a spell on Memphis, Tennessee, strange creatures lurk near Graystone Cabins in Barnardsville, North Carolina in the western part of the state, and a haunted steamboat in New Orleans.
5	"The Wicked West"	November 27, 2004
The Weird, Wild West transports us to the legendary ghost towns, saloons, inns, and ceremonies haunted by the legends of the Old West. A haunted mining town and its ghost that roams the Santa Cruz Mountains is also featured.
6	"Mysteries of Route 66"	January 15, 2005
Meet more than just a few "living" remnants along the most historic road in America's history.
7	"Phantoms of the Opera"	January 22, 2005
Every good theater has a ghost, join us as we peer backstage at some of the country's most haunted theaters.
8	"Haunted Hotels: Where Darkness Dwells"	January 29, 2005
This episode features haunted hotels, including the Brown Palace Hotel in Denver, Colorado, the Marshall House in Savannah, Georgia, the first hotel in town, the Balsam Mountain Inn in Balsam, North Carolina and the Lanaux Mansion, a Victorian bed and breakfast in New Orleans, Louisiana's French Quarter.
9	"Haunted Hotels: Lodging with Spirits"	April 9, 2005
This episode features The Lodge, a haunted hotel in Cloudcroft, New Mexico and the Drake Hotel in Chicago, Illinois.
10	"Haunted Hotels: Shadows of the Past"	June 3, 2005
Locations include; the Archbishop's Mansion in San Francisco, Markree Castle in County Sligo, Ireland, Omni Parker House Hotel in Boston, and Hotel San Carlos in Phoenix are featured. Plus a look at why hotels are haunted.
11	"Spirits of the South"	October 28, 2004
Scarred by a history of piracy, brutal slavery, and bloody Civil War battles, the South is fertile ground for everything strange, unexplained, and paranormal.
12	"Lake Monsters"	October 23, 2005
This episode features the Loch Ness Monster in Scotland and Champ in Lake Champlain.
13	"Signs"	October 23, 2005
This episode features large images that are visible only from the air, like crop circles, Stonehenge, and the Nazca Lines.
14	"Bigfoot"	January 6, 2006
This episode features research on Bigfoot in northern California, Texas, and Florida, where it's known as Skunk Ape.
15	"Creepy Creatures"	January 13, 2006
The Loch Ness Monster, the Lake Champlain Monster, Bigfoot, Mothman, and the Jersey Devil are all investigated, including the Men in Black's involvement with Mothman.
16	"Mystery Spots"	January 20, 2006
This episode features the mysteries of Machu Picchu, Peru and Sedona, Arizona.
17	"Alien Encounters"	January 27, 2006
This episode features people who witnessed alien encounters around the world.
18	"UFO"	January 27, 2006
This episode features UFO sightings around the globe.
19	"The Quest for the Holy Grail"	May 25, 2006
From the magnificent carved symbols of Scotland's Rosslyn Chapel to mysterious codes hidden in books and monuments across England, we’ll track down secret clues to find out what the Holy Grail actually is and where it might be concealed.
20	"New Mexico's Visitors"	October 4, 2006
Most of the paranormal attention in New Mexico has focused on Roswell and the alleged alien activity there, but, there's plenty of unexplained phenomena to go around, and aliens aren't the only strange visitors to make their presence felt.
21	"Creepy Capital City"	October 9, 2006
While the city is known for its spirit of democracy, there are ghostly spirits in the city that have elected to stay behind to have their voices heard.
22	"Haunted Campuses"	October 10, 2006
Murders, suicides, broken hearts, failed exams...much history is buried beneath the thick stone walls of college dorms, libraries, gymnasiums and dining halls.
23	"Frightening Florida"	October 16, 2006
While Mickey Mouse invites tourists to visit his Haunted Mansion at Walt Disney World, very real haunted houses have been terrorizing Florida residents for centuries.
24	"Mystery of the Mayas"	December 6, 2006
From Mexico's Yucatán Peninsula south to Belize, the Maya vanished hundreds of years ago. But where did they go? And what did they know? Search the dense jungles, ancient ruins and underworld for secrets to help unlock the great mystery of the Maya.
25	"Bizarre Boston"	December 13, 2006
We’ll visit the ghosts of Boston and beyond, whose presence and as much a part of the city's history as tea parties and beans.
26	"Chicago Haunts"	December 20, 2006
Beyond the Sears Tower and the Magnificent Mile lies some of the scariest sites in America.

== See also ==
- Cryptozoology
- Cryptid
- Paranormal television
