= Dexter (TV series) =

American crime drama TV series (2006–2013)

- Genre: Crime; Psychological thriller; Mystery; Black comedy; Police procedural; Inverted detective story
- Based on: Darkly Dreaming Dexter by Jeff Lindsay
- Developed by: James Manos Jr.
- Showrunners: Clyde Phillips (seasons 1–4); Chip Johannessen (season 5); Scott Buck (seasons 6–8)
- Starring: Michael C. Hall; Julie Benz; Jennifer Carpenter; Erik King; Lauren Vélez; David Zayas; James Remar; C. S. Lee; Desmond Harrington; Aimee Garcia; Geoff Pierson
- Theme music composer: Rolfe Kent
- Composer: Daniel Licht
- Country of origin: United States
- Original language: English
- No. of seasons: 8
- No. of episodes: 96 (list of episodes)

Production
- Executive producers: James Manos Jr.; Sara Colleton; John Goldwyn; Charles H. Eglee; Michael C. Hall; Chip Johannessen; Clyde Phillips; Manny Coto; Wendy West; Tim Schlattmann; Melissa Rosenberg; Jace Richdale; Scott Buck
- Producers: Timothy Schlattmann; Lauren Gussis; Arika Lisanne Mittman; Drew Z. Greenberg; Scott Reynolds; Dennis Bishop
- Production locations: Miami, Florida, U.S.; Long Beach, California, U.S.
- Cinematography: Terry Stacey; Romeo Tirone; Martin J. Layton; Jeffrey Jur
- Running time: 47–66 minutes
- Production companies: The Colleton Company; John Goldwyn Productions; Clyde Phillips Productions; 801 Productions; Devilina Productions; Showtime Networks

Original release
- Network: Showtime
- Release: October 1, 2006 – September 22, 2013

Related
- Dexter: New Blood; Dexter: Original Sin; Dexter: Resurrection

Dexter is an American crime television series that initially aired on Showtime from October 1, 2006, to September 22, 2013. Set in Miami, the series centers on Dexter Morgan (Michael C. Hall), a forensic technician specializing in bloodstain pattern analysis for the fictional Miami Metro Police Department, who leads a secret parallel life as a vigilante serial killer, hunting down murderers inadequately punished by the justice system due to corruption or legal technicalities. The show's first season was derived from the novel Darkly Dreaming Dexter (2004), the first in a series of novels by Jeff Lindsay. It was adapted for television by James Manos Jr., who wrote the pilot episode.

The series received mostly positive reviews throughout its run. The show has received multiple awards, including two Golden Globes won by Michael C. Hall and John Lithgow for their roles as Dexter Morgan and Arthur Mitchell, respectively.

The fourth season aired its season finale on December 13, 2009, to a record-breaking audience of 2.6 million viewers, making it the most-watched original series episode ever on Showtime at that time. The eighth season originally served as the final season of Dexter ; the season premiere was the most-watched episode of the series, drawing more than 3 million viewers total. The series finale drew 2.8 million viewers, which at the time set a record for the largest audience for an original series finale in Showtime's history. It has been cited as one of the greatest television series of all time.

Dexter has continued through an expanded franchise with further series. Two sequel series, Dexter: New Blood and Dexter: Resurrection, have aired from November 2021 to January 2022, and from July 2025, respectively, with Hall reprising the title role and Clyde Phillips as showrunner. A prequel series, Dexter: Original Sin, was released between December 2024 and February 2025, starring Patrick Gibson as Dexter.

== Plot ==
Orphaned at age three, when he witnessed his mother's brutal murder with a chainsaw, Dexter (Michael C. Hall) was adopted by Miami police officer Harrison "Harry" Morgan (James Remar). Recognizing the boy's trauma and the subsequent development of his sociopathic tendencies, Harry trained Dexter to channel his gruesome bloodlust into vigilantism, killing only heinous criminals who slip through the criminal justice system. To cover his prolific trail of homicides, Dexter gains employment as a forensic analyst, specializing in bloodstain pattern analysis, with the Miami Metro Police Department. Dexter is extremely cautious and circumspect; he wears gloves and uses plastic-wrapped "kill rooms", carves up the corpses, and disposes of them in the Atlantic Ocean's Gulf Stream to reduce his chances of detection. Dexter juggles his two personas, recognizing each as a distinct part of himself that must cohesively work as one. He depends on their interaction as a means of survival and normality. Although his homicidal tendencies are deeply unyielding, as he originally claims (via narration), throughout the series he strives to feel (and in some cases does feel) normal emotions and maintains his appearance as a socially responsible human being.

== Episodes ==
The original run of Dexter consists of eight seasons, and aired from October 1, 2006, to September 22, 2013.

Season	Episodes	Originally released	
Season	Episodes	First released	Last released
1	12	October 1, 2006	December 17, 2006
2	12	September 30, 2007	December 16, 2007
3	12	September 28, 2008	December 14, 2008
4	12	September 27, 2009	December 13, 2009
5	12	September 26, 2010	December 12, 2010
6	12	October 2, 2011	December 18, 2011
7	12	September 30, 2012	December 16, 2012
8	12	June 30, 2013	September 22, 2013

== Cast and crew ==
=== Cast ===
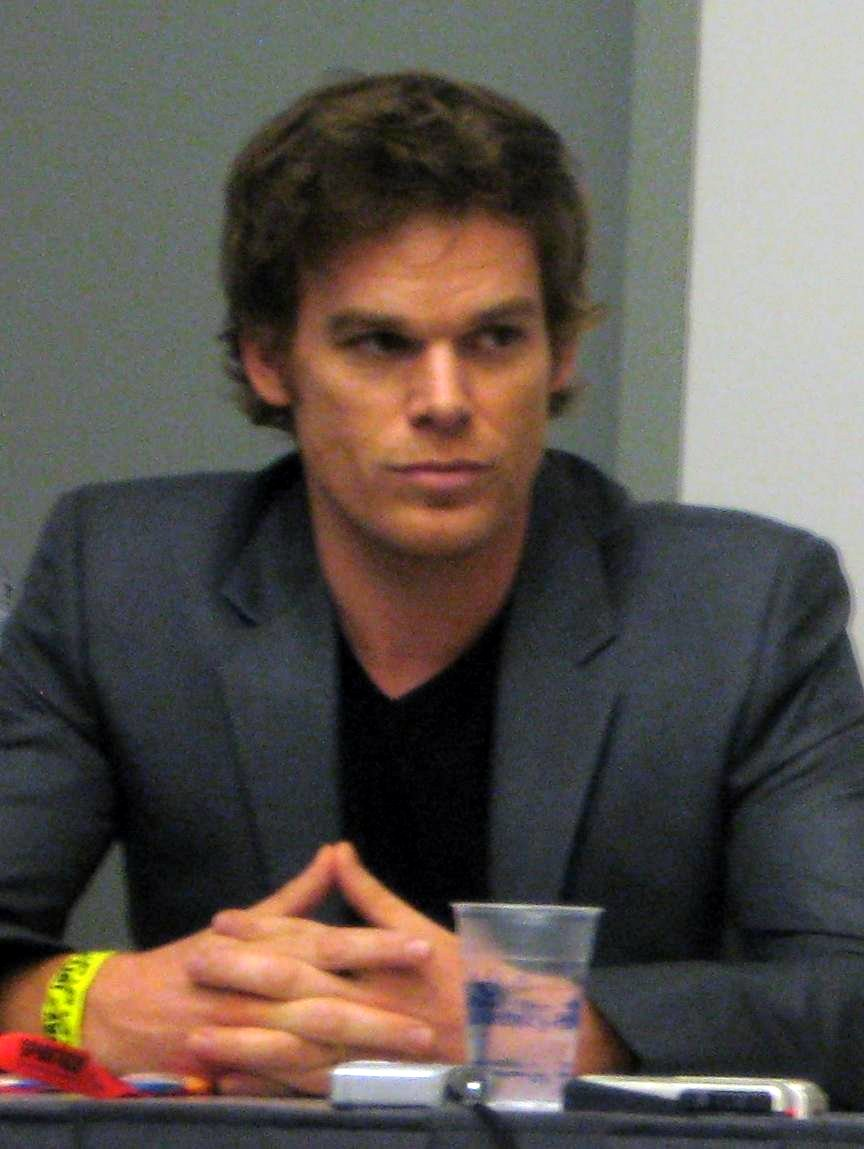
Michael C. Hall plays the title role of Dexter

Besides Hall playing the title character, the show's supporting cast includes Jennifer Carpenter as Dexter's adoptive sister and co-worker (and later boss) Debra, and James Remar as Dexter's adoptive father, Harry Morgan. Dexter's co-workers include Lauren Vélez as Lieutenant (later Captain) María LaGuerta, Dexter and Debra's supervisor, David Zayas as Detective Sergeant (later Lieutenant) Angel Batista, and C. S. Lee as lab tech Vince Masuka (promoted to title credits in season two).

Erik King portrayed the troubled Sergeant James Doakes for the show's first two seasons. Desmond Harrington joined the cast in season three as Joey Quinn; his name was promoted to the title credits as of season four. Geoff Pierson plays Captain Tom Matthews of Miami Metro Homicide. Julie Benz starred as Dexter's girlfriend, then wife, Rita in seasons one to four, with a guest appearance in season five. Rita's children, Astor and Cody, are played by Christina Robinson and Preston Bailey (who replaced Daniel Goldman after the first season). Dexter's infant son Harrison is played by twins, Evan and Luke Kruntchev, through season seven; in season eight, Harrison was played by Jadon Wells. Aimee Garcia plays Batista's younger sister, Jamie.

Notable appearances in season one are Christian Camargo as Brian and Mark Pellegrino as Rita's abusive ex-husband Paul. Camargo reprised his role in seasons two and six while Pellegrino returned as a guest star in season two. Jaime Murray portrayed Lila West in season two, a physically attractive but unhinged British artist who becomes obsessed with Dexter. Keith Carradine, as Special FBI Agent Frank Lundy, and Jimmy Smits, as ADA Miguel Prado, each appeared in season-long character arcs in seasons two and three, respectively. David Ramsey, who plays confidential informant Anton Briggs in season three, returned in season four, becoming romantically involved with Debra Morgan. John Lithgow joined the cast in season four as the "Trinity Killer". Carradine returned in season four, reprising his role as newly retired FBI Special Agent Frank Lundy, who was hunting the Trinity Killer. Courtney Ford was featured in season four as Christine Hill, an ambitious reporter who becomes romantically involved with Quinn while simultaneously fishing for sources and stories. Julia Stiles joined the cast in season five as Lumen Pierce, a woman who gets involved in a complex relationship with Dexter after the tragedy that culminated the previous season. Season five also had Jonny Lee Miller cast as the motivational speaker Jordan Chase, Peter Weller cast as Stan Liddy, a corrupt narcotics cop, and Maria Doyle Kennedy cast as Sonya, Harrison's nanny. In season six, Mos Def was cast as Brother Sam, a convicted murderer turned born-again Christian, and Edward James Olmos and Colin Hanks guest-starred as Professor James Gellar and Travis Marshall, members of a murderous apocalyptic cult. Seasons seven and eight featured multiple guest stars, including Ray Stevenson as Ukrainian mob boss Isaak Sirko, a man with a personal vendetta against Dexter; Yvonne Strahovski as Hannah McKay, the former accomplice of a spree killer; Jason Gedrick as strip club owner George Novikov, also part of the mob; and Charlotte Rampling as Dr. Evelyn Vogel, a neuropsychiatrist who takes an interest in Dexter; Ronny Cox as the Tooth Fairy killer; and Sean Patrick Flanery as Jacob Elway, a private investigator for whom Debra works.

Margo Martindale had a recurring role as Camilla Figg, a records office worker who was a close friend of Dexter's adoptive parents. JoBeth Williams portrayed Rita's suspicious mother, Gail Brandon, in four episodes of season two. Anne Ramsay portrayed defense attorney Ellen Wolf, Miguel's nemesis. Valerie Cruz played a recurring role as Miguel's wife, Sylvia. In season six, Billy Brown was cast as transferred-in Detective Mike Anderson to replace Debra after her promotion to lieutenant. Josh Cooke played Louis Greene, a laboratory technician and Masuka's intern, in seasons six and seven, and Darri Ingolfsson played Oliver Saxon in season eight.

=== Crew ===
The main creative forces behind the series were executive producers Daniel Cerone, Clyde Phillips, and Melissa Rosenberg. Cerone left the show after its second season. Executive producer and showrunner Phillips departed the series, after a record-setting season-four finale, to spend more time with his family; 24 co-executive producer Chip Johannessen took over Phillips' post. Head writer Melissa Rosenberg left after season four, as well.

After the conclusion of season five, Chip Johannessen was revealed to be leaving the show after a single run, and Scott Buck would take over as showrunner from season six onward.

== Production ==
=== Exterior filming ===
Although the series is set in Miami, Florida, many of the exterior scenes are filmed in Los Angeles and Long Beach, California. Many landmark buildings and locations in Long Beach are featured throughout the series. The finale episode's airport scene takes place at Ontario International Airport in Ontario, California.

While many of the exterior scenes are filmed in Los Angeles and Long Beach, California, so are many interior scenes. For example, many of the locations seen in season six of the show, which features the "Doomsday Killer" as that season's prominent serial killer, are filmed on the campus of California State University Long Beach. Featured locations include the school, such as the McIntosh Humanities Building, the Beach Auditorium in the University Student Union building, and the Liberal Arts/ Fine Arts buildings. From the same season, the production of the show also were shot at or featured historic buildings in Long Beach, including the Villa Riviera and the Abbey San Encino, which is a now private home but constructed to uniquely mimic the Californian missions and a medieval style of architecture.

=== Marketing ===
In preparation for the United Kingdom launch of the series, Fox UK experimented with an SMS-based viral marketing campaign. Mobile phone owners received unsolicited SMS messages addressed to them by name with no identifying information other than being from "Dexter", such as, "Hello (name). I'm heading to the UK sooner than you might think. Dexter." The SMS message was followed by an email directing the user to an online video "news report" about a recent spree of killings. Using on-the-fly video manipulation, the user's name and a personalized message were worked into the report—the former written in blood on a wall near the crime scene, the latter added to a note in an evidence bag carried past the camera. While the marketing campaign raised the show's profile, it proved unpopular with many mobile owners, who saw this as spam advertising aimed at mobile phones. In response to complaints about the SMS element of the campaign, Fox issued this statement:

The text message you received was part of an internet viral campaign for our newest show Dexter. However, it was not us who sent you the text, but one of your friends. We do not have a database of viewer phone numbers. The text message went along with a piece on the net that you can then send on to other people you know. If you go to [the website] you will see the page that one of your friends has filled in to send you that message. Therefore, I suggest you have a word with anyone who knows your mobile number and see who sent you this message. For the record, we did not make a record of any phone numbers used in this campaign.

== Reception ==
=== Critical reception ===
Critical response of Dexter
Season	Rotten Tomatoes	Metacritic
1	83% (36 reviews)	77 (27 reviews)
2	96% (23 reviews)	85 (11 reviews)
3	72% (25 reviews)	78 (13 reviews)
4	88% (34 reviews)	77 (14 reviews)
5	84% (25 reviews)	76 (11 reviews)
6	38% (26 reviews)	62 (10 reviews)
7	79% (24 reviews)	81 (7 reviews)
8	35% (46 reviews)	71 (10 reviews)

Although reception to individual seasons has varied, the overall response to Dexter has been positive. The first, second, fourth, and seventh seasons received critical acclaim, the third and fifth seasons received generally positive reviews, while the sixth and eighth seasons received mixed to negative reviews. While remarking on some of the show's more formulaic elements (quirky detective, hero with dense workmates, convenient plot contrivances), Tad Friend of The New Yorker magazine remarked that when Dexter is struggling to connect with Rita or soliciting advice from his victims, "the show finds its voice."

The review aggregator website Metacritic calculated a score of 77 from a possible 100 for season one, based on 27 reviews, making it the third-best reviewed show of the 2006 fall season. This score includes four 100% scores (from the New York Daily News, San Francisco Chronicle, Chicago Sun-Times, and People Weekly). Brian Lowry, who had written one of the three poor reviews Metacritic tallied for the show, recanted his negative review in a year-end column for the trade magazine Variety, after watching the full season. On Metacritic, season two has a score of 85 with all 11 reviews positive; season three scored 78 with 13 reviews; season four scored 77 with 14 reviews; season five scored 76 with eleven reviews; season six scored 62 with 10 reviews; season seven scored 81 with seven reviews; and season eight scored 71 with ten reviews.

On Rotten Tomatoes, season one has an 83% approval rating with a score of 8.0 out of 10, and the consensus: "Its dark but novel premise may be too grotesque for some, but Dexter is a compelling, elegantly crafted horror-drama."; season two has a 96% approval rating with a score of 7.6 out of 10 and the consensus: "The Bay Harbor Butcher secures his nefarious spot among the great television antiheroes in a taut second season that is both painfully suspenseful and darkly hilarious"; season three has a 72% approval rating with a score of 8.3 out of 10 and the consensus: "America's most amiable serial killer has lost some of his dramatic edge, but this third outing continues Dexter's streak of delivering deliriously twisted entertainment"; season four has an 88% approval rating with a score of 8.4 out of 10 and the consensus: "The inherent comedy of Miami's favorite psychopath contending with domestic bliss and the unspeakable horror of John Lithgow's Trinity killer coalesce into one of Dexter's most sensational seasons"; season five has an 84% approval rating with a score of 7.5 out of 10 and the consensus: "Michael C. Hall's remarkable performance invites viewers into Dexter's heart of darkness in a sorrowful fifth season that explores whether a hollow man can become a real boy"; season six has a 38% approval rating with a score of 6.3 out of 10 and the consensus: "Heavy-handed symbolism, an unimpressive villain, and a redundant arc for America's favorite serial killer all conspire to make Dexter's sixth season its worst yet"; season seven has a 79% approval rating with a score of 7.5 out of 10 and the consensus: "Season seven represents a return to form for Dexter, characterized by a riveting storyline and a willingness to take some risks"; and season eight has a 33% approval rating, a score of 5.5 out of 10, and the final consensus: "The darkly dreaming Dexter lays to rest once and for all in a bitterly disappointing final season that is so hesitant to punish its antihero for his misdeeds, it opts to punish its audience, instead."

=== Popular reception ===
The season-three finale, on December 14, 2008, was watched by 1.51 million people, giving Showtime its highest ratings for any of its original series since 2004, when Nielsen started including original shows on premium channels in its ratings. The season-four finale, aired on December 13, 2009, was watched by 2.6 million viewers. It broke records for all of Showtime's original series and was their highest-rated telecast in over a decade. The season-five finale was watched by a slightly smaller number of people—2.5 million. The show was declared the ninth-highest rated show for the first ten years of IMDb.com Pro (2002–2012). The seventh season as a whole was the highest-rated season of Dexter, watched by 6.1 million total weekly viewers across all platforms. The season-eight premiere was the most-watched Dexter episode, with more than 3 million viewers in total. The original broadcast of the series finale on September 22, 2013, drew 2.8 million viewers, the largest audience in Showtime's history.

=== Awards and nominations ===
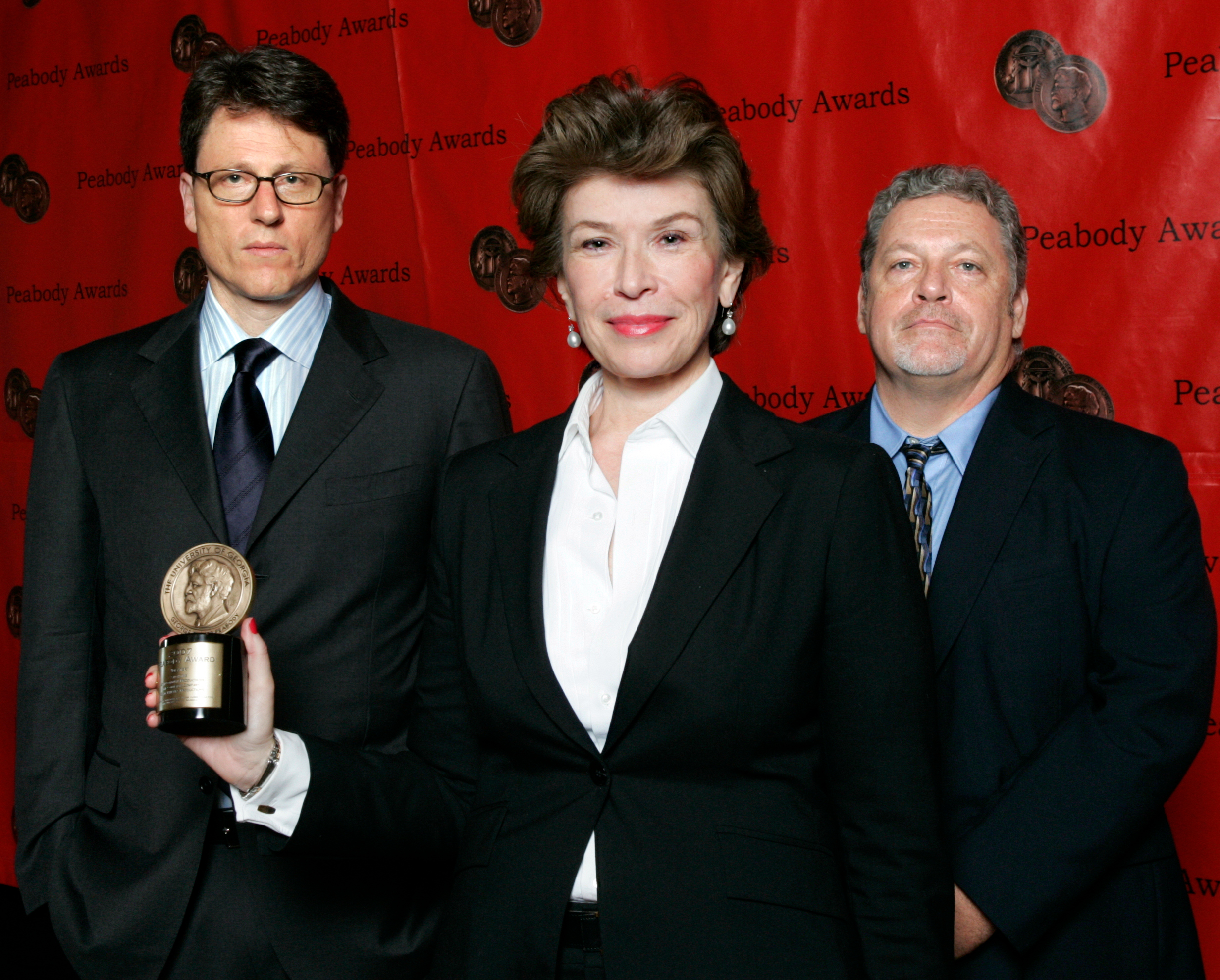
John Goldwyn, Sara Colleton, and Jeff Lindsay at the 67th Annual Peabody Awards for Dexter

Dexter was nominated for 24 Primetime Emmy Awards, including in the category of Outstanding Drama Series four times in a row, from 2008 to 2011, and Outstanding Lead Actor in a Drama Series (for Hall) five times in a row, from 2008 to 2012. It has also been nominated for 10 Golden Globe Awards (winning two) and seven Screen Actors Guild Awards, and received a Peabody Award in 2007.

On December 14, 2006, Hall was nominated for a Golden Globe Award at the 64th Golden Globe Awards. In 2008, the show was nominated for a Primetime Emmy Award for Outstanding Drama Series for its second season (Showtime's first-ever drama to be nominated for the award), and its star for Outstanding Lead Actor in a Drama Series. It won neither, losing to Breaking Bad actor Bryan Cranston. In 2010, Hall and Lithgow, in their respective categories, each won a Golden Globe for their performances in season four.

=== Cultural impact ===
==== American broadcast ====
In December 2007, when CBS publicly announced that it was considering Dexter for broadcast reruns in the wake of the shortage of original programming ensuing from the 2007–08 Writers Guild of America strike, the Parents Television Council ("PTC") protested the decision. When the network began posting promotional videos of the rebroadcast on YouTube on January 29, 2008, PTC president Timothy F. Winter, in a formal press release, again called for CBS not to air the show on broadcast television, saying that it "should remain on a premium subscription cable network" because "the series compels viewers to empathize with a serial killer, to root for him to prevail, to hope he doesn't get discovered." Winters argued that the "consensus of medical opinion is that violent television content can cause long-term and irreparable harm to children." Winter called on the public to demand that local affiliates pre-empt Dexter and warned advertisers that the PTC would take action against any affiliates that sponsored the show.

Following Winter's press release, CBS added parental advisory notices to its broadcast promotions and ultimately rated Dexter TV-14 for broadcast. On February 17, 2008, the show premiered edited primarily for "language" and scenes containing sex or the dismemberment of live victims. The PTC later objected to CBS' broadcasting of the final two episodes of season one in a two-hour block, and to the episodes' starting times, which were as early as 8:00 pm in some time zones.

==== Association with real crimes ====
Several comparisons and connections to the TV show and its protagonist have been drawn during criminal prosecutions. In 2009, 17-year-old Andrew Conley said the show inspired him to strangle his 10-year-old brother. In an affidavit filed in Ohio County court, in Indiana, police said Conley confessed that he "watches a show called Dexter on Showtime, about a serial killer, and he stated, 'I feel just like him.'"

In Spain, on July 25, 2009, a man and his girlfriend killed his brother and pregnant partner. The man owned the complete Dexter series DVD collection and the methods used to avoid leaving blood traces were inspired by the show.

On November 4, 2010, in Sweden, a 21-year-old woman known as Dexter-mördaren ("The Dexter killer") or Dexter-kvinnan ("The Dexter woman") killed her 49-year-old father by stabbing him in the heart. During questioning, the woman compared herself to Dexter Morgan, and a picture of the character would appear on her phone when her father called her. In July 2011, she was sentenced to seven years in prison.

In Norway, Shamrez Khan hired Håvard Nyfløt to kill Faiza Ashraf. Nyfløt claimed that Dexter inspired him, and he wanted to kill Khan in front of Faiza, similar to the television series, to "stop evil."

Association was established between Mark Twitchell, of Edmonton, Alberta, Canada, during his first-degree murder trial, and the character of Dexter Morgan. After weeks of testimony and gruesome evidence presented in court, Twitchell was found guilty of the planned and deliberate murder of 38-year-old Johnny Altinger on April 12, 2011.

British teenager Steven Miles, 17, was sentenced to 25 years in prison on October 2, 2014, for stabbing and dismembering his girlfriend Elizabeth Rose Thomas, 17, in Oxted, Surrey. Police discovered Thomas' body on January 24, 2014, and determined the cause of death to be a stab wound to the back. Miles was arrested on suspicion of murder. Miles pled guilty to the crime on September 9. According to Surrey Police, Miles had dismembered Thomas' body following her death, wrapping up limbs in plastic wrap, and had attempted to clean up the crime scene before he was found by a family member. Miles had been reported to be obsessed with the television series Dexter. Miles reportedly had an alter ego named Ed, who, Miles claims, made him carry out the murder.

On January 11, 2022, in New Orleans, Louisiana, 34-year-old Benjamin Beale was arrested after police discovered a decapitated body inside a freezer in a painted bus. The body was confirmed, over a week later, to be that of Julia Dardar, a missing mother of two children. Investigators soon discovered a Dexter profile painting with guns and knives.

In October 2025, in the city of Ismailia, Egypt, 13-year-old Youssef Ayman killed his 12-year-old classmate Muhammad Mustafa. The accused took advantage of the absence of his father, who works as a carpenter, and used an electric saw to cut the body into six parts, which he placed inside black bags and disposed of in various locations, including the vicinity of the fishermen's lake and an abandoned building in the area. The investigation revealed that the killer was inspired to carry out the crime by the television series Dexter.

The creation of Dexter himself was influenced by a real-world killer named Pedro Rodrigues Filho, who was a Brazilian serial killer who typically killed other criminals. In Brazil, he is commonly known as Pedrinho Matador (Killer Petey). He was charged with 71 counts of murder, but he once claimed to have carried out over 100 kills.

== Theme song and series music ==
The opening title theme for Dexter was written by Rolfe Kent and scored by American composer Daniel Licht. The series music for each episode was overseen by Gary Calamar of Go Music and coordinated by Alyson Vidoli.

- "Dexter Main Title" (Rolfe Kent) – 1:40
- "Tonight's the Night" (Michael C. Hall, Daniel Licht) – 1:07
- "Conoci La Paz" (Beny Moré) – 3:03
- "Uruapan Breaks" (Kinky) – 2:21
- "Flores Para Ti" (Raw Artistic Soul featuring Rafael Cortez) – 5:16
- "Blood" (Michael C. Hall, Daniel Licht) – 0:59
- "Con Mi Guaguanco" (Ray Armando) – 7:12
- "Perfidia" (Mambo All-Stars) – 2:37
- "Sometimes I Wonder" (Michael C. Hall, Daniel Licht) – 0:29
- "Born Free" (Andy Williams) – 2:25
- "Dexter Main Title" (Kinky) – 1:41
- "Escalation" (Daniel Licht) – 2:09
- "Shipyard" (Daniel Licht) – 2:03
- "Deborah Loves Rudy/The House" (Daniel Licht) – 3:12
- "I Can't Kill" (Daniel Licht) – 2:21
- "Voodoo Jailtime" (Daniel Licht) – 2:58
- "New Legs" (Daniel Licht) – 2:01
- "Photo Albums" (Daniel Licht) – 3:22
- "Courting the Night" (Daniel Licht) – 1:22
- "Hide Your Tears" (Daniel Licht) – 1:36
- "Wink" (Daniel Licht) – 2:08
- "Astor's Birthday Party" (Daniel Licht) – 2:00
- "Epilogue/Bloodroom" (Daniel Licht) – 3:44
- "Blood Theme" (Daniel Licht) – 2:25
- "Die This Way" (Daniel Licht, Jon Licht) – 3:55
- "Fight or Flight" (Daniel Licht) – 1:41 (ITunes Bonus)
- "Nowhere to Hide" (Daniel Licht) – 1:43 (ITunes Bonus)
- "The Ice Truck Killer" (Daniel Licht) – 2:56 (ITunes Bonus)
- "The Fortune" (Daniel Licht) – 1:17 (ITunes Bonus)
- "Second Season Suite" (Daniel Licht) – 2:01 (ITunes Bonus)

== Other media ==
=== Dexter: Early Cuts ===
Dexter: Early Cuts is an animated web series that premiered on October 25, 2009. Hall reprises his role as the voice of Dexter.

KTV Media International Bullseye Art produced and animated the webisodes, working closely with Showtime for sound editing, Interspectacular for direction, and illustrators Kyle Baker, Ty Templeton, Andrés Vera Martínez, and Devin Lawson for creating distinctive illustrations. The webisodes are animated in "2.5D style", where flat, two-dimensional illustrations are brought to life in three-dimensional space. The first season was created and written by Dexter producer/writer Lauren Gussis. She was nominated for a Webby for her writing in the first season.

The first web series precedes the narrative of the show and revolves around Dexter hunting down the three victims that he mentions in the sixth episode of season one, "Return to Sender". Each victim's story is split into four, two-minute chapters.

A second season of the web series titled Dexter: Early Cuts: Dark Echo, one story in six chapters, premiered on October 25, 2010. It was written by Tim Schlattmann and illustrated by Bill Sienkiewicz and David Mack. The story begins immediately following Dexter's adoptive father Harry's death.

Season three centers around Dexter's first encounter with a pair of killers. Each story is told in several two- to three-minute chapters.

=== Album soundtrack ===
In August 2007, the album soundtrack entitled Dexter: Music from the Showtime Original Series was released featuring music from the television series. The album was produced by Showtime and distributed by Milan Records. The digital download version offers five additional bonus tracks from the show's first two seasons.

=== Comic book ===
Marvel Comics released a Dexter limited series in July 2013. The comic books are written by creator Jeff Lindsay and drawn by Dalihbor Talajic. Another limited series, called Dexter: Down Under, was published in 2014.

=== Home media releases ===
DVD/Blu-ray releases
DVD name	Release date	Ep #	Additional content
The Complete First Season	Region 1: August 21, 2007; Region 2: May 19, 2008; Region 4: February 14, 2008	12	2 Episode Audio Commentaries by the Cast; The Academy of Blood: A Killer Course!; Witnessed in Blood: A True Murder Investigation; N Technology; 2 episodes of Showtime's Brotherhood
The Complete Second Season	Region 1: August 19, 2008; Region 2: March 30, 2009; Region 4: August 21, 2008	12	2 episodes of Showtime's Brotherhood, Season 2; Via E-Bridge Technology; 2 episodes from The Tudors, Season 2 & Californication
The Complete Third Season	Region 1: August 18, 2009; Region 2: August 16, 2010; Region 4: August 20, 2009	12	Cast Interviews with Michael C. Hall, Lauren Velez, C.S Lee, David Zayas, Jennifer Carpenter, Julie Benz; Victims Match; Inside the Writers Room; Bringing Miami to LA; Miami's Finest; Photo Gallery; First two Episodes of United States of Tara, Season 1
The Complete Fourth Season	Region 1: August 17, 2010; Region 2: November 29, 2010; Region 4: November 4, 2010	12	Californication: Season 3: Episodes 1 & 2; Lock 'N Load: Season 1 – Episode 1; The Tudors: Season 4 – Episodes 1 & 2; Via E-Bridge Technology; Cast Interviews with Michael C. Hall, Clyde Phillips, David Zayas, John Lithgow, C.S Lee, Julie Benz, Lauren Velez, Jennifer Carpenter, James Remar
The Complete Fifth Season	Region 1: August 16, 2011; Region 2: September 5, 2011; Region 4: August 18, 2011	12	Californication: Season 4 – Episodes 1 & 2; Interviews with: Michael C. Hall, Jennifer Carpenter, C.S. Lee, Lauren Vélez, Julia Stiles, James Remar, Desmond Harrington, Chip Johannessen, and David Zayas; Reflecting on Season 5: Julia Stiles; The Borgias: Season 1 – Episodes 1 & 2; Episodes: Season 1 – Episodes 1 & 2; Homeland: Trailer
The Complete Sixth Season	Region 1: August 14, 2012; Region 2: June 18, 2012; Region 4: June 20, 2012	12	House of Lies Episodes 1 & 2; Interviews with David Zayas, Michael C. Hall, Jennifer Carpenter, Lauren Vélez, CS Lee, Colin Hanks, and Desmond Harrington.
The Complete Seventh Season	Region 1: May 14, 2013; Region 2: June 3, 2013; Region 4: June 19, 2013	12	Ray Donovan Pilot Episode; The Borgias: Season 2 – Episodes 1 & 2; Biographies
The Complete Eighth and Final Season	Region 1: November 14, 2013; Region 2: December 2, 2013; Region 4: November 27, 2013	12	From Cop To Killer, featurette; Behind the Scenes; With the Creators; Dissecting a Scene; Ray Donovan: Season 1 – Episodes 1 & 2
Blu-ray Name	Release date	Ep #	Additional Content
The Complete First Season	Region A: January 6, 2009; Region B: June 18, 2012	12	2 Episode Audio Commentaries by the Cast; The Academy of Blood: A Killer Course!; Witnessed in Blood: A True Murder Investigation; Podcast; First Episode of Dexter, Season 3 First two Episodes of United States of Tara, Season 1
The Complete Second Season	Region A: May 5, 2009; Region B: June 18, 2012	12	Tools of the Trade; Podcasts; Featurette: "Blood Fountains"; Featurette: "Dark Defender"; One episode of the upcoming Showtime series Nurse Jackie; One episode of the new Showtime series United States of Tara
The Complete Third Season	Region A: August 18, 2009; Region B: June 18, 2012	12	First two Episodes of The Tudors, Season 3; Dexter By Design – Book Experts; Cast Interviews with Michael C. Hall, Lauren Velez, C.S Lee, David Zayas, Jennifer Carpenter, Julie Benz; First two Episodes of United States of Tara, Season 1
The Complete Fourth Season	Region A: August 17, 2010; Region B: November 4, 2010	12	Californication: Season 3 – Episodes 1 & 2; The Tudors: Season 4 – Episodes 1 & 2; 2009 Comic Con Panel (Best Buy Exclusive)
The Complete Fifth Season	Region A: August 16, 2011; Region B: August 18, 2011	12	The Borgias: Season 1 – Episodes 1 & 2; Episodes: Season 1 – Episodes 1 & 2; Interviews with: Michael C. Hall, Jennifer Carpenter, C.S. Lee, Lauren Vélez, Julia Stiles, James Remar, Desmond Harrington, Chip Johannessen, and David Zayas; Reflecting on Season 5: Julia Stiles
The Complete Sixth Season	Region A: August 15, 2012; Region B: June 18, 2012	12	TBA
The Complete Seventh Season	Region A: May 14, 2013; Region B: June 3, 2013	12	TBA
The Complete Eighth and Final Season	Region A: November 12, 2013; Region B: November 27, 2013	12	TBA

=== Games ===
On September 13, 2009, Icarus Studios released a video game based on the events of season one, for the iPhone platform, via the iTunes app store. The game was released for the iPad on October 15, 2010, and for PCs on February 15, 2011. The cast and crew of Dexter were very supportive, with some of the cast providing full voice work for the game, including Hall. The game has received many positive reviews, including an 8/10 from IGN. No additional content for the game has been released or announced as planned; plans to release the game on the PlayStation 3 and Xbox 360 seem to have been canceled, as no recent information regarding the expansion of the game onto these platforms has been given and both consoles have been discontinued.

In July 2010, Showtime launched Dexter Game On during Comic-Con. The promotion relied on community involvement, part of which required participants to use the SCVNGR applications available for the Android, iPad, iPhone, and iPod Touch platforms to complete treks around the five cities where the game was available. The final trek led to a kill room, where the Infinity Killer had recently claimed a victim. A link was found in the room to a (fake) company called Sleep Superbly, which began an extensive Showtime-maintained alternate reality game that continued until Dexter's season-five premiere. The alternate reality game involves players working cooperatively to help catch the Infinity Killer and identify his victims; several other characters help. During the game, players communicate with the Infinity Killer, among many others. The game spans Craigslist, Facebook, Twitter, and countless unique sites created for the game. Players can even call phone numbers. The characters and companies are controlled by real people, adding an extra layer of realism and the ability for intelligent conversation. To maintain a realistic feeling in the game, Showtime does not put its name or advertisements on most sites or pages created for the game.

In September 2010, the Toronto-based company, GDC-GameDevCo Ltd., released a Dexter board game.

On August 13, 2015, the hidden object mobile game Dexter: Hidden Darkness was released for all iOS devices, with the announcement that Android support would be available soon. Players, acting as Dexter Morgan, solve crimes and hunt down killers to "feed" the dark passenger.

=== Merchandise ===
In February 2010, EMCE Toys announced plans to release action figures based on the series.

In March 2010, Dark Horse Comics released a seven-inch bust of Dexter Morgan, as part of its Last Toys on the Left series. In April 2010, it released a bobblehead doll based on the show character, the Trinity Killer.

A variety of merchandise items is available from Showtime, including an apron, bin bags, blood slide beverage coasters and key rings, drinking glasses, mugs, pens made to look like syringes of blood, posters, and T-shirts.

In June 2021, Flashback announced a highly detailed 1/6th scale figure of Dexter Morgan.

=== Prop sales ===
In January 2014, in partnership with Hollywood Props, Dexter Corner created an auction site and sold hundreds of original props used in the series; part of the auction's proceeds were donated to the Leukemia & Lymphoma Society. Showtime has also offered a limited selection of props for sale.

== Franchise ==
Series	Seasons	Episodes	Originally released			Status
Series	Seasons	Episodes	First released	Last released	Network	Status
Dexter	8	96	October 1, 2006	September 22, 2013	Showtime	Concluded
Dexter: New Blood	1	10	November 7, 2021	January 9, 2022	Showtime	Concluded
Dexter: Original Sin	1	10	December 13, 2024	February 14, 2025	Paramount+ with Showtime	Concluded
Dexter: Resurrection	2	14	July 11, 2025	present	Paramount+ Premium	Airing

By February 2023, additional spin-off series, depicting the origins of various other characters from the original show including the Trinity Killer, were also in development. The new Dexter franchise is being overseen by Clyde Phillips, the showrunner of Dexter. The multiple television shows will be developed through Showtime's merger with Paramount+. By September 2025, Phillips stated that the Trinity Killer series was unlikely to go ahead.

=== Dexter: New Blood (2021–22) ===
On October 14, 2020, Showtime announced that Dexter would return with a 10-episode limited series, starring Michael C. Hall in his original role, with Clyde Phillips returning as showrunner. On November 17, 2020, Marcos Siega was announced as set to direct six episodes of the limited series, as well as executive produce alongside Hall, John Goldwyn, Sara Colleton, Bill Carraro, and Scott Reynolds. Production began in February 2021, with a fall 2021 premiere date. In January 2021, Clancy Brown was cast as Kurt Caldwell, Dexter's main antagonist and David Magidoff was cast as Teddy Reed. In February 2021, Jamie Chung and Oscar Wahlberg were cast in recurring roles. In June 2021, it was announced that John Lithgow would reprise his role as Arthur Mitchell. In July 2021, it was revealed that Jennifer Carpenter would return as well, with both Lithgow and Carpenter appearing in their characters during flashback scenes. It premiered on November 7, 2021, on Showtime.

=== Dexter: Original Sin (2024–25) ===
A prequel series titled Dexter: Original Sin was also developed with a straight-to-series order. It is set 15 years before the events of the original show, in 1991. Depicting the earlier years of Dexter's life through the frame story of Dexter thinking back on his youth after New Blood, the show follows his years after college graduation, and his first introduction to various characters from the original series. Members of his family feature as main characters.

The series stars Patrick Gibson as Dexter, Molly Brown as Debra, and Christian Slater as Harry Morgan. Other cast includes Patrick Dempsey as Aaron Spencer, James Martinez as Angel Batista, Christina Milian as Maria LaGuerta, Alex Shimizu as Vince Masuka, Reno Wilson as Bobby Watt and Sarah Michelle Gellar as Tanya Martin. The series premiered on December 13, 2024, on Showtime. The first season consisted of 10 episodes, released weekly and ending on February 14, 2025. A second season was announced on April 1, 2025. On August 22, 2025, Dexter: Original Sin was canceled, reversing the renewal.

=== Dexter: Resurrection (2025–present) ===
A sequel series to Dexter: New Blood titled Dexter: Resurrection was announced, with Michael C. Hall reprising his role as Dexter, at San Diego Comic-Con on July 26, 2024. In January 2025, David Zayas, James Remar, and Jack Alcott were confirmed as series regulars, reprising their roles as Detective Angel Batista, Harry Morgan, and Harrison Morgan, respectively. Other cast confirmed for the series included Uma Thurman, Peter Dinklage, Neil Patrick Harris, Krysten Ritter, Eric Stonestreet, Ntare Guma Mbaho Mwine, Dominic Fumusa, Kadia Saraf, Emilia Suárez, David Dastmalchian, and Steve Schirripa. John Lithgow reprised his role as the Trinity Killer in a cameo. "They're rebooting the entire Michael C. Hall version of 'Dexter.' And it turns out he didn't die after all. I come back sort of as a phantom, as he gradually comes to life on a hospital bed," Lithgow said. Christian Camargo, Erik King, and Jimmy Smits also reprised their roles as Brian, Doakes, and Miguel, respectively.

The series premiered on Paramount+ Premium on July 11, 2025. On October 8, 2025, Showtime renewed the series for a second season.
