= Hollywood Houselift with Jeff Lewis =

- Genre: Reality
- Starring: Jeff Lewis
- Country of origin: United States
- Original language: English
- No. of seasons: 2
- No. of episodes: 20

Production
- Executive producers: Allison Grodner; Jeff Lewis; Rich Meehan; Billy Taylor
- Cinematography: Ben Chaves
- Production company: Fly on the Wall Entertainment

Original release
- Network: Amazon Freevee
- Release: June 10, 2022 – January 30, 2024

Hollywood Houselift with Jeff Lewis is an American reality television series hosted by Jeff Lewis. It premiered on Amazon Freevee on June 10, 2022. Season 2 premiered with two episodes on December 5, 2023, on Amazon Freevee.

== Summary ==
The series follows interior designer Jeff Lewis and his assistant Shane Douglas as they work on home remodeling projects for Hollywood celebrities.

The show is executive produced by Lewis, Allison Grodner and Rich Meehan, with Billy Taylor as the showrunner. It is Lewis's first TV series since Flipping Out, which ran on Bravo from 2007 to 2018.

== Cast ==
- Jeff Lewis
- Shane Douglas
- Tyler Meyerkorth
- Anthony Anderson
- Wilmer Valderrama
- Fortune Feimster
- Melissa Rivers
- Evan Ross
- Ashlee Simpson
- Mira Sorvino
- Lamorne Morris
- Roselyn Sanchez

== Episodes ==
No.	Title	Original release date
Season 1
S1E1	"Dreams and Dollar Signs"	10 June 2022
Lewis helps Fortune Feimster update her home's interior, Wilmer Valderrama wants a family-friendly living space, and Lewis finds a dream home that may cause problems with his family.
S1E2	"Hedge Your Bets"	10 June 2022
Lewis meets with Lamorne Morris about renovating his pool house transformation and is surprised that there is already another designer on the project. Feimster's project breaks ground, and Lewis moves ahead with plans for his dream house.
S1E3	"What I Hear Is No Budget"	10 June 2022
Lewis continues working on Morris's pool house, but is not on the same page as the other designer. Anthony Anderson hires Lewis for a yard renovation, and Valderrama has trouble with design choices.
S1E4	"A Facelift and a Little Lipo"	17 June 2022
Actress and television host Melissa Rivers enlists Jeff to transform her bathroom into a luxury space, but she also wants to stay on a strict budget, which may not be possible given her expensive taste. Meanwhile, Fortune's exterior renovation comes to a close, as demolition begins on Anthony’s front yard. However, Anthony's project comes to a quick halt when landscapers damage a sprinkler line.
S1E5	"Make It Aspen-y"	24 June 2022
Jeff must manage Melissa’s expectations for her luxurious dream bathroom while on a limited budget, while ensuring the hardscape phase on Anthony's project continues without further delays. Later, Jeff meets with couple Ashlee Simpson Ross and Evan Ross, both musicians and actors, to renovate their primary bedroom, challenging Jeff to come up with a design in line with their eclectic tastes.
S1E6	"We'll Always Have Capri"	1 July 2022
Jeff and Wilmer’s visions for a family friendly space align until personal pregnancy photos emerge as an option for dining room art. Ashlee and Evan get restless when delays derail the order of their bedroom furniture. Meanwhile, Jeff meets with actress Mira Sorvino and her husband, actor Christopher Backus, to restore their outdoor oasis in Malibu damaged by the Woolsey Fires.
S1E7	"Soften the Hardscape"	8 July 2022
Anthony worries his front yard has too much hardscape and not enough greenery, so Jeff must come up with a plan to better balance the two. As demolition begins on Mira’s backyard, concerns about old plumbing jeopardize other repairs, and new client, actress Roselyn Sanchez, enlists Jeff’s help to update her office into a multifunctional work-from-home/podcast space under a tight deadline.
S1E8	"If the Couch Fits..."	15 July 2022
When a delivery snafu at Anthony’s leads to the wrong tile being installed, Jeff may have to repair more than just the water feature. With most of Ashlee and Evan’s budget allocated to one-of-a-kind wallpaper, the team must get creative to complete their primary bedroom. Fortune Feimster returns for help with some interior upgrades.
S1E9	"Family Hot Tub"	22 July 2022
Jeff and his team rush to put the finishing touches on Roselyn’s podcast space. Meanwhile, Mira’s project is threatened when some unexpected visitors hang in the pool. Big changes are on the horizon for Jeff.
S1E10	"The End is the Beginning"	29 July 2022
Jeff and his team scramble to complete Anthony’s front yard landscaping after the expensive olive trees arrive damaged. At the same time, Jeff prepares to move out of his Hollywood Hills home and move forward with an embryo transfer.
Season 2
S2E1	"Dazzle Me, Jeff"	5 December 2023
Actor Josh Duhamel and his new wife, Audra, enlist Jeff’s help in transforming his bachelor pad into a sophisticated space they can both enjoy; meanwhile, new mom and actress Gina Rodriguez and her husband, Joe, hope to restore the romance on their primary suite balcony. Later, Jeff visits the construction of his new dream home and Anthony Anderson is back to finally complete his backyard oasis.
S2E2	"Back in the Closet"	5 December 2023
Jeff takes on new client, fashion designer Sara Foster, to rethink the layout of her primary bedroom and closet, but quickly realizes that the problem is much bigger than he ever imagined; later, Josh Duhamel’s project makes a pivot and Gina Rodriguez and her husband, Joe encounter unexpected guests nearing the finish line of their backyard transformation.
S2E3	"Tiffany Blues"	12 December 2023
All-star NFL running back Reggie Bush invites Jeff over to his 9,000 square foot compound to re-envision a small bedroom that his three children share. Meanwhile, Josh Duhamel’s top-of-the-line wish list for his primary suite increases the budget further than expected, and Sara Foster has a surprising reaction to Jeff and Tyler’s unique design plan for her new dressing room closet.
S2E4	"Every Day is Christmas"	19 December 2023
Emmy-nominated actress Christina Ricci is looking to sell her traditional family home, but first needs Jeff’s expertise to add resale value to the kitchen and primary bathroom. Meanwhile, Reggie Bush’s kids get involved in the action of their new bedroom, while Josh Duhamel’s project presents a thousand-pound headache.
S2E5	"Excess Baggage"	26 December 2023
Real Housewives of Atlanta star Cynthia Bailey needs help getting comfortable in her daughter’s home, but Jeff must get to the heart of much deeper issues to make this mother-daughter remodel a success. Later, things get a little hot designing Christina Ricci’s kitchen and primary bathroom. Anthony Anderson’s outdoor kitchen progress comes to a halt when permit delays throw a wrench in the plans.
S2E6	"Beck and Call"	2 January 2024
Jeff brings in two new clients. First, social media star Noah Beck needs help creating an upscale living space in his new West Hollywood townhouse. Then, actress Regina Hall seeks the team to fix the awkward layout of her rental property. As Jeff moves at lightning speed to remedy Anthony’s backyard mishap, a hiccup in Christina Ricci’s project management calls the team’s loyalty into question.
S2E7	"Who’s The Boss"	9 January 2024
Actress Kate Bosworth needs Jeff’s help to complete her idyllic backyard with an inspired mid-century modern outdoor pavilion. Meanwhile, Regina Hall’s rental property gets a new layout complete with a beautiful, bold facelift in two unique spaces. Jeff buries the hatchet after a fallout with his team to get Christina Ricci’s project back on track.
S2E8	"Million Dollar Backyard"	16 January 2024
Christina Ricci’s project kicks into high gear for her kitchen and primary bathroom, but Jeff realizes that the renovation will only go so far without cleaning up the exteriors to maximize curb appeal. Meanwhile, Jeff and team encounter unexpected territory as they break ground on Kate Bosworth’s outdoor pool house and the completion of Anthony Anderson’s backyard oasis enters the final stretch.
S2E9	"Gus What Happens?"	23 January 2024
When hands-on Kate Bosworth leaves town in the middle of her renovation, Jeff goes the distance to keep the project moving and her mind at ease. Meanwhile, Jeff pivots the original approach of Christina’s kitchen and primary bath for a bolder, high-end design to raise the value of the house. Later, Jeff hires a new house manager, Gus, in an attempt to fill Nancy’s shoes.
S2E10	"The Finish Line"	30 January 2024
When Jeff gets closer to completing Christina Ricci’s kitchen and primary bath, a home inspection reveals further repairs and cosmetic work are needed to get top dollar on her investment. Later, Jeff hosts a bittersweet celebration with his team despite some unfortunate news. With his projects finally wrapping, Jeff puts his full attention back on the extensive remodel of his forever family home.

== Release ==
The trailer for the series was released on May 2, 2022. The first three episodes of the series premiered on Amazon Freevee on June 10, 2022, with a new episode made available every Friday through July 29, 2022.

On December 7, 2022, it was announced that Amazon Studios had renewed the series for a second season. The first two episodes of the second season premiered on Freevee on December 6, 2023, with a new episode each week through January 31, 2024. Season 2 includes appearances from celebrity clients including Anthony Anderson, Kate Bosworth, Reggie Bush, Josh Duhamel, Regina Hall, Christina Ricci, and Gina Rodriguez.

== Reception ==
Nina Metz of the Chicago Tribune rated the series 3 out of 4 stars and called it "fascinating," writing, "No matter the personal style - austere, expensive minimalism or over-the-top everything - all of it is ostentatious and fascinating and says so much about how the 1% spend their wealth. This is the primary appeal of 'Hollywood Houselift with Jeff Lewis.'" Rachel Shatto of The Advocate called the series "a welcome return to form" for Lewis, adding that it "functions more like a sequel to Bravo's Flipping Out than a reboot."
