= Property Envy =

- Genre: Real estate
- Presented by: Stephen Collins
- Starring: Jeff Lewis; Brandie Malay; Mary McDonald
- Country of origin: United States
- Original language: English
- No. of seasons: 1
- No. of episodes: 12

Production
- Executive producers: Fenton Bailey; Randy Barbato; Robert Lifton; Tom Campbell
- Running time: 20 to 22 minutes
- Production company: World of Wonder Productions

Original release
- Network: Bravo
- Release: July 9 – September 10, 2013

Property Envy is an American talk show series that debuted on July 9, 2013, on Bravo after the second season premiere of Interior Therapy with Jeff Lewis.

== Format ==
Stephen Collins will present some of the most exclusive and expensive houses in the country to the Jeff Lewis, Brandie Malay and Mary McDonald while they try to guess the listing price of the following house. Fredrik Eklund and Ryan Serhant are expected to be featured as guest panelists.

== Episodes ==
No.	Title	Original release date	U.S. viewers (millions)
1	"Design Marvels"	July 9, 2013	0.73
2	"Holy Houses"	July 9, 2013	0.67
3	"Back to Nature"	July 16, 2013	0.59
4	"Best of Both Coasts"	July 16, 2013	0.46
5	"Rock, Trees and Big Game Hunting"	July 23, 2013	0.58
6	"Sin City"	July 30, 2013	N/A
7	"From Connecticut to California"	August 6, 2013	N/A
8	"Rooms With a View"	August 13, 2013	N/A
9	"Ridiculous Ranches"	August 20, 2013	N/A
10	"The Hamptons"	August 27, 2013	N/A
11	"Big in Texas"	September 3, 2013	N/A
12	"Architectural Wonders"	September 10, 2013	N/A
