= Don Wildman =

American TV host and narrator

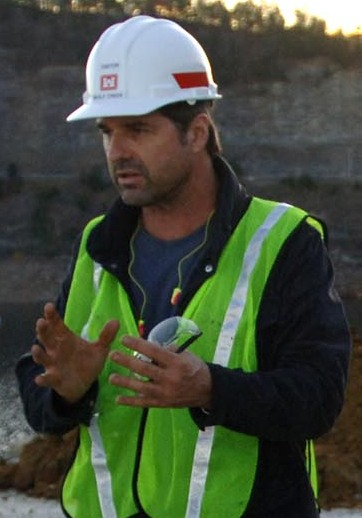
- Don Wildman at Wolf Creek Dam in 2011 for Travel Channel
- Born: March 21, 1961 (age 65); Philadelphia, Pennsylvania, U.S.
- Education: Earlham College; Drama Studio London
- Occupations: Actor, television host, narrator, historical investigator
- Years active: 1969–present
- Spouse: Melissa Haizlip

Don Wildman (born March 21, 1961) is a podcast and documentary host. He is the current host of the American History Hit podcast as well as the host and narrator of Mysteries at the Museum, Beyond the Unknown, Dark Tales with Don Wildman, and Buried Worlds with Don Wildman on the Travel Channel.

He also hosted and narrated Travel Channel's Weird Travels, Off Limits, and Monumental Mysteries.

== Early life ==
Wildman was raised in Pitman, New Jersey, and is a 1979 graduate of Westtown School, a Quaker boarding school located in Chester County, Pennsylvania. He also attended Earlham College in Richmond, Indiana (another Quaker school) and trained as an actor at Drama Studio London.

== Acting ==
Wildman was originally a stage actor in several production the best known of which was Gross Indecency: The Three Trials of Oscar Wilde. He also acted in several commercials before finding success with his love of history and mysteries.

== Travel Channel ==
Wildman began working for the Travel Channel in 2003 with Weird Travels, a documentary TV series made in the United States about international paranormal destinations. The show aired from 2001 to 2006, but Wildman was only involved from 2003 to 2005.

He continued his work with Travel Channel in 2007 with two programs: The Incurables and Cities of the Underworld, which ended in 2008 and 2009, respectively.

In 2011, Wildman hosted Pompeii: Back from the Dead and has been working at the channel ever since.

His most successful TV series to date was Mysteries at the Museum, which ran from 2011 to 2020. He is currently, as of late 2023, hosting Mysteries of the Unknown, which airs new episodes (as of December 2023) every Monday night at 8 p.m., on the Travel Channel.

== Producer ==
In addition to acting, hosting and narrating, Wildman produced Off Limits from 2011 to 2013 for the Travel Channel, a documentary series about historical sites around the United States which are unknown and/or off limits. He also hosted the show. He has not produced anything else to date.

== Podcast host ==
Since 2022, Wildman has been the host of the twice-weekly podcast American History Hit. He interviews experts and authors on such topics as the Battle of Midway, Presidential assassinations, the Oregon Trail, and Ellis Island. The podcast is associated with the British video streaming service and podcast channel History Hit.

== Filmography ==
Year	Title	Role	Notes
1997	Men's Journal	Himself/host	TV series
2003	Primetime Glick	Sam Hoibins	(2001 TV series) Episode: "Chris Elliot"
2003	Weird Travels	Himself/host	TV series
2003–2004	Passions	Crane / seventies flashback	(1999 TV series) 2 episodes
2006	New York Waiting	Michael	Film
2007–2008	The Incurables	Host	TV series
2008–2009	Cities of the Underworld	Himself/host	TV series
2011	Pompei: Back from the Dead	Himself/host	TV movie/documentary
2011–2013	Off Limits	Himself/host	TV series
2011–present	Mysteries at the Museum	Himself/host	TV series
2012	World's Best Bartender	Himself/host	TV special
2013	Sidewalk's Entertainment	Guest	TV series
2013–2015	Monumental Mysteries	Himself/host	TV series
2014	The Trip: 2014	Himself/host	TV special
2014	KCAL 9 News Weekend Report	Guest	TV series
2013–2014	Greatest Mysteries	Himself/host	TV series documentary
2015	The Trip: 2015	Himself/host	TV special
2015	Metropolis	Himself/host	TV mini-series documentary
2013–2015	Mysteries at the Monument	Himself/host	TV series
2019–present	Beyond the Unknown	Himself/host	TV series
2020	Josh Gates Tonight	Himself/Guest	TV series
2020	Buried Worlds with Don Wildman	Himself/host	TV series
2020–present	Mysteries of the Unknown (2-hour special episodes of Mysteries at the Museum)	Himself/host	TV series
2025	Secrets Declassified with David Duchovny	Himself	8 episodes

Don Wildman hosts Travel Channel's Mysteries at the Museum. According to an article published by Travel Channel, "Don Wildman is fast becoming one [of] the most recognizable faces in documentary television."
