= Authentic Entertainment =

American television production company

Authentic Entertainment, LLC
- Type: Subsidiary
- Industry: Television production
- Founded: 2000; 26 years ago
- Founder: Lauren Lexton; Tom Rogan
- Defunct: January 31, 2025; 20 months ago
- Fate: Folded into 51 Minds Entertainment
- Successor: 51 Minds Entertainment
- Products: Television programs
- Parent: Endemol USA (2010–2015); Endemol Shine North America (2015–2025)
- Website: www.authentictv.com

Authentic Entertainment, LLC was a Burbank-based reality television company founded in 2000 by Lauren Lexton and Tom Rogan that has produced television series that cover a wide range of subjects (e.g. Ace of Cakes, Weird Travels, Toddlers & Tiaras, All on the Line, Surprise Homecoming, Flipping Out, The Best Thing I Ever Ate, Auction Kings, Off Limits, Here Comes Honey Boo Boo), and most recently Cheer Perfection and Is Your Dog A Genius? and air on multiple networks, including Bravo, the Food Network, TLC, and the Discovery Channel. Authentic produces about 200 hours of programming a year. Endemol (now Banijay Entertainment) had been the owner of Authentic Entertainment from 2010 to 2025. The name ceased in 2025.

== History ==
Authentic Entertainment was founded in 2000 by Lauren Lexton and Tom Rogan, who were familiar with each other in their work as freelance reality production staffers.

On August 10, 2010, Endemol B.V. announced the acquisition of a majority share of Authentic Entertainment Inc. by Endemol North America, with unverified reports claiming the deal worth US$60–70 million.

On January 31, 2025, Authentic Entertainment was folded into 51 Minds Entertainment.

== Marketing ==
Authentic was represented by the Creative Artists Agency.

== Awards ==
Authentic had been named to Realscreen magazine's "Global 100" list for six consecutive years, starting in 2007, and continuing in 2008, 2009, 2010, 2011, and 2012.

Four of their shows have received CINE Golden Eagle awards: Flipping Out in 2008, and Ace of Cakes, Toddlers & Tiaras, and The Best Thing I Ever Ate in 2010. In 2013, The Best Thing I Ever Made won a Daytime Emmy Award, and in 2014, Flipping Out was nominated for a Primetime Emmy Award.

== Productions ==
Sources:

- Weird Travels
- Weddings Away
- Weddings Altered
- Travel Channel Secrets
- The Running of the Brides
- The Other Nostradamus
- The 750 Pound Man
- Scene of the Crime
- Reasonable Doubt
- My Husband's Three Wives
- Losing It: Tales From Fat Camp
- Incredibly Small
- Help I'm A Hoarder
- Haunted Hotels
- Ghost Moms
- Destination USA
- Clinically Wild Alaska
- Christmas: Behind The Tradition
- Christmas Specials (Crazy for Christmas, Dazzling Holiday Lights, Christmas Fun in the Sun)
- Beyond The Bull
- Beach Eats
- Will Work For Food
- The Sun
- Pop School
- Night (TV series)
- Lock 'N Load
- g word
- Cities of the Underworld
- Mysterious Journeys
- Science Of The Movies
- The Unpoppables
- Traveler's Guide to Life
- Best Places I've Ever Been: Disney Memories
- Track Me If You Can
- You're Wearing That?!?
- Surprise Homecoming with Billy Ray Cyrus
- Amsale Girls
- The Originals with Emeril
- Howe and Howe Tech
- High Stakes Sweepers
- 10 Things that Make Me Happy
- Out of Character with Krista Smith
- Sugar High
- Ludo Bites America
- All About The Food
- Raising Fame
- Family Beef
- LA Sugar
- Big Mama's Kitchen
- Bidding War
- The Next Game Boss
- Geek Love
- Living Country
- How Human Are You?
- Interior Therapy with Jeff Lewis
- Off Limits
- The Best Thing I Ever Made
- Flipping the Block
- Jersey Belle
- You Can't Lick Your Elbow
- My First home
- Is Your Dog A Genius?
- Cheer Perfection
- White Collar Brawlers
- Auction Kings
- It Takes a Church
- All on the Line with Joe Zee
- Duff Till Dawn
- Waterfront House Hunting
- Guilty Pleasures
- Top 5 Restaurants
- Ace of Cakes
- Toddlers & Tiaras
- The Best Thing I Ever Ate
- Flipping Out
- Knife Fight
- Vacation Home Search
- Christmas Show
- The Poor Bastard
- Food Firsts
- His & Hers
- Paradise Found
- Married Like a Movie Star
- Growing Up Hollywood
- Venom Hunters
- Trip Testers
- Star Plates
- Smartest Guy In The Room
- Cake Masters
- Here Comes Honey Boo Boo
- The Perfect Fit
- Breaking Bass
- Trading Spaces
- Listing Impossible
