= Somekh =

Somekh (Hebrew: סומך; Arabic: سوميخ) is a surname. Notable people with the surname include:

- Abdallah Somekh (1813–1889), Iraqi Jewish hakham, rosh yeshiva and posek
- Addi Somekh (born 1972), American self-taught balloon artist
- Sasson Somekh (1933–2019), Iraqi-Israeli academic, writer and translator
