= Buried Worlds with Don Wildman =

American reality television series

- Genre: Documentary; Reality TV; Adventure; History; Mystery; Paranormal; Travel
- Starring: Don Wildman
- Country of origin: United States
- Original language: English
- No. of seasons: 1

Production
- Executive producers: Chris Bray; Kelly McPherson; Emre Sahin; Sarah Wetherbee
- Camera setup: Multi-camera setup
- Running time: 60 minutes

Original release
- Network: Travel Channel
- Release: Invalid date range

Buried Worlds with Don Wildman (or Buried Worlds for short) is a documentary reality television series that follows TV host and adventurer Don Wildman on his quest to find the mysteries of long-lost worlds.

The first season of eight episodes premiered on Travel Channel on Monday June 8, 2020 at 9/8c.

== Premise ==
Host/adventurer Don Wildman journeys to the most remote areas and forgotten places to explore the world's darkest mysteries and uncover its secrets to the public. He heads to terrifying territories of the supernatural, paranormal, and even learns about cryptic-logical locations where ghosts, vampires, demons, and witches are known to occupy these lands.

Opening Introduction:

"My name is Don Wildman. I spent my life exploring the world's most dangerous and unusual places, pursuing its greatest hidden mysteries. This is my darkest quest yet, diving into the secrets of 'Buried Worlds'."

== Episodes ==
No.	Title	Original release date	US viewers (millions)
1	"Temples of Doom"	June 8, 2020	N/A
In the series premiere, adventurer Don Wildman enters the dark world of ancient Peru before the Incas. He investigates the Chavín cult and undergoes their most-terrifying imitation by navigating through pitch-dark tunnels beneath their temple, Chavin de Huantar, believed to be a portal to the unknown. In La Jalaca, Don finds evidence of a supernatural war between the Chachapoya and the dead in remote caves. In Chan Chan, he uncovers skeletons from a human sacrifice of the Chimú tribe so they could harness the powers of the gods.
2	"Voodoo's Dark Magic"	June 15, 2020	N/A
Don goes on a quest to understand the dark mysteries of voodoo. He travels to Haiti and gains access to a blood offering performed in the ancient cave of Dondon and learns of magical potions to heal or kill. In New Orleans, he witnesses a secret ritual in which a voodoo priest is possessed by Baron Samedi, the Haitian Lord of Death. But when uncovering the truth about zombification, he realizes that some things in this reglion are too taboo.
3	"The Nazi's Supernatural Weapons"	June 22, 2020	N/A
Don learns the Nazis tried to obtain world domination by harnessing the supernatural. In Opole, Poland, he gains access to a diary that belonged to an SS officer, which reveals the hidden locations of eleven stolen ancient artifacts. Clues within it leads him to the Riese Complex, a tunnel system beneath Adolf Hitler's castle in the Owl Mountains where religious relics were stored. He travels to a monastery, home of the Black Madonna that monks hid from Nazis, and a medieval church in Quedlinburg, Germany where Heinrich Himmler tried to summon the spirit of Heinrich the Fowler. Lastly, he visits a cave in the Harz Mountains where Nazis sought out Germanic witches to perform black magic rituals.
4	"Curse of the Druids"	June 29, 2020	N/A
Don journeys to the haunted British Isles where he visits the Creswell Crags, a limestone cave system believed to be a gateway to Hell. While there, he inspects the alleged "witch's marks", medieval symbols said to ward off evil spirits. In Portrane, Ireland, he hikes to ancient natural-springs called "holy wells" that was used for spells. He dives into the Irish Sea to explore the supernatural shipwreck of the RMS Tayleur, which was possibly the cause of mysterious tragedies at sea. Lastly, Don meets modern-day Druids at Bryn Celli Ddu in Anglesey, Wales to learn of a bloody battle that ended with a deadly curse when their people were wiped out by the Romans thousands of years ago.
5	"Vampire Hunt"	July 6, 2020	N/A
Don travels to Bulgaria, the birthplace of vampires to investigate vampiric activity that dates back to the 6th Century. He goes to the long-abandoned Asen's Fortress where 20 vampire tombs were found years ago. He joins a team of vampire hunters called the 'sabotnici' who has evidence of demonic vampire spirits that's reportedly terrorizing a local village. He helps them perform a 'singing candle ceremony' to clear the houses of dark energy. He explores a portal to Hell in the dangerous river cave 'Devil's Throat' deep in the Southern Bulgarian Rhodope Mountains. Next, Don heads 500 miles north to Hungary to visit Buda Castle's subterranean prison beneath the streets of Budapest that once held the world's most infamous vampire, Vlad the Impaler, better known as "Dracula". Also, he learns that a Hungarian forest, 'Isle of Witches', is home to witches by day and vampires at night.
6	"Devil Swamp"	July 13, 2020	N/A
Don investigates reports of bizarre cult activity and strange sightings in the bayous of Louisiana. He seeks out ghostly orbs in the Lagtown Cemetery in Logtown, Mississippi, once home to the largest saw mill where workers died from accidents on the job. He tracks down a follet, or blue fairy said to guard a pirate's long-lost buried treasure somewhere in Jean Lafitte National Park. Next, he is introduced to real-life vampires who explain misconceptions about their kind as they feed off energies from the swamp. He then meets a Luciferian witch who performs blood rituals in order to speak with demons. Lastly, he hunts a demonic beast called a Grunch, a dog and reptile-like demonic creature in the wetlands near New Orleans. Don deduces the water that soaks the bayou's ground somehow holds the memory of the swamp's terrifying past, and all that evil seems to draw people to it.
7	"Demon Woods"	July 20, 2020	N/A
Don travels to the Old House Woods in Mathews County, Virginia where he follows up on claims of supernatural sightings and demon possessions. This small forest may be linked to the lost Roanoke Colony on Roanoke Island, North Carolina where 500 years ago, British colonists left England in search of a New World. After research, he theorizes that the colonists may have brought Encochian magic with them. Soon after arriving, they're forced to flee north where they are attacked and killed by Chief Powhatan and his tribe, possibly for practicing dark rituals. Before they are slaughtered, the colonists cast a powerful spell to fend off the tribe's attack. This spell may have opened a portal, called the "Cow Hole", causing a demon or evil entity to be released on Earth. It laid dormant for decades until it possessed a local and through him, uttered the Enochian Keys, causing the portal to open with the colonists' ghosts.
8	"Curse of the White City"	July 27, 2020	N/A
Don takes on the most dangerous quest of his career. He investigates a legend that goes back 500 years, the curse of La Ciudad Blanca ("White City"). An ancient lost city in the middle of a rainforest full of gold, treasure and advanced technology that suddenly disappears, swallowed up by the jungles of the Mosquitia region in Honduras at the Río Plátano Biosphere Reserve. It is claimed to be doomed by a mysterious and powerful curse that still haunts the land to this day. He learns the local Pech people met an alien named Wata who came from the stars to help the oldest tribe build the city, but once built, he had to escape from his enemy, The Ra and left a curse.
