= Katie Balloons =

American balloon artist

- Born: Katie Laibstain; September 18, 1984 (age 41); Newport News, Virginia, United States
- Years active: 2006–present
- Website: katieballoons.com/

Katie Balloons (born September 9, 1984) is a New York City and Pocono Mountains–based balloon artist and entertainer best known for appearing in TV series The Unpoppables.

== Early life ==
Katie received a balloon twisting kit for her seventh birthday and quickly learned how to twist her own balloons, but after running out of balloons she moved on to other pursuits. Katie came back to balloons in 2007 as a way to supplement her fledgling acting career and remain in the arts. After attending the Twist and Shout balloon convention in Nashville, Tennessee and being inspired by the giant balloon sculptures created by others, she took it upon herself to conquer it and make a career out of it. This lead her to a position in a festival in Shanghai where she was able to cultivate her skills and work with other balloon artists from around the world, as well as a role in the TLC reality television show The Unpoppables.

== Unpoppables ==
Katie, along with Addi Somekh and Brian Ashman, are the stars of TLC reality TV show The Unpoppables. The trio, which together comprise the balloon collective known as New Balloon Art, were given three days to design and build various balloon creations for installations at events that ranged from an aforementioned wedding, to a celebration at a fire museum.

== Current career ==
Currently Katie runs her own balloon business creating balloon environments, balloon sculptures, as well as doing balloon centered performances for various events ranging from birthday parties to charitable fundraiser. Katie's work includes a hockey player done for a cancer benefit, the balloon environment for the 2012 Brightest Young Things Halloween extravaganza at the Dream Downtown hotel in Chelsea, as well as work for multiple corporate clients and even the White House.
