= The Unpoppables =

- Genre: Reality
- Starring: Addi Somekh, Brian Asman and Katie Balloons
- Country of origin: United States
- Original language: English
- No. of seasons: 1
- No. of episodes: 6

Production
- Production location: Los Angeles, California
- Running time: 30 minutes
- Production company: Authentic Entertainment

Original release
- Network: TLC
- Release: February 7, 2011 – present

Unpoppables is a television show on TLC, featuring three balloon artists that aired for six episodes in early 2011. The show portrays their work for the company New Balloon Art, based in Los Angeles, California. Season one premiered on February 7, 2011.

== Format ==
The production company for Unpoppables is Authentic Entertainment, producers of Ace of Cakes. Like Ace of Cakes, the show follows a group of highly skilled artisans in their respective fields as they are challenged to complete seemingly impossible tasks at the last moment. In the show, the cast is given three days to design and build their elaborate balloon creations. This is common in the balloon world as balloon sculptures can not be made more than 72 hours in advance of an event or they risk deflation, color fading and popping.

== Cast ==
The cast consist of three characters. Addi Somekh taught himself balloon art all on his own. His success has led him to appear on The Martha Stewart Show, The Today Show, The Tonight Show with Jay Leno, Access Hollywood, and several other shows. He owns and manages his own company - New Balloon Art Prior to "The Unpoppable," Addy had achieved notability in the balloon twisting world as he traveled to 34 countries with photographer Charlie Eckert making free hats for photo ops.

Katie Balloons is portrayed as the show's fashion expert; she did not regularly make dresses for other people until the show began.

Brian Asman is a former chef now working full-time for New Balloon Art. He is known for his realistic art and professionalism. Brian is from Brooklyn, New York.

== New Balloon Art ==
New Balloon Art is the name of balloon decorating company, owned by Addi, that the show focuses on. Founded in 2002 as a one-man company, today the company has grown to include clients worldwide. For large projects, Addi brings in extra assistance as needed beyond the team of Katie and Brian. Information about New Balloon Art can be found at their website.
