= Is Your Dog A Genius? =

2015 American documentary TV series

- Genre: Documentary
- Starring: Dr. Brian Hare
- Country of origin: United States
- No. of seasons: 1
- No. of episodes: 3

Production
- Running time: 42 minutes
- Production company: Authentic Entertainment

Original release
- Network: Nat Geo Wild
- Release: May 15 – May 17, 2015

Is Your Dog A Genius is a three-part American interactive documentary television series airing on Nat Geo Wild. The series, hosted by Dr. Brian Hare, uses a series of tests known as 'The Dognition Assessment' to determine what skills a dog possesses to determine how intelligent your dogs are. The series is produced by Authentic Entertainment.

== Broadcast ==
The series premiered in the U.S. on Nat Geo Wild across three nights from May 15 to May 17, 2015. The three part series aired as part of the channel's special 'BarkFest' block of dog-themed programming.

Internationally, the series premiered in Australia on August 5, 2015, on the local version of Nat Geo People.

== Episodes ==
No.	Title	Original release date	U.S. viewers (millions)
1	"Doggy See, Doggy Do"	May 15, 2015	275,000
Duke University dog scientist Dr. Brian Hare uses his groundbreaking research to help dog owners better understand their canine companions. This interactive series will help dog owners everywhere unlock their canine’s true potential.
2	"Who's Your Doggy?"	May 16, 2015	N/A
Duke University dog scientist Dr. Brian Hare has developed a series of scientific tests to reveal your dog’s unique strategies and help you improve your relationship with your pet.
3	"Talk Doggy to Me"	May 17, 2015	N/A
Dogs and humans share a social bond unlike any two species on the planet. But how does your dog really feel about you?
