= Listing Impossible =

American television series

- Country of origin: United States
- Original language: English
- No. of seasons: 1
- No. of episodes: 8

Production
- Executive producers: Jim Ackerman; Luke Bauer; Helga Eike; Sara Reddy; David Tibballs
- Producer: Aaron Kirman
- Production company: Authentic Entertainment

Original release
- Network: CNBC
- Release: January 15, 2020 – 2020

Listing Impossible is a television series that premiered on CNBC in January 2020.

== See also ==
- 2020 in American television
