= Dexter: Music from the Showtime Original Series =

Soundtrack album by Daniel Licht, Various Artists
- Released: August 28, 2007
- Length: 1:04:06
- Label: Milan Records
- Producer: Showtime

Professional ratings
Review scores
| Source | Rating |
|---|---|
| Amazon | 5/5 stars |

Dexter: Music from the Showtime Original Series is a soundtrack album featuring music from the first season of the American television series Dexter. The album was released on August 28, 2007, on CD and download from the iTunes Store. The album was also released to music streaming services, such as Spotify.

== Production and musical content ==
The album contains 25 tracks over 1 hour and 4 minutes. Track 1 is the opening theme by Rolfe Kent. Tracks 2 through 11 are mostly Cuban and Latin music used during the show, with tracks 2, 6 and 9 containing narration by Michael C. Hall. Tracks 12 through 24 were written by Daniel Licht, who composed all of the show's other themes. Bonus track 25 is track 24, "Blood Theme", with Jon Licht singing over. Kent's widely praised opening theme utilises an eclectic selection of European and Asian instruments, including ukulele, piano, bouzouki, trumpets, pizzicato strings, electric piano, saz, and tambour, set to an Afro-Cuban beat. Licht's original themes are based around a mixture of Latin and electronic music, reflecting Dexter's warm and cold elements.

The well-known "Blood Theme", played during the credits on every episode, uses a combination of piano and bassoon and bowed string instruments such as violin, viola and cello. The first measures of the "Blood Theme" were first heard in the soundtrack for the American anthology horror film H.P. Lovecraft's: Necronomicon (in "The Library, part 1" segment), also composed by Daniel Licht, before being later enriched and expanded for use in the TV Show "Dexter". Most composings of the original soundtrack have a similar intention and instrumentation, features a common use of harp, strings, piano and a bright variety of percussion sounds.

== Track listing ==
1. "Dexter Main Title" (Rolfe Kent) – 1:40
2. "Tonight’s the Night" (Michael C. Hall, Daniel Licht) – 1:07
3. "Conoci La Paz" (Beny Moré) – 3:03
4. "Uruapan Breaks" (Kinky) – 2:21
5. "Flores Para Ti" (Raw Artistic Soul featuring Rafael Cortez) – 5:16
6. "Blood" (Michael C. Hall, Daniel Licht) – 0:59
7. "Con Mi Guaguanco" (Ray Armando) – 7:12
8. "Perfidia" (Mambo All-Stars) – 2:37
9. "Sometimes I Wonder" (Michael C. Hall, Daniel Licht) – 0:29
10. "Born Free" (Andy Williams) – 2:25
11. "Dexter Main Title" (Kinky) – 1:41
12. "Escalation" (Daniel Licht) – 2:09
13. "Shipyard" (Daniel Licht) – 2:03
14. "Deborah Loves Rudy/The House" (Daniel Licht) – 3:12
15. "I Can’t Kill" (Daniel Licht) – 2:21
16. "Voodoo Jailtime" (Daniel Licht) – 2:58
17. "New Legs" (Daniel Licht) – 2:01
18. "Photo Albums" (Daniel Licht) – 3:22
19. "Courting the Night" (Daniel Licht) – 1:22
20. "Hide Your Tears" (Daniel Licht) – 1:36
21. "Wink" (Daniel Licht) – 2:08
22. "Astor’s Birthday Party" (Daniel Licht) – 2:00
23. "Epilogue/Bloodroom" (Daniel Licht) – 3:44
24. "Blood Theme" (Daniel Licht) – 2:25
25. "Die This Way" (Daniel Licht, Jon Licht) – 3:55
26. "Fight or Flight" (Daniel Licht) - 1:41 (ITunes Bonus)
27. "Nowhere to Hide" (Daniel Licht) - 1:43 (ITunes Bonus)
28. "The Ice Truck Killer" (Daniel Licht) - 2:56 (ITunes Bonus)
29. "The Fortune" (Daniel Licht) - 1:17 (ITunes Bonus)
30. "Second Season Suite" (Daniel Licht) - 2:01 (ITunes Bonus)

== Songs in other media ==
Blood Theme was also used by Finnish band HIM as an intro song for their recent Venus Doom tour. The song also features on their CD/DVD, Digital Versatile Doom.

Dexter Main Title was also used by American rock band Guns N' Roses as an intro song for their Chinese Democracy tour.
