= Cities of the Underworld =

- Genre: Documentary; History
- Developed by: 34 Productions; Authentic Entertainment
- Starring: Eric Geller (#101–108, #114); Don Wildman
- Country of origin: United States
- Original language: English
- No. of seasons: 3
- No. of episodes: 40

Production
- Executive producers: Sarah Wetherbee; Emre Sahin; Tom Rogan; Lauren Lexton
- Producers: Chris Bray; Erin Comerford; Allison Hynes; Stuart Chait
- Camera setup: Clint Lealos; Christian Ortega; Tim Flick; Anne Etheridge; Emre Sahin
- Running time: 43 minutes

Original release
- Network: History
- Release: March 2, 2007 – February 9, 2009

Cities of the Underworld is an American documentary television series that premiered on March 2, 2007, on the History Channel. The program explores the subterranean environment and culture beneath various civilizations. The series was originally hosted and narrated by Eric Geller for the majority of episodes in season 1, with Don Wildman taking over for the rest of season 1 and seasons 2 and 3.

== Episode list ==
"Istanbul" is the series backdoor pilot which originally aired under the title Ancient Marvels: Cities of the Underworld.

=== Season 1 ===
Production no.	Episode no.	Original Airdate	Episode Title	Location	Host
Pilot/1	101	March 2, 2007	"Istanbul"	Istanbul, Turkey	Eric Geller
2	102	April 23, 2007	"Scotland's Sin City"	Edinburgh, Scotland (features Gilmerton Cove)	Eric Geller
3	103	April 30, 2007	"Hitler's Underground Lair"	Berlin, Germany	Eric Geller
4	104	May 7, 2007	"Rome's Hidden Empire"	Rome, Italy	Eric Geller
5	105	May 14, 2007	"Catacombs of Death"	Paris, France	Eric Geller
6	106	May 21, 2007	"City of Caves"	Budapest, Hungary	Eric Geller
7	107	June 4, 2007	"New York"	New York City, United States	Eric Geller
8	108	June 11, 2007	"London's Lost Cities"	London, England	Eric Geller
9	109	June 18, 2007	"Beneath Vesuvius"	Naples, Italy	Don Wildman
10	110	June 25, 2007	"Freemason Underground"	USA: Boston; Philadelphia; and Concord, Massachusetts	Don Wildman
11	111	July 9, 2007	"Dracula's Underground"	Bucharest, Romania	Don Wildman
12	112	July 16, 2007	"Secret Pagan Underground"	Cappadocia, Turkey	Don Wildman
13	113	July 23, 2007	"Underground Bootleggers"	Portland, Oregon, USA	Don Wildman
14	114	July 30, 2007	"Rome: The Rise"	Rome, Italy	Eric Geller

=== Season 2 ===
Production no.	Episode no.	Original Airdate	Episode Title	Location	Host
15	201	January 28, 2008	"Underground Apocalypse"	Jerusalem, Israel	Don Wildman
16	202	February 4, 2008	"Vietnam"	Ho Chi Minh City, Vietnam and the Vietnamese jungle	Don Wildman
17	203	February 11, 2008	"A-Bomb Underground"	Tokyo and Hiroshima, Japan	Don Wildman
18	204	February 25, 2008	"Viking Underground"	Dublin, Ireland	Don Wildman
19	205	March 3, 2008	"Hitler's Last Secret"	Prague, Czech Republic	Don Wildman
20	206	March 10, 2008	"Maya Underground"	Belize	Don Wildman
21	207	March 17, 2008	"Mob Underground"	Chicago, USA	Don Wildman
22	208	March 24, 2008	"Prophecies From Below"	Jerusalem, Israel	Don Wildman
23	209	March 31, 2008	"New York: Secret Societies"	New York City, USA	Don Wildman
24	210	April 14, 2008	"Washington, D.C.: Seat of Power"	Washington, D.C., USA; Greenbrier County, West Virginia	Don Wildman
25	211	April 21, 2008	"Stalin's Secret Lair"	Moscow, Russia	Don Wildman
26	212	April 28, 2008	"Katrina Underground"	New Orleans, Louisiana, USA	Don Wildman
27	213	May 5, 2008	"Secret Soviet Bases"	Ukraine	Don Wildman

=== Season 3 ===
Production no.	Episode no.	Original Airdate	Episode Title	Location	Host
28	301	October 26, 2008	"City of Blood"	London, England	Don Wildman
29	302	November 2, 2008	"Tunnels of Hell"	Okinawa Island, Japan	Don Wildman
30	303	November 9, 2008	"Real Mafia Underground"	Island of Sicily, Italy	Don Wildman
31	304	November 16, 2008	"Secret Sin City"	Las Vegas, Nevada, USA	Don Wildman
32	305	November 24, 2008	"Hitler's Trenches"	Belgium's Western Front	Don Wildman
33	306	December 1, 2008	"Barbarians' Lair"	Dark Age sites of Luxembourg Belgium and the Netherlands	Don Wildman
34	307	December 8, 2008	"Land of Manson"	Los Angeles, California, USA	Don Wildman
35	308	December 15, 2008	"Gladiators: Blood Sport"	Rome, Italy	Don Wildman
36	309	December 22, 2008	"Secret Holy Land"	Ethiopia	Don Wildman
37	310	January 12, 2009	"Under The Rock"	San Francisco, California, USA	Don Wildman
38	311	January 26, 2009	"Tomb of the Lost Mummies"	Cairo, Egypt	Don Wildman
39	312	February 2, 2009	"Gods of War"	Turkey	Don Wildman
40	313	February 9, 2009	"Alcatraz Down Under"	Sydney, Australia	Don Wildman

=== Season 4 ===
Production no.	Episode no.	Original Airdate	Episode Title	Location	Host
41	401	September 7, 2021	"Mayan Apocolypse"	Yucatán, MEX | FL, USA | GA, USA	Don Wildman
42	402	September 14, 2021	"America's Military Underground"	USA	Don Wildman
43	403	September 21, 2021	"America's Unmapped Murder Tunnels"	Multiple Cities, USA	Don Wildman
44	404	September 28, 2021	"America's Ancient Ancestors"	Great Lakes Area, USA	Don Wildman
45	405	October 5, 2021	"The Pirate Queen's Lair"	Croatia	Don Wildman
46	406	October 18, 2021	"Ancient Underworld Metropolis"		Don Wildman
47	407	October 26, 2021	"The Lost Aztec Colony"		Don Wildman
