= Jersey Belle =

American reality television series

- Genre: Reality television
- Starring: Jaime Primak Sullivan
- Country of origin: United States
- Original language: English
- No. of seasons: 1
- No. of episodes: 8

Production
- Executive producers: Lauren Lexton; Tom Rogan; Sonia Slutsky; Dave Rupel
- Camera setup: Multiple
- Running time: 42 minutes
- Production company: Authentic Entertainment

Original release
- Network: Bravo
- Release: August 4 – September 22, 2014

Jersey Belle is an American reality television series that premiered on August 4, 2014, on Bravo. Announced in April 2014, the docu-series chronicles the life of entertainment publicist Jaime Primak Sullivan as she moves to Birmingham, Alabama and tries to get used to Southern life among the city's wealthy.

== Location ==
Although the show claimed to take place in the wealthy Birmingham, Alabama enclave of Mountain Brook, none of the cast actually lived in Mountain Brook and very little of the town is featured in the series. Most of the show took place in Vestavia Hills, Crestline Heights, and Pelham. There were several cast members with ties to Mountain Brook.

== Episodes ==
No.	Title	Original release date
1	"Knish Out of Water"	August 4, 2014
Originally from New Jersey, publicist Jaime Primak Sullivan moves to Alabama and attempts to adapt to life over there.
2	"Wedding Belles"	August 11, 2014
Jaime helps Luci to get over a breakup; then goes to Los Angeles due to work commitment, later announces her plans to have another child.
3	"Upton Girl"	August 18, 2014
Jaime continues to plan having a baby. Newly single Luci starts dating other people.
4	"Secrets Of The South"	August 25, 2014
Jaime considers adopting a child, although does not disclose her plans to her husband.
5	"Southern Fried Birthday"	September 1, 2014
Luci and Danielle organize a dinner party for Jaime.
6	"Operation New Jersey"	September 8, 2014
The women goes on a trip to New Jerset. Jaime hears bad news.
7	"The Primak Attack"	September 15, 2014
Jaime celebrates Thanksgiving with her family. Jaime and her husband visit a doctor.
8	"The Lake House"	September 22, 2014
Jamie goes to Arden's lake house with her female friends.
