= Jeff Lewis (real estate speculator) =

American real estate speculator, interior designer, television and radio personality

- Born: Jeffrey Thomas Lewis; March 24, 1970 (age 56); Orange County, California, U.S.
- Education: Chapman University
- Occupations: Television and radio personality; real estate speculator; interior designer
- Known for: Flipping Out; Interior Therapy; Property Envy; Hollywood Houselift
- Partner: Gage Edward (2009–2019)
- Children: 1
- Website: jefflewiscompany.com

Jeffrey Thomas Lewis (born March 24, 1970) is an American real estate speculator, interior designer, and television and radio personality. He is best known for his Bravo channel reality show Flipping Out and radio show Jeff Lewis Live.

== Early life and education ==
Lewis was born in Orange County, California, the eldest of three sons of Tom Lewis, a real estate investor, and Cathe Lewis (née Catherine Patricia Averett; 1949-1988), who died of cancer at age 39. He attended Mater Dei High School.

== Career ==
=== Real estate ===
After graduating from Chapman University in 1993, Lewis worked for a real estate broker as a licensed real estate salesperson in California. Lewis has flipped dozens of homes in Los Angeles, his latest being a 4,300 square foot contemporary home he listed in 2018 for $7,995,000. In 2019, he re-listed the home for $6,995,000. Lewis also owns the home next door that he acquired for $3,125,000 in 2016.

=== Interior design ===
Lewis started his own design firm in 2009. In 2010, he was asked by House Beautiful to design their "Kitchen of the Year", which was showcased at Rockefeller Center. Since 2013, he has created lines of products for homes such as paints, rugs, tiles, and doors.

=== Television ===
Flipping Out debuted on July 31, 2007. The show focuses on Lewis' flip projects and his interior design business. The tenth season premiered on August 17, 2017. A spinoff, Interior Therapy with Jeff Lewis debuted on Bravo on March 14, 2012 and ran for two seasons. His series Hollywood Houselift with Jeff Lewis premiered on Freevee on June 10, 2022. He was also a regular panelist on the show Property Envy. A revival of Flipping Out, titled “Still Flipping Out” began airing on Bravo in late September 2026.

=== Radio ===
Since 2017, Lewis has hosted a radio show, Jeff Lewis Live, on Andy Cohen's SiriusXM Radio Andy network.

On June 12, 2023, Sirius XM launched the Jeff Lewis Channel, a streaming channel found on the Sirius XM app.

== Personal life ==
Lewis was in a relationship with his business manager, Gage Edward. They had a baby via surrogate, born in 2016. They separated in 2019 after being together for ten years. They share custody of their daughter.

Lewis was diagnosed with obsessive-compulsive personality disorder in his twenties.
