= Lock 'n Load (TV series) =

- Genre: Reality show
- Created by: Josh T. Ryan & Tony Lawrence
- Written by: Josh T. Ryan & Tony Lawrence
- Starring: Josh T. Ryan
- Voices of: Josh T. Ryan
- Narrated by: Josh T. Ryan
- Theme music composer: Simon Bailey
- Composer: Simon Bailey
- Country of origin: United States
- Original language: English
- No. of seasons: 1
- No. of episodes: 6

Production
- Executive producers: Josh T. Ryan, Tony Lawrence, Lauren Lexton, Tom Rogan
- Producer: Authentic Entertainment
- Cinematography: Mark Lafluer
- Editors: Craig A. Colton, Drew Nichols, Erik Hansen
- Camera setup: Dave Cassella
- Running time: 27 minutes

Original release
- Network: Showtime
- Release: October 21 – November 25, 2009

Lock 'n Load is a six-part, unscripted, hidden-camera American reality television series that premiered on October 21, 2009, on Showtime. It is based at The Shootist gun store in Englewood, Colorado, and focuses on a high-volume salesman, Josh T. Ryan, while examining the gun enthusiast lifestyle.
