= Addi Somekh =

American balloon artist

- Born: August 1, 1972 (age 54); Hollywood, California
- Education: UC Santa Cruz; New School for Social Research
- Known for: balloon twisting; balloon bass
- Style: improvisation
- Website: www.newballoonart.com; www.balloonhat.com; www.balloonbass.com

Addi Somekh (born August 1, 1972) is a self-taught balloon artist who has been twisting balloons since 1991. Best known for his balloon hats, Somekh's other signature pieces include the balloon flower, balloon ring, and large-scale balloon sculptures. In addition to his balloon twisting, Somekh is an author, university philosophy instructor, and musician. With photographer Charles (Charlie) Eckert, Somekh traveled around the world creating balloon hats for people of various backgrounds, cultures, and beliefs in an effort to demonstrate the power of joy and laughter. These journeys have been photo-documented in calendars, books, and films.

== Background ==
Somekh was born in Hollywood, California, in 1972. As an undergraduate, Somekh attended UC Santa Cruz, where he met painter Mary Holmes, who became his mentor. Somekh later published a book about Mary Holmes’ artworks with photographs by Charlie Eckert and interviews with the artist.

In the early 1990s, Somekh's balloon twisting began as a means to “pay his car insurance” and make extra money when he was 19-years-old. While attending graduate school at the New School for Social Research, where he majored in human resource management, he continued developing his talents and made a living twisting balloons at bar mitzvahs, elementary schools, and corporate parties. Somekh said he enjoyed balloon twisting as a profession because he didn't have a boss and could make cash improvising balloon hats and keeping the job interesting without having someone looking over his shoulder.

== Balloon hats and improvisation ==
Somekh's style of balloon hat making is in large part based on improvisation. He says that he reads a person's aura; he then measures the head as a foundation and builds from there. Somekh claims to colors and shapes coming out of people's heads, and says he recreates these patterns and plays upon them with the balloons. In a 2018 TEDxPaloAlto talk titled "Balloon Art and the Mysterious Nature of Joy," Somekh claimed that balloon hat improvisation leads to joy, which he describes as an instinctive and therapeutic reaction. Somekh credits the NYC jazz quartet Sex Mob and the photographer James Nacthwey as his improvisational inspirations.

== Travels and publications ==
Somekh met amateur photographer Charlie Eckert in 1995. After witnessing the effect they had when wearing balloon hats to a Halloween party, they planned to travel the world making balloon hats for people of divergent cultures and backgrounds. During their travels, they tested their theory of the universal response of joy and laughter.

They visited 34 countries and 20 of the United States on a self-funded balloon hat world tour between 1996 and 1999. These travels are documented in three calendars (2002, 2003, 2004) titled “The Varieties of the Balloon Hat Experience,” and a book called The Inflatable Crown, released by Chronicle Books in 2001. Their journeys were covered by InTouch Weekly, the Los Angeles Times, LA Weekly and Bizarre (magazine). Somekh and his Balloon Bass appeared on NPR on September 3, 2003, in an interview and segment produced by Rory Johnston.

== Exhibits ==
Somekh's balloon art has been displayed in several museum and cultural center exhibits. In 2008, the Skirball Cultural Center hosted The Inflatable Crown, a show of Eckert's photographs of Somekh's balloon hats and a documentary highlighting their travels. Balloon sculptures by Somekh were later displayed at the Santa Cruz Museum of Art and History for a fall 2017 show. Ballooniverse featured three changing installations crafted entirely out of balloons: Balloon Garden, The Elephant and Six Blind Men, and Balloon Graffiti with Spray Paint Artist Cernesto. At the end of 2017, Somekh also helped produce The Great Mystery Show, an exhibit at the American Visionary Art Museum featuring the work of blind South Korean balloon artist HongSeok Goh. Together, the artists collaborated with seven other balloon twisters to create a giant sculptures of turtles, elephants, and dragons.

== Teaching ==
During an art residency at Cowell College of UC Santa Cruz in 2012, Somekh founded the Balloon Art Brigade, an organization aiming to teach people how to make balloon art and use it to spread joy in their communities.

In 2014, Somekh began teaching a philosophy course at Cowell College. His course, "Meaning, Paradox, and Love: Mary Holmes and Beyond", has grown from 13 to 130 students in four years.

== Balloon Music ==
Somekh credits his balloon twisting to his lack of talent as a musician and childhood dream of becoming a jazz musician. Balloon twisting eventually led him back to music in the form of the Balloon Bass, an instrument that Somekh has played in his band, Unpopable (a.k.a. “Balloon Bass”), since 2005. For every performance, Somekh creates a new balloon bass and pops it at the end of the show.

The first Unpopable album The Gift/Curse Combo was released in 2007. Somekh started Unpopable with guitarist Henry Bermudez in 2005, but the band is currently composed of Somekh on balloon bass and Joey Maramba on electric bass. In 2014, the band released an album called The Unpopable Trio with Alfredo Ortiz, and in 2018, they released an album called Tunnel Buddies with several percussionists.

Somekh crafted the balloon bass after contracting Lyme disease during a photo shoot for Martha Stewart Magazine in August 2003. Afterwards, he moved to Los Angeles while bedridden for 8 months. During this time, he learned to play the balloon bass, as he could still move his fingers while stuck in bed.

In 1992, Sean Rooney devised the principle behind the balloon resonator and invented an instrument he called the Balloon Guitar. In 2000, Rooney showed Somekh how to make the resonator, which Somekh then modified several times to make the Balloon Bass. Somekh has since created other balloon instruments, including drums and flutes, and has composed music and improvised with a variety of balloon and non-balloon musicians, such as New York-based jazz drummer Kenny Wollesen, Wilco guitarist Nels Cline, Money Mark, Alfredo Ortiz, and the Jamaican dub engineer The Scientist (musician).

== Film and television ==
In 1997, filmmaker Andy Vermouth met Somekh and Eckhert in West Africa and made a documentary about their travels. The Balloonhat Movie, released in 2005, follows Somekh and Eckhert for two years as they traveled through Brazil, Bosnia, Serbia, Israel, and on to Egypt and the American South. The film won several awards including the 2005 Creative Spirit Award at the Santa Fe Film Festival and the 2006 Best Feature Documentary at the Durango Independent Film Festival.

On Monday, February 7, 2011, The Learning Channel (TLC) debuted The Unpoppables, a reality show detailing the exploits and adventures of Somekh and his balloon decorating company, New Balloon Art. The team of Somekh, Katie Balloons and Brian Asman are recorded taking on an array of challenging balloon commissions. The show was produced by Authentic Entertainment.
