= Flipping Out =

American reality television series

- Genre: Reality
- Starring: Jeff Lewis
- Country of origin: United States
- Original language: English
- No. of seasons: 11
- No. of episodes: 108

Production
- Executive producers: Andrew Hoegl; Lauren Lexton; Tom Rogan
- Running time: 44 minutes
- Production company: Authentic Entertainment

Original release
- Network: Bravo
- Release: July 31, 2007 – November 20, 2018

Related
- Interior Therapy with Jeff Lewis; Still Flipping Out

Flipping Out is an American reality television series that aired on Bravo from July 31, 2007, to November 20, 2018. The show centers on designer Jeff Lewis in Los Angeles, his executive assistant Jenni Pulos, his housekeeper Zoila Chavez, his business manager and boyfriend Gage Edward, as well as his other assistants and staff. In 2014, Flipping Out was nominated for an Emmy award in the Outstanding Unstructured Reality Program category.

The program ran for 11 seasons before being canceled in 2018. Lewis claims the cancelation was due to the departure of co-host Jenni Pulos after the pair had a personal falling out.

A rebooted version of the series that focuses less on home improvement projects and more on Lewis' SiriusXM weekly Chumps Happy Hour show, Still Flipping Out, premiered on September 28, 2026. Besides Lewis, only Vanina Alfaro and Tyler Meyerkoth from the original series have made appearances on Still Flipping Out.

== Cast ==
- Jeff Lewis
- Jenni Pulos Nassos
- Zoila Chavez (seasons 1–10)
- Ryan Brown (seasons 1–3)
- Chris Elwood (seasons 1–2)
- Stephen Bowman (season 1)
- Jett Pink (season 2–5)
- Chris Keslar (season 2)
- Sarah Berkman (seasons 3–5)
- Trace James Lehnhoff (seasons 3–5)
- Gage Edward (seasons 5–11)
- Andrew Coleman (seasons 5–7)
- Katrina Stagg (seasons 5-7)
- Vanina Alfaro (seasons 5–10)
- Megan Weaver (seasons 7–11)
- Matthew Ryan (seasons 8–9)
- Joe Potts (season 8)
- Tyler Meyerkorth (season 11)

== Episodes ==
=== Series overview ===
Season	Episodes	Originally released	
Season	Episodes	First released	Last released
1	7	July 31, 2007	September 11, 2007
2	9	June 17, 2008	August 12, 2008
3	11	August 18, 2009	October 27, 2009
4	10	August 10, 2010	October 12, 2010
5	11	July 6, 2011	September 13, 2011
6	12	September 4, 2012	November 27, 2012
7	10	March 5, 2014	May 7, 2014
8	8	July 1, 2015	August 19, 2015
9	10	July 13, 2016	September 15, 2016
10	10	August 17, 2017	October 19, 2017
11	10	September 11, 2018	November 20, 2018

=== Season 1 (2007) ===
No. overall	No. in season	Title	Original release date
1	1	"A New Project (Buy Low, Sell High)"	July 31, 2007
2	2	"Under Pressure (Monkey Puncture)"	August 7, 2007
3	3	"Betting Men (The Bet)"	August 14, 2007
4	4	"Bargaining Tactics (The Art of Negotiation)"	August 21, 2007
5	5	"Inspections (The Inspector)"	August 28, 2007
6	6	"Moving On, Looking Forward (We Appreciate You)"	September 4, 2007
7	7	"Jeff Lewis' Open House (A Watch What Happens Special)"	September 11, 2007

=== Season 2 (2008) ===
No. overall	No. in season	Title	Original release date
8	1	"Sell Out"	June 17, 2008
9	2	"The Flip Side"	June 24, 2008
10	3	"Good Cop/Bad Jeff"	July 1, 2008
11	4	"Closer Inspection"	July 8, 2008
12	5	"Tear Down"	July 15, 2008
13	6	"Looks Like New"	July 22, 2008
14	7	"Tapped Out"	July 29, 2008
15	8	"Back in the Market"	August 5, 2008
16	9	"Reunion Special"	August 12, 2008

=== Season 3 (2009) ===
No. overall	No. in season	Title	Original release date
17	1	"Beware of Falling Houses"	August 18, 2009
18	2	"Pajamas and Other Games"	August 25, 2009
19	3	"Never Trust a Contractor"	September 1, 2009
20	4	"Bad Mojo"	September 8, 2009
21	5	"Jenni 911"	September 15, 2009
22	6	"Friend or Foe"	September 22, 2009
23	7	"Irreconcilable Differences"	September 29, 2009
24	8	"Pledging Allegiance"	October 6, 2009
25	9	"Spirit of the Land"	October 13, 2009
26	10	"Baby Boom"	October 20, 2009
27	11	"Reunion Special"	October 27, 2009

=== Season 4 (2010) ===
No. overall	No. in season	Title	Original release date
28	1	"Hot Streak, Lots of Baggage"	August 10, 2010
29	2	"Hard to Break Family"	August 17, 2010
30	3	"Urine Trouble"	August 24, 2010
31	4	"Never Mix Food With Business"	August 31, 2010
32	5	"Bright Lewis, Big City"	September 7, 2010
33	6	"Too Much of a Good Thing"	September 14, 2010
34	7	"Hazard: Jeff at Work"	September 21, 2010
35	8	"It's Not Me, It's You"	September 28, 2010
36	9	"Never According to Planner"	October 5, 2010
37	10	"Rock, Paper and the Kitchen Sink"	October 12, 2010

=== Season 5 (2011) ===
No. overall	No. in season	Title	Original release date	U.S. viewers (millions)
38	1	"New Kid on the Block"	July 6, 2011	1.07
39	2	"Wake-up Call"	July 12, 2011	1.25
40	3	"New York or Bust"	July 19, 2011	0.94
41	4	"What Stays in Vegas"	July 26, 2011	1.22
42	5	"Dropping the Axe"	August 2, 2011	1.29
43	6	"Don't Be Tardy to the Party"	August 9, 2011	1.47
44	7	"Showdown at Sunshine Terrace"	August 16, 2011	1.46
45	8	"Money Changes Everything"	August 23, 2011	1.43
46	9	"Substitutes"	August 30, 2011	1.48
47	10	"There's No Place Like Home"	September 6, 2011	1.76
48	11	"Reunion"	September 13, 2011	1.39

=== Season 6 (2012) ===
No. overall	No. in season	Title	Original release date	U.S. viewers (millions)
49	1	"A House Divided"	September 4, 2012	1.35
50	2	"Showdown in Chi Town"	September 11, 2012	1.22
51	3	"Drawing the Line"	September 18, 2012	1.19
52	4	"The Talented Mr. Coleman"	September 25, 2012	1.20
53	5	"House of Lies"	October 2, 2012	1.27
54	6	"Bad Move"	October 9, 2012	1.06
55	7	"Cleaning House"	October 16, 2012	0.81
56	8	"Windy City Wedding"	October 23, 2012	1.15
57	9	"Barbie Bitch"	October 30, 2012	0.97
58	10	"Grandma's House"	November 13, 2012	1.08
59	11	"Cabogate"	November 20, 2012	1.09
60	12	"Til Death Do Us Part"	November 27, 2012	1.25

=== Season 7 (2014) ===
No. overall	No. in season	Title	Original release date	U.S. viewers (millions)
61	1	"When the Water Breaks"	March 5, 2014	0.99
62	2	"The New Girl"	March 12, 2014	0.80
63	3	"Road Trip"	March 19, 2014	0.95
64	4	"Back Flipping"	March 26, 2014	0.83
65	5	"Due Date"	April 2, 2014	1.08
66	6	"Flipping Nashville"	April 9, 2014	1.15
67	7	"Want You Back"	April 16, 2014	1.17
68	8	"Out of Bounds"	April 23, 2014	1.06
69	9	"No Respect"	April 30, 2014	0.82
70	10	"Retreat"	May 7, 2014	0.80

=== Season 8 (2015) ===
No. overall	No. in season	Title	Original release date	U.S. viewers (millions)
71	1	"What the Flip!"	July 1, 2015	0.84
72	2	"A New Gage in Town"	July 8, 2015	0.86
73	3	"Womb for Rent"	July 15, 2015	0.70
74	4	"It's Sabotage"	July 22, 2015	0.79
75	5	"DSI: Design Scene Investigation"	July 29, 2015	0.84
76	6	"Say Hello to Hollywood"	August 5, 2015	0.98
77	7	"Trouble in Paradise"	August 12, 2015	1.05
78	8	"The House That Jeff Built"	August 19, 2015	1.04

=== Season 9 (2016) ===
No. overall	No. in season	Title	Original release date	U.S. viewers (millions)
79	1	"Appetite For Demolition"	July 13, 2016	0.98
80	2	"Todo Limpio"	July 14, 2016	0.92
81	3	"Ready Set Glow"	July 21, 2016	1.01
82	4	"Scope of Work"	July 28, 2016	0.82
83	5	"Mary, Mary Quite Contrary"	August 4, 2016	0.94
84	6	"It's Not Your Fault"	August 18, 2016	0.84
85	7	"I Know What You Did Last Saturday"	August 25, 2016	0.97
86	8	"Unagi You Didn't!"	September 1, 2016	1.06
87	9	"What The Duck?"	September 8, 2016	1.09
88	10	"The End Is Nigh"	September 15, 2016	1.00

=== Season 10 (2017) ===
No. overall	No. in season	Title	Original release date	U.S. viewers (millions)
89	1	"What Will Jeff Do?"	August 17, 2017	0.93
90	2	"Two Week Notice"	August 24, 2017	0.87
91	3	"Well, Hello, Monroe"	August 31, 2017	0.99
92	4	"Welcome Home, Monroe"	September 7, 2017	0.98
93	5	"Baby Brain"	September 14, 2017	1.02
94	6	"Baby's First Move"	September 21, 2017	1.03
95	7	"Oh My, Versailles"	September 28, 2017	0.93
96	8	"The Gema Dilemma"	October 5, 2017	0.96
97	9	"The Good, the Bad, the Goodbye"	October 12, 2017	1.10
98	10	"Full Circle"	October 19, 2017	0.95

=== Season 11 (2018) ===
No. overall	No. in season	Title	Original release date	U.S. viewers (millions)
99	1	"A Series of Unfortunate Flips"	September 11, 2018	0.87
100	2	"Furniture Porn"	September 18, 2018	0.67
101	3	"A Very Lewis Christmas"	September 25, 2018	0.73
102	4	"All That Glitters"	October 2, 2018	0.71
103	5	"Edward vs. Lewis"	October 9, 2018	0.69
104	6	"The Straw(berry) That Broke the Camel's Back"	October 16, 2018	0.82
105	7	"Diamonds Aren't Forever"	October 30, 2018	0.78
106	8	"Trimming the Fat"	November 6, 2018	0.73
107	9	"Destructive Criticism"	November 13, 2018	0.83
108	10	"The Final Flip"	November 20, 2018	1.00

== Broadcast ==
Internationally, the series airs in Canada on Slice, in Australia on Arena, in New Zealand on Bravo and in the Netherlands on RTL 5. The entire series is sporadically available on the Bravo channel on the PlutoTV reality streaming platform.
