= Interior Therapy with Jeff Lewis =

- Genre: Reality
- Starring: Jeff Lewis; Jenni Pulos; Zoila Chavez
- Country of origin: United States
- Original language: English
- No. of seasons: 2
- No. of episodes: 20

Production
- Executive producers: Lauren Lexton; Sara Mast; Tom Rogan
- Running time: 44 minutes
- Production company: Authentic Entertainment

Original release
- Network: Bravo
- Release: March 14, 2012 – September 10, 2013

Related
- Flipping Out

Interior Therapy with Jeff Lewis is an American reality television series that debuted March 14, 2012, on Bravo. It is a spin-off from Lewis' other Bravo show Flipping Out, and features both Jenni Pulos and Zoila Chavez.

== Format ==
The show features Jeff Lewis and Jenni Pulos visiting the homes of clients and staying with them while a renovation takes place. As well as redecorating, Lewis attempts to rectify problems with his clients' relationships.

== Production ==
During season 2 of Flipping Out, executives at Bravo began pitching spin-off show ideas to Lewis, as they initially saw the original show as having a lifespan of around three seasons. Most of the pitches were generic home improvement shows, and Lewis argued to keep a reality television element in the new project. The show wasn't designed to replace Flipping Out, but instead airs earlier in the year than Lewis' first Bravo show.

Interior Therapy was announced as one of eleven new shows on Bravo on March 30, 2011, with production by Authentic Entertainment. The show features both Jenni Pulos and Zoila Chavez in addition to Lewis from Flipping Out. The cast launched the show at the Bravo presentation at the Television Critics Association in January 2012. At the end of one of the episodes, the couple splits up. One of the producers wanted to film it in a way which would present it as a happy ending, but Lewis argued for a more authentic finish. He later described it as his favorite episode of the first season. The series airs on Arena in Australia.

The series was renewed for a second season on April 2, 2013, which premiered on July 9, 2013.

== Episodes ==
=== Series overview ===
Season	Episodes	Originally released	
Season	Episodes	First released	Last released
1	10	March 14, 2012	May 16, 2012
2	10	July 9, 2013	September 10, 2013

=== Season 1 (2012) ===
No. overall	No. in season	Title	Original release date	U.S. viewers (millions)
1	1	"Almost Perfect"	March 14, 2012	0.78
While renovating a master suite, the team suffers a number of plumbing accidents.
2	2	"Charity Begins at Home"	March 21, 2012	0.75
Jeff creates an art gallery in the basement of the home of Robert Lorsch and Kira Reed but must convince Lorsch to part with some of his collection first.
3	3	"A House Divided"	March 28, 2012	0.93
They must renovate a house which was inherited by the owner from his aunt and is still full of her belongings.
4	4	"Ross Is the Boss"	April 4, 2012	0.82
The team renovates a garage for Ross Mathews and his partner Salvador.
5	5	"Panic in Pasadena"	April 11, 2012	0.94
Jeff and the team attempt to help out a life coach who he thinks has hoarding tendencies.
6	6	"All That Glitters"	April 18, 2012	0.81
The team helps a couple who have not yet come to terms with sharing the design work on their property.
7	7	"Mama's House"	April 25, 2012	1.03
Jeff helps a couple whose mother-in-law calls the shots on what happens in their house.
8	8	"Mismatched"	May 2, 2012	0.99
The team help to change the design of a home so that the owner's girlfriend can move in.
9	9	"Design Bully"	May 9, 2012	0.91
Help is lent to a home-owner who Jeff really doesn't get along with.
10	10	"Comedy Is Not Pretty"	May 16, 2012	0.95
Jeff helps comedian Mark DeCarlo.

=== Season 2 (2013) ===
No. overall	No. in season	Title	Original release date	U.S. viewers (millions)
11	1	"Fabulous Delusion"	July 9, 2013	0.92
The team meets a new client who is very critical towards Jeff's work.
12	2	"Cats, Cats, Cats"	July 16, 2013	0.95
Jeff and Jenni deals with a very interesting female client who collects stray cats.
13	3	"Jillian's Job Swap"	July 23, 2013	0.97
Jillian Barberie departs from her work and asks Jeff to help her to decorate her house as she becomes a full-time housewive.
14	4	"The Castle"	July 30, 2013	0.91
Jeff meets a newly married woman who lives in an old castle.
15	5	"Kid Rules"	August 6, 2013	1.13
Jenni and Jeff help a family to work on their home's design highly influenced by their toddle.
16	6	"Odd Couple"	August 13, 2013	1.16
Jeff deals with a couple who disagree a lot when it comes to designing their home.
17	7	"Goth No More"	August 20, 2013	1.13
Jeff works in a house of a goth couple.
18	8	"Tough Girls"	August 27, 2013	1.05
The team works for a couple in New York who are in the middle of revamping their relationship.
19	9	"Who's on First?"	September 3, 2013	1.05
Jeff and Jenni redecorates the home of Lou Costello's granddaughter.
20	10	"OCDmented"	September 10, 2013	1.21
The design team helps a newly married couple to design their house.
