= Metropolis (American TV program) =

- Genre: Travel documentary
- Starring: Various hosts
- Narrated by: Stanley Tucci
- Country of origin: United States
- Original language: English
- No. of seasons: 1
- No. of episodes: 6

Production
- Running time: 60 minutes
- Production company: Nutopia

Original release
- Network: Travel Channel
- Release: January 4 – September 24, 2015

Metropolis is a travel guide documentary television program that explores the culture and history of some of the major metropolitan cities in the world. The six-episode program premiered on January 4, 2015, on the Travel Channel, and aired its final episode on September 24, 2015. Featuring some of the most iconic attractions in the city and its rich culture, it includes guest commentaries by noted celebrities such as Samantha Brown and Andrew Zimmern among others.

== Episodes ==
No.	Title	Original release date
1	"Manhattan"	January 4, 2015
2	"San Francisco"	January 4, 2015
3	"Rome"	June 18, 2015
4	"London"	June 18, 2015
5	"Paris"	September 24, 2015
6	"New Orleans"	September 24, 2015
