= Gilmerton Cove =

Tunnels in Edinburgh, Scotland

Coordinates: 55°54′20″N 3°8′0″W

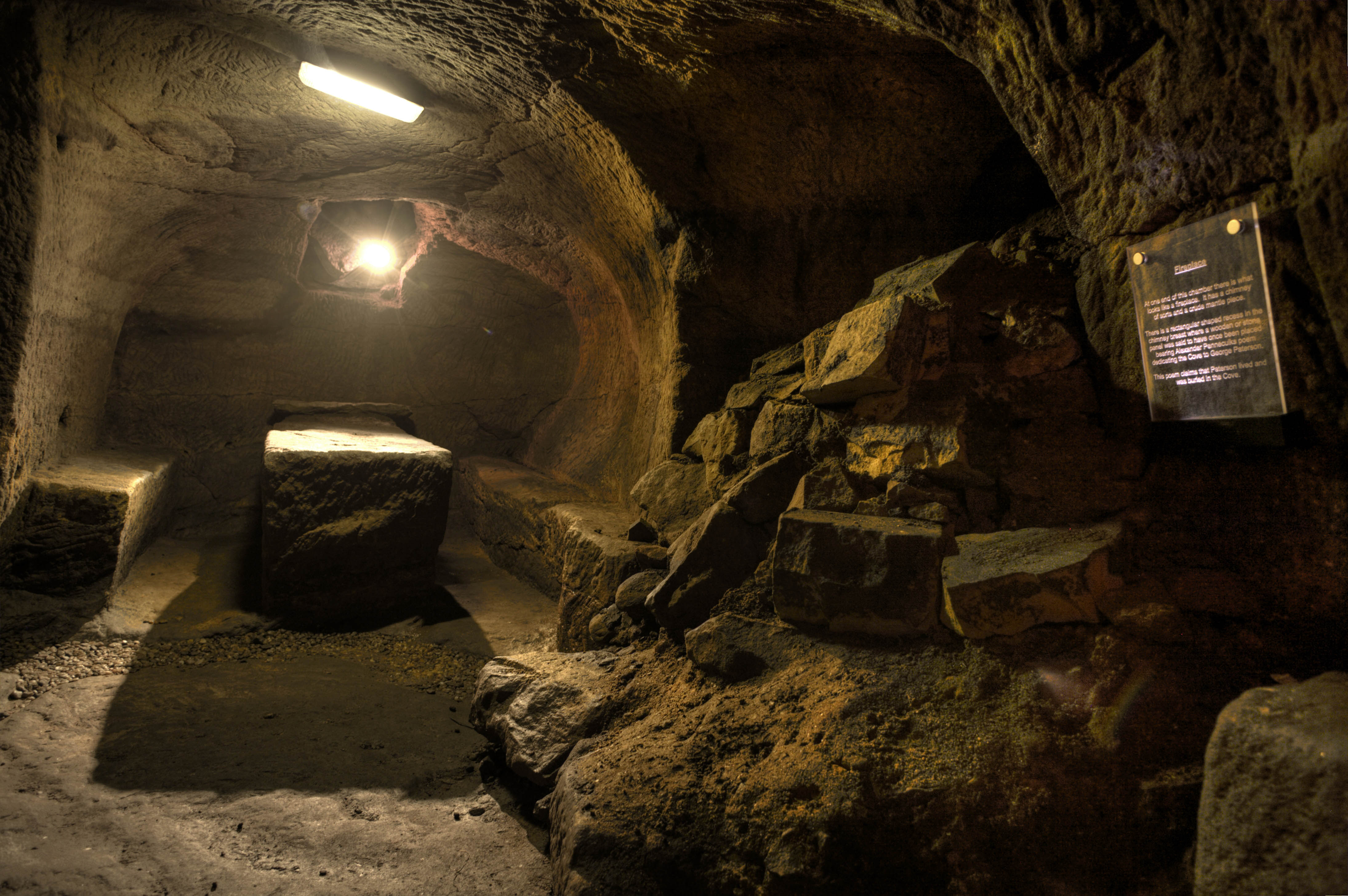
A passageway in Gilmerton Cove.

Gilmerton Cove is a series of underground passageways and chambers hand-carved from sandstone located beneath the streets of Gilmerton, an ex-mining village, now a southeastern suburb of Edinburgh, Scotland. There has been much speculation about the origins of the Cove and its purpose.

The cove was restored and opened as a tourist attraction in 2003. It operated until the COVID-19 pandemic, and is closed as of 2023.

== History ==
In 1721 the cove was first mentioned in the local Kirk (church) minutes where George Paterson (a blacksmith or baker) was accused of selling alcohol on the sabbath to many people as they visited his 'caves'.

Extensive archaeological and historical research has failed to resolve the mystery. In 2017, research by scientists from University of St Andrews and University of Edinburgh using ground-penetrating radar indicated that the network of passageways and chambers may be more extensive than that currently exposed.

It has been suggested that it was used as a drinking den for local gentry, a Covenanters refuge, meeting place for the Hellfire Club and a smugglers' lair.

A five-year collaborative project between Gilmerton Heritage Trust and The City of Edinburgh Council allowed the newly restored Cove to open in 2003 as an educational resource for the community as well as a place to visit. This included a research project into the archaeology and history of the Cove by CFA Archaeology Ltd with historical research by Richard Oram.

The cove was operated as a tourist attraction until it was closed during the COVID-19 pandemic. It is still closed as of 2023.

== See also ==
- Tunnels in popular culture - Ley tunnels as escape tunnels, etc
- Cleeves Cove - a natural cave system once used by Covenanters
