= Off Limits (TV series) =

- Genre: Reality; Documentary
- Written by: Avgail Schotz; Jill Michelle Williams
- Starring: Don Wildman
- Composer: Wild Woods (music)
- Country of origin: United States
- Original language: English
- No. of seasons: 3
- No. of episodes: 30

Production
- Executive producers: Lauren Lexton; Tom Rogan
- Cinematography: Mark LaFleur, Christian Ortega
- Editors: M.J. Loheed, Drew Nichols
- Camera setup: Multiple-camera
- Running time: 60 minutes
- Production company: Endemol Company

Original release
- Network: Travel Channel
- Release: May 16, 2011 – June 11, 2013

Off Limits is an American reality television series that premiered on May 16, 2011, on the Travel Channel. The series features "untold stories and secrets" of America's most iconic cities as host Don Wildman ventures and sometimes trespasses through unexplored areas where not many people have dared to go before. First season episodes aired every Monday at 9 PM EST.

The second season premiered on Tuesday April 17, 2012 at 10 PM EST. For the remainder of the season, one episode aired on a Thursday at 8 PM EST while the last few episodes were burned off on Sundays at 9 AM EST.

The third season premiered on Tuesday June 4, 2013 at 10 PM EST.

== Synopsis ==
Adventure seeker and series host Don Wildman travels across America ignoring the warning signs to explore dangerous "off-limit" areas in major cities throughout the United States – cities that may just be a tourist destination for ordinary travelers, but for Wildman and his crew of urban spelunkers, are like embarking on a journey to rediscover a city's past by uncovering its secret history.

In the introduction, Wildman states:

In every city, every town are places sealed off from the rest of the world hiding their amazing stories behind locked doors inside barbwire where they say you cannot go. I'm Don Wildman, and these are the places I live to explore. The ones they tell you are... Off Limits.

Season 2 introduction, Wildman says:

Warning: Going off limits can be hazardous to your health. Whether it's flying the Goodyear Blimp or pulling an all-nighter in New York. It's accelerated; it's excavated...it's Off Limits.

== Episodes ==
=== Season 1 (2011) ===
No.	Title	Original release date
1	"Los Angeles"	May 16, 2011
In the season premiere, Don Wildman travels to the "City of Angels", his hometown, where he goes kayaking in the L.A. River, ventures inside the hidden L.A. aqueducts, infiltrates a former Nazi military camp high in the valley, climbs one of many active clandestine oil rigs next to a neighborhood, and navigates the miles-long stretch of "lost canals" in Venice Beach.
2	"Seattle"	May 23, 2011
Wildman reveals the "Emerald City" from the Space Needle, rides the rails of the Electron Project in a rail car where the tracks are right above a 10-mile water plume, tries to find the remains of the USS Burton, a Mosquito Fleet steamboat that sunk in the Gig Harbor near Puget Sound, goes underneath the 520 floating bridge, explores a remote tunnel pass in the Cascade Mountains where an avalanche occurred, and climbs to the top of a massive Douglas fir in the Seattle rain forest to cut it down.
3	"San Francisco"	June 6, 2011
Don travels to "The Bay City" where he discovers an old dungeon for punishment cells in San Quentin State Prison, travels to the Navy fleet of ghost ships destined for the scrap heap in the Suisun Bay and goes aboard the USS Iowa. He also visits Oak Knoll Naval Hospital where L. Ron Hubbard was a patient and thought up the inspiration for Scientology, investigates Camp Tracy, an old World War II internment camp, a "black site" for Japanese POWs where Japanese American translators would interrogate them, and heads to the once rough side of town to explore Pier 70, which is now an abandoned ship yard building.
4	"Arizona"	June 13, 2011
During his trip to Tucson, Wildman discovers how pioneers created cities in the desert to create populated cities and uncovers a secret missile silo called Site 17 from the 1960s with Titan II nuclear weapons so powerful it could have started World War III. He learns the legend of the old Dutchman Mine in Goldfield where thousands of miners flocked to find the richest ore in the world and goes panning for gold at the Old Wasp Mine. Then he wanders around the massive compound of "The Boneyard", a final stop for retired U.S. war planes at Davis Monthan AFB, where they are restored by AMARG for museums. Don also explores the Theodore Roosevelt Dam that runs on hydro-electric power which helped Phoenix grow as a bustling city, and the Biosphere 2, an experimental self-contained Martian space colony in the Sonoran Desert.
5	"Tennessee"	June 20, 2011
While in "The Volunteer State", rough waters of the Nolichucky River cause Wildman to get thrown overboard while traveling down a Class IV river on a rafting trip to find the ruins of "Lost Cove", a hidden moonshining town deep in the Appalachian Mountains. Then it's off to the Great Smoky Mountains to make "White Lightning" moonshine by grinding corn at the Valentine Mill and bottling the hooch at the Ole Smoky Distillery in Knoxville. Next, Don learns about the local legend of Underground Chattanooga when citizens took it upon themselves to re-build their town 10 feet above water level after a flood wiped the town out in 1867. Also Don explores the drift mine of McNabb and a limestone cave system at the Mt. Raccoon reservoir and power plant in eastern Tennessee.
6	"Buffalo"	June 27, 2011
Don travels to frigid Buffalo, New York in the middle of winter to investigate the abandoned and haunted Buffalo Central Terminal and visits a five-story health castle-like resort that detoxified its guests with shock treatments. He also discovers an old tunnel system from the early 19th century, gets access to a 100-year-old powerhouse run by the direct current transformers of Nikola Tesla, and explores concrete grain elevators that line the Buffalo River.
7	"Secrets of New York Islands"	October 4, 2011
Don follows the endless waterways to find out how the islands of New York made the greatest city in the world possible. He gets access to Castle Williams on Governor's Island, an isolated stronghold from the 19th century that once saved New York City, uncovers the ruins of Bannerman's Castle on Pollepel Island, the fantasy island arsenal of the biggest arms dealer on earth, canoes through a tugboat and ferry graveyard in Staten Island, and investigates Long Island's Gold Coast mansions, Land's End and on the verge of ruin, Myron C. Taylor House, and scrambles around the forgotten remains of the Renwick Smallpox Hospital (once nicknamed "Dead House") on Roosevelt Island, an island once used to keep the less desirables out of the city.
8	"Dirty Secrets of Boston"	October 11, 2011
Don goes underground in Boston for a look at America's first subway, "The T" that broke ground in 1895, where workers discovered a mass grave with 900 skeletons that included British soldiers from the Battle of Bunker Hill. Then he takes to "The Interceptor", a 130-year-old tunnel in a sewage super highway, Main Sewage Works, built under the city in Dorchester that was one of the first centralized sewers in the country. Don also checks out the second-largest waste treatment plant in the U.S., an innovative structure on Deer Island that helped clean up the once-filthy Boston Harbor, and climbs one of the plant's high-tech windmills that provides power to the city. Lastly, he investigates Fort Strong on Long Island, a concrete fort built in the 1890s that was a part of a coastal defense system to protect the city from warships.
9	"Transforming The Big Apple"	October 18, 2011
Don returns to New York City and uncovers the Big Apple's hidden secrets. First, he goes inside the Washington Arch in Washington Square Park, then he explores the Sawmill River, the 20-mile river that runs beneath the streets of Yonkers that is under restoration for the town's riverwalk project. Next, it's off to Brooklyn to go canoeing in the filthy Gowanus Canal and under the Brower's Mill Bridge which was used in Washington's retreat from the British during the Battle of Brooklyn. Don also checks out the labyrinth beneath Plymouth Church, a place once called the "central grand depot of the Underground Railroad" run by Henry Ward Beecher in Brooklyn Heights. Then he investigates Brooklyn's Green-Wood Cemetery, one of the most exclusive cemeteries in the country. Lastly, he goes to Coney Island Creek to climb aboard a homemade submarine named Quester built by steelworker Jerry Bianco to find sunken treasure on the Andrea Doria.
10	"Hawaii"	October 25, 2011
Don travels to Hawaii to visit Coco Palms Resort on Coconut Coast in Kauai, a once-popular resort for the rich and famous now ravaged by Hurricane Iniki in 1992. Then it is across the island to Koloa to explore the rusty remains of Hawaii's first sugar plantation from 1836, and rides ATVs up the mountains to Huleia River to find the water source of the Waita Reservoir, the largest man-made reservoir in the state. He then checks out the Tersuo Harano Tunnel, a hi-tech tunnel system bored into a dormant volcano at the base of the Ko'olau Mountains to make way for the "H-3", a huge highway that comes out of Honolulu which took 37 years to build. He also uncovers secret bunkers from World War II and an abandoned hospital on Ford Island, discovers a cave sewer system under the town of Waikiki Beach, and learns about ancient Hawaiian blood rituals.
11	"St. Louis"	November 1, 2011
Don visits St. Louis to explore the city's rapid change through the years and gets up close and personal with the mighty Mississippi River when he transverses the Eads Bridge, a steel train bridge over the river. He sees how St. Louis became the brewing capital of the U.S. when he visits the historic Lemp Brewery complex in Benton Park and goes into the honeycomb caves used to store the lager beer below. Then he explores the Ashley Street Power Station that was constructed in 1902 for the 1904 World's Fair and to provide electricity to the city. Also, Don checks out the decapitated Cotton Belt Freight Depot which delivered cotton to the city by a greedy robber baron. Lastly, he climbs atop the first dome made of cast and raw iron in America inside the old court house.
12	"Pittsburgh"	November 10, 2011
Wildman visits Pittsburgh, the steel-making capital of the world that built modern America, to reveal how this dirty industry town turned itself into a hi-tech 21st century metropolis. First, Don gets special access to the abandoned Carrie Blast Furnace, the last remaining building that was once a part of the 50,000-acre steel-making complex. Next, he travels on the Three Rivers of the Allegheny, the Monongahela, and the Ohio River and one of its many dam systems, called the Braddock Locks. Then he investigates the mythical tunnels of the Allegheny Arsenal, the once vital 30-acre stockpile that was possibly hiding a top-secret subterranean supply line for the Union Army. It also became the setting of the bloodiest civilian tragedy in the Civil War from "The Laboratory" (a munitions plant) gunpowder explosion that claimed 78 victims on September 17, 1862, the same day as the Battle of Antietam. Don then explores the mighty dome of the Civic Arena aka "The Igloo", the first retractable-roof arena in the world before its demolition date. Lastly, he scales the lowest level of the Fort Pitt Bridge, a part of the city's Golden Triangle, and checks out a robotics institute, Smith Hall of Carnegie Mellon University.
13	"Twin Cities"	November 20, 2011
Don explores the Twin Cities of Minneapolis and Saint Paul, Minnesota, revealing the secret past of these sibling cities and their hidden underworlds. First, he checks out the giant wreck of the 1880 Gold Medal Flour facility on the west bank of the Mississippi River in Minneapolis and subterranean remains its rival the Pillsbury's Best Flour mill built a year later on the east bank of the river in Saint Paul. Next he explores the gangster hangouts of Saint Paul (including the Lowry Hotel, and the Minnesota Club), and the Landmark Center, a former federal Building and post office that was an outpost of Federal agents called "G-Men" that put a stop to organized crime in the Roaring Twenties there. He then gets special access to the massive vaults that kept the First National Bank secure from bank robbers, and explores the huge silos of the old Schmidt's Brewery castle that was the first to abandon the natural cave system to embrace new technology to make beer. Don then goes inside the waterfall of St. Anthony Falls, an infrastructure that rebuilt the dam in Minneapolis. Lastly, he visits the innovative Hubert H. Humphrey Metrodome, home of the Minnesota Vikings, that was under construction after a blizzard ripped through its 27-year-old roof.

=== Season 2 (2012) ===
No.	Title	Original release date
14	"Making Gold, Escaping Alcatraz & Tunneling Under Grand Central"	April 17, 2012
In the second season premiere, host Don Wildman blasts and pours gold, visits Alcatraz in San Francisco to retrace the infamous June 11, 1962 escape route by inmates Frank Lee Morris and brothers John William and Clarence Anglin, learns how to make white-oak whiskey barrels at the Brown-Forman Cooperage in Louisville, Kentucky, gets a close-up look at the engineering marvel that is the "East Side Access Project" under Grand Central Terminal in New York City, and see what goes into designing a dog-surfing float in the 123rd Tournament of Roses Parade in Pasadena, California.
15	"Wrestling Gators, Flying the Good Year Blimp & Earthquake-Proofing San Francisco"	April 24, 2012
Wildman wrestles alligators at the Everglades Alligator Farm in Homestead, Florida, pilots the world-famous Goodyear Blimp in Wingfoot Lake, Ohio, learns how San Francisco prepares for "the big one" with seismic engineering at San Francisco City Hall close to the San Andreas Fault and Memorial Stadium at UC Berkeley that sits under the Hayward Fault, goes underground zip-lining in the 100-acre Mega Cavern, a former limestone quarry in Louisville, Kentucky, visits the New York Times printing plant in Queens, New York, and admires the space-age technological fabric roof on top of Denver International Airport in Denver, Colorado.
16	"Fighting Wildfires, Scaling Bridges & Making Snow"	May 1, 2012
Don Wildman learns how to fight "controlled burn" wildfires in Southern Florida; visits the headquarters of NORAD, an airforce station hidden inside the Cheyenne Mountain Complex in Colorado; makes man-made snow at Snow Summit ski resort in Big Bear Lake, California; disarms an IED or "roadside bombs" using a bomb disposal robot with the U.S. Army at the Picatinny Arsenal in Northern New Jersey; gets a behind-the-scenes look at the Times Square New Year's Eve Ball located inside the Times Square Building in Midtown Manhattan; and saves the burned-out Big Four Bridge in Louisville, Kentucky.
17	"Digging Under Manhattan, Climbing Coasters, & Training in Disaster City"	May 8, 2012
Wildman checks out the construction of a new subway tunnel on 2nd Avenue in New York City, works on a wooden and steel roller coaster with the maintenance crew at Cedar Point amusement park in Sandusky, Ohio, learns to make bourbon at the Jim Beam Distillery in Clermont, Kentucky, visits Texas Engineering Extension Service (TEEX) at their disaster training complex called "Disaster City" in College Station, Texas and helps them prepare for different natural disasters, and explores the eroding Herbert Hoover Dike on Lake Okeechobee in Southern Florida.
18	"Manning Nasa's Mars Rover, Stamping Out Coins & Taking Water From Toilet to Tap"	May 15, 2012
Wildman gets an inside look at the Bay Bridge Project when he scales the new Bay Bridge in San Francisco, California, visits the United States Mint in Denver, Colorado to see how millions of coins are made every day to ward off counterfeiters, sees how raw sugar is made into refined sugar at US Sugar Corporation, the largest sugar plant in the world located in Clewiston, Florida, rides a Mars rover that will one day be a part of an outpost on the Moon or Mars at the Johnson Space Center in Houston, Texas, learns how neon signs on the strip are designed at Yesco (Young Electric Sign Company) in Las Vegas, Nevada, and discovers how a waste water system turns raw sewage into 70 gallons of clean water in Orange County, California.
19	"Bobsled Racing, Automated Airport Baggage & Backstage Acrobatic Aquatic Show"	May 22, 2012
Wildman goes bobsledding in a 500-pound on a mile-long frozen sliding track at the Utah Olympic Park in Park City, Utah, operates a crane that assembles space shuttles in NASA's "Vehicle Assembly Building" (or V.A.B.) at the Kennedy Space Center in Cape Canaveral, Florida, checks out the cutting edge bag-handling system underneath the Denver International Airport in Denver, Colorado, scuba dives in a million-gallon underwater world from Le Rêve, an elaborate aquatic stunt show at the Wynn Hotel in Las Vegas, gets down n' dirty in America's second largest garbage dump at Puente Hills Landfill in Puente Hills, California, and helps restore Wolf Creek Dam, a man-made dam that provides flood control on the Cumberland River in Jamestown, Kentucky.
20	"Digging for Sea Salt; Demolishing a Bridge; Atop a Tramway"	June 5, 2012
Wildman rides and services an aerial tram at the Palm Springs Aerial Tramway in Palm Springs, California, learns how scrap metal is recycled with S.A. Recycling company at the Port of Long Beach in Long Beach, California, digs for sea salt 300 feet below ground in 6 miles of tunnels at the Redmond Salt Mine in Redmond, Utah, helps demolish the historic Route 1 Memorial Bridge in Portsmouth, New Hampshire, visits Plum Brook Station, a NASA testing grounds in Sandusky, Ohio, and clears out a pipe from the Pump House of the Monterey Bay Aquarium in Monterey, California.
21	"Atop the World's Largest Domed Stadium, Entertaining with Water, Fire and Ice & Crushing Concrete Roadways"	June 11, 2012
Wildman blasts through the streets of Ohio, climbs up the roof of the $1.1 billion, 3 million square foot Dallas Cowboys Stadium to check out the view of Arlington, Texas, learns how to shread discharded tires at a BAS tire recycling plant in Moreno Valley, California, discovers the process of how extravagant water displays are made on the campus of WET (Water, Entertainment, Technology) in Los Angeles, California, then gets a behind-the-scenes look at their creations in action in Las Vegas; first the water fountain show at the Bellagio, then the colorful ice fountain at CityCenter and then the volcanic fire show at The Mirage, sees what goes into designing a survival shelter in the Great Salt Lake in Utah, and helps with "PK crushing" concrete in Akron, Ohio.
22	"Launching a Rocket, Demolishing a Pier and Firing Rounds"	June 18, 2012
Wildman learns how firearms are made from different metals at Smith & Wesson in Springfield, Massachusetts, grooms an Olympic ski jump at Utah Olympic Park in Park City, Utah, witnesses a Delta IV rocket launch at Vandenberg Air Force Base in Lompoc, California, and helps reinforce a 70-year-old pier on Georges Island in Boston Harbor, and has an electrifying time with the world's original Van de Graaff generator at the Boston Museum of Science in Boston, Massachusetts.
23	"Navigating Rapids; Mucking Out Pig Stalls; Conquering a Rodeo"	July 15, 2012
Wildman cleans pig stalls in North Carolina, rides bulls in Texas and checks out a tunnel-boring machine in Miami, Florida.
24	"Blasting Granite, Bobbing for Logs, Training with the Pit Crew"	July 22, 2012
The host goes river bobbing for logs in South Carolina; trains with a pit crew in North Carolina; explores sea caves on the Carolina coast; and gets behind the controls of a Boeing 767.
25	"Drag Racing, Scaling Water Slides, and Logistics by UPS"	July 29, 2012
Don Wildman goes drag racing in North Carolina, scales a waterslide in Texas and sorts packages at a UPS facility in Louisville.
26	"Exploding Fireworks, Building Jet Engines, and Reconstructing the National Cathedral"	August 5, 2012
The host tests fireworks in California, helps build jet engines in North Carolina, and carves stone for the Washington National Cathedral.

=== Season 3 (2013) ===
No.	Title	Original release date
27	"High-Tech Adventures"	June 4, 2013
A futuristic array of luggage conveyors; a crewed rover designed for exploration of other planets.
28	"Man at Work"	June 4, 2013
Toughest work environments, including fighting fires, cleaning up waterways and repairing an Olympic venue.
29	"Amazing Engineering"	June 11, 2013
Grand Central Station in New York City; class four rapids; a port that ships out scrap metal.
30	"All-Access Adventure"	June 11, 2013
Gator wrestling; NASCAR pit crews; a Las Vegas show; the Goodyear Blimp.
