= Mysteries at the Monument =

American reality TV series

- Also known as: Monumental Mysteries
- Genre: Reality; Documentary
- Presented by: Don Wildman
- Narrated by: Don Wildman
- Country of origin: United States
- Original language: English
- No. of seasons: 3
- No. of episodes: 39

Production
- Executive producers: Dominic Stobart; Nicola Moody
- Producers: Edward Hambleton; Eve Rodrick
- Cinematography: Justin Lee Stanley
- Editors: Ed Kaz; Michael Wei; Margaret Noble; Mario Gonzalez; Michelle Kim; Rose Margolis; Athena Lemakis
- Camera setup: Multiple-camera
- Running time: 43 minutes
- Production company: Optomen Productions

Original release
- Network: Travel Channel
- Release: May 9, 2013 – February 11, 2016

Related
- Mysteries at the Museum; Mysteries at the Castle; Mysteries at the Hotel; Mysteries at the National Parks

Mysteries at the Monument (formerly Monumental Mysteries) is an American reality television series hosted by Don Wildman and airing on the Travel Channel. The show uncovers stories of history and unsolved mysteries behind America's national monuments. The series premiered on May 9, 2013, at 9:00 p.m. EST. The second season aired on June 13, 2014, at 9:00 p.m. EST. For Season 3, which premiered July 3, 2015, the series was renamed.

== Premise ==
Host Don Wildman travels the country for America's most amazing and unusual national monuments, uncovering the histories and mysteries hidden within. Each episode features a monument, historical marker, landmark, sculpture, or statue that has a special story or unique secret about them.

Opening Introduction: (narrated by Don Wildman):

Season 1-2:

Sometimes the greatest secrets lie in plain sight. These are "Monumental Mysteries".

Season 3:

Sometimes the greatest secrets lie in plain sight. These are "Mysteries at the Monument".

== Special (2012) ==
Note: Monumental Mysteries: A Mystery at the Museum Special aired on July 17, 2012, as a special episode as part of the related Travel Channel Mysteries at the Museum series. The special also served as a spin-off episode for the first-season premiere of Monumental Mysteries in 2013. It's also called Mysteries at the Museum: Monumental Mysteries Special.

No.	Title	Original release date
1	"Monumental Mysteries: A Mystery at the Museum Special"	July 17, 2012
Don investigates the tragic history of the Hollywood Sign when aspiring actress Peg Entwistle jumped off this world-famous landmark after her hopes and dreams were dashed by a failed film in 1932; visits the Statue of Liberty, where in 1916, this iconic American symbol was nearly obliterated by a seismic explosion from 2 million pounds of ammunition in a munitions plant on nearby Black Tom Island; examines the Georgia Guidestones in Elbert County, Georgia, a controversial monument of six granite stones etched with cryptic messages; learns the story behind a macabre memorial called "Black Aggie", a statue of a mournful veiled woman in a Washington, D.C. courtyard that was once believed to be possessed by an evil spirit that caused pregnant women to miscarry; discovers that when construction began in 1848, some viewed the Egyptian obelisk design of the Washington Monument as an emblem of evil of the New World Order; uncovers the mystery of a secret "Hall of Records" vault carved inside Mount Rushmore in South Dakota's Black Hills.

== Series overview ==
Season	Episodes	Originally released	
Season	Episodes	First released	Last released
1	13	May 9, 2013	August 8, 2013
2	13	June 13, 2014	September 5, 2014
3	13	July 3, 2015	September 25, 2015

== Episodes ==
=== Season 1 (2013) ===
No.	Title	Original release date
1.1	"Teen Vampire; King of Cons; First Escape From Alcatraz"	May 9, 2013
In the series premiere, host Don Wildman examines a tombstone linked to the Mercy Brown Vampire Incident at Chestnut Hill Baptist Church Cemetery in Exeter, Rhode Island; learns how con artist George C. Parker schemes off of New York City's landmarks—including selling Grant's Tomb; uncovers the first escape from Alcatraz, the infamous prison in San Francisco Bay by convicts Theodore Cole and Ralph Roe; discovers that the gold-leafed Statue of the Republic at Jackson Park in Chicago, Illinois is connected to the 1893 World's Fair murders by America's first serial killer, H.H. Holmes; investigates a UFO sighting by pilot Kenneth Arnold in Washington's Mount Rainier; and explores the theory that John Wilkes Booth escaped Ford's Theatre in Washington, D.C. after assassinating President Abraham Lincoln.
1.2	"Sickness of the Brooklyn Bridge; Day the Sky Fell Down; Gram Parsons Coffin Heist"	May 16, 2013
Don discovers the illness "caisson disease" workers suffered in underwater cassions during the construction of the Brooklyn Bridge; examines a marble sculpture in Sylacauga, Alabama called "Falling Star" that commemorates a meteorite that fell from the sky, striking housewife Ann Hodges in 1954; uncovers the plot to steal singer-songwriter Gram Parsons' body, who died near Joshua Tree National Park in California’s Mojave Desert; learns the legend of the Boll Weevil Monument in Enterprise, Alabama that pays tribute to an insect, the boll weevil that threatened the cotton industry; visits the James A. Garfield Memorial at Lake View Cemetery in Cleveland, Ohio, dedicated to President Garfield, who was assassinated in 1881; learns the story of the Loretto Chapel's spiral staircase, the "Miraculous Stair" in Santa Fe, New Mexico that was built by a mysterious carpenter.
1.3	"Smoky the Yorkie; Golden Gate Bridge; Oakville Blobs"	May 23, 2013
Don examines the mysterious substance of "clear blobs" raining from the skies at Capitol State Forest in Oakville, Washington; visits a war dog memorial in Cleveland Ohio's Metroparks dedicated to Smoky, a Yorkshire Terrier who became a hero in the Pacific War; learns how Harlem's Collyer Brothers Park got its name after compulsive hoarders who were killed by their own junk; investigates the tragic origins of constructing San Francisco's Golden Gate Bridge; explores Half Dome in California's Yosemite National Park, which was deemed inaccessible by foot until in 1875 when blacksmith George Anderson scaled to the summit by drilling spikes in its face; and uncovers the true story of the Gunfight at the O.K. Corral in Tombstone, Arizona when "The Cowboys" leader Johnny Ringo wasn't killed by Wyatt Earp after he was found dead outside town after fleeing the shootout.
1.4	"Grand Central Occult; Superhero Surfer; Charleston Jail"	May 30, 2013
Don uncovers sinister symbolism in the astronomical ceiling that may depict the Age of Aquarius of the Illuminati in New York City's Grand Central Terminal; examines the life of Hawaiian hero Duke Kahanamoku, known as the father of modern surfing through his bronze statue his hometown of Honolulu, Hawaii; investigates the haunted Old Charleston Jail in Charleston, South Carolina, where America's first female serial killer Lavinia Fisher was hanged; visits Showmen's Rest marked by a granite elephant at Woodlawn Cemetery in Forest Park, Illinois that's dedicated to the Hagenbeck-Wallace Circus showmen who lost their lives in the a train wreck in 1918; learns that London Bridge is really located in Lake Havasu City, Arizona; and explores Scotty's Castle in California's Death Valley National Park, once a token of an unusual friendship between a con man and a businessman.
1.5	"Chrysler Building; Stanford Mausoleum; Hedy Lamarr"	June 6, 2013
Don uncovers the Chrysler Building where a rivalry between architects William Van Alen and H. Craig Severance competed against each other to build the world's tallest building; investigates the Stanford Mausoleum at Stanford University in Stanford, California, which holds the remains of co-founder Jane Stanford, whose unnatural death is shrouded in mystery; examines a 2-foot statue in Sunol, California, a tribute to best-loved local—Bosco, a dog who was elected town mayor; explores the 60-foot Hindenburg disaster memorial at Lakehurst Naval Air Engineering Station in Lakehurst, New Jersey; learns how actress Hedy Lamarr earned her star on the Hollywood Walk of Fame when she came up with a secret commutation system for torpedoes to hit their mark during the Cold War; and visits the Grand Staircase in Escalante, Utah, where artist Everett Ruess disappeared.
1.6	"Ellis Island; Sailing Stones; Alamo Treasure"	June 13, 2013
Don examines the role that New York's Ellis Island played in the lives of the Trapp Family Singers who inspired the Sound of Music; learns how scientist Thomas Jaggar helped the residents of Hilo when the Mauna Loa in Hawaii Volcanoes National Park on The Big Island lava flow threatened the town; uncovers the strange story behind the labyrinth of rooms inside the Winchester Mystery House in San Jose, California; explores Arizona's Grand Canyon National Park that became the setting for an unsolved mystery when newlyweds Glen and Bessie Hyde disappeared while traveling down the dangerous Colorado River; discovers treasure hidden within the walls of The Alamo in San Antonio, Texas is possibly the reason why Jim Bowie and his militia defended the fortress; and investigates moving rocks called "sailing stones" on the Racetrack Playa in Death Valley National Park.
1.7	"The Real Rocky; Dr. Burdell; Kissing Sailor"	June 20, 2013
Don visits the Rocky Balboa statue at the Philadelphia Museum of Art, uncovering the real story behind the character through boxer Chuck Wepner, who inspired Sylvester Stallone to write Rocky; examines the tombstones of a murdered dentist and his mistress, Emma Cunningham, who are eternally linked in Brooklyn's Green-Wood Cemetery; investigates San Diego's "Unconditional Surrender" sculpture of the Alfred Eisenstaedt photo of a World War II sailor kissing a nurse; explores L.A.'s Elizabeth Lake ("Devils Lake") in Angeles National Forest, home of the Thunderbird, a 90-foot winged creature; discovers Hilo, Hawaii's town clock's hands are permanently frozen at 1:04 a.m. when a tsunami hit on May 22, 1960; and learns of the Nez Perce woman Watkuese, who saved Lewis and Clark's expedition, making it possible for the "Captain's Return" statue at St. Louis Arch's base.
1.8	"Sleeping Prophet; Mysterious Death of Mozart; the Real Poltergeist"	June 27, 2013
Don visits the grave site of mysticist Edgar Cayce, the "Sleeping Prophet" in the Riverside Cemetery in Hopkinsville, Kentucky, who had the gift of healing through hypnosis; looks into the mysterious death of Wolfgang Amadeus Mozart when viewing his bronze bust in Brooklyn's Prospect Park; explores Cheesman Park in Denver, Colorado, a city park centered around a pavilion that was built on top of a cemetery, making its hauntings the inspiration behind horror movie, Poltergeist; examines a stainless-steel monument on the Space Walk of Fame in Titusville, Florida that pays tribute to Gemini 8's emergency landing after a thruster malfunction; uncovers the role Niagara Falls played as a gateway to freedom for escaping slaves on the Underground Railroad; and learns about how woodsman Galen Clark saved California's Yosemite National Park from mining developers.
1.9	"American Venus; Alien Abduction; Buffalo Wings"	July 11, 2013
Don unveils the story of "American Venus" Audrey Munson through the connection of three statues in Manhattan's New York Public Library, Columbus Circle and the Municipal Building; visits Arizona's Sitgreaves National Forest where logger Travis Walton was allegedly abducted by a UFO; looks into the history of buffalo wings at the Anchor Bar in Buffalo, New York where a carved statue of its inventor, Teressa Bellissimo is located; explores South Dakota's Shadehill State Recreation Area, where a plague tells the tale of fur trapper Hugh Glass' survival from a grizzly bear attack; investigates the ghostly "face in the courthouse window" of a freed slave who was lynched at Pickens County Courthouse in Carrollton, Alabama; and uncovers the hoax of the Lake George Monster first discovered by Colonel William d'Alton Mann at Lake George in New York's Adirondack Park.
1.10	"Devil's Music; Fisherman's Wharf; Alaska Triangle Hale Boggs"	July 18, 2013
Don looks into the story behind Charles Dickens's statue at Clark Park in Philadelphia, Pennsylvania, dedicated to his "spirit pen" completing The Mystery of Edwin Drood; examines warrant fraud case by entrepreneur Henry Meiggs' loss on Meiggs Wharf of San Francisco's Fisherman's Wharf; learns about bluesman Robert Johnson's alleged deal with the devil through the "Crossroads Monument" at Highway 61 & 49 intersection in Clarksdale, Mississippi; investigates the unsolved disappearances of congressmen Hale Boggs and Nick Begich in Alaska's Chugach National Forest; visits "Taliesin" in Spring Green, Wisconsin, former home of Frank Lloyd Wright, which became the scene of a killing spree; explores Delta National Forest in Rolling Fork, Mississippi, the setting of how Theodore Roosevelt got his nickname "Teddy Bear" during a hunting trip with Holt Collier.
1.11	"First Circus Elephant; Greenbrier Ghost; Death of Captain Cook"	July 25, 2013
Don visits a memorial in Somers, New York to "Old Bet", the first circus elephant, which Hachaliah Bailey brought to the U.S. for the public to see; uncovers the legend of a woman's ghost that solved her murder, naming her "Greenbrier Ghost" on her headstone in a cemetery in Lewisburg, West Virginia; examines the James Cook statue in Waimea, Kauai that commemorates his discovery of the Hawaiian Islands; looks into the story behind the "Champ" monument, dedicated to the lake monster/sea serpent that inhabits Lake Champlain in Burlington, Vermont; explores Calvary Cemetery in Queens, New York where the elaborate tombstone of daredevil Steve Brodie, the first person to jump off the Brooklyn Bridge and survive; and investigates the survival story of Air Force Lt. David Steeves after his T-33 Trainer Jet exploded over California's Kings Canyon National Park.
1.12	"Eureka Springs Cancer Hotel; Female Paul Revere; Frozen Grandpa"	August 1, 2013
Don visits the Crescent Hotel in Eureka Springs, Arkansas, where swindler Norman Baker proposed a cure for cancer; examines a statue in Carmel, New York of Sybil Ludington, Colonel Henry Ludington's teenage daughter who became a Revolutionary War hero with her horsemanship, riding 40 miles to deliver a message; learns about a cryogenically frozen man whose body is stored in a shed in Nederland, Colorado; discovers a statue at the Edwards Air Force Base in Edwards, California that pays tribute to Chuck Yeager, who flew at the speed of sound; investigates the Pontalba Buildings in New Orleans, Louisiana, the oldest apartments in the U.S. and its designer Baroness Micaela Almonester Pontalba's life; and explores the Patriots Point Naval & Maritime Museum in Mount Pleasant, South Carolina, home of a memorial dedicated to the USS Scorpion disappearance.
1.13	"Ames Pyramid; Straus Titanic; Cracking the Zodiac"	August 9, 2013
Don learns the story behind the Ames Pyramid in Laramie, Wyoming, a symbol of a financial scandal involving the Ames Brothers during the First transcontinental railroad; visits Manhattan's Straus Park, where the "Memory" monument commemorates the love of Macy's co-owner Isidor Straus for his wife Ida Straus, who both died in the Titanic sinking; investigates California's Lake Berryessa island's link to the Zodiac Killer; examines Washington, D.C.'s Lincoln Memorial, where after banned at Constitution Hall, African-American vocalist Marian Anderson broke the racial barrier by performing in front of an integrated crowd in 1939; explores Castillo de San Marcos in St. Augustine, Florida, where lovers met their death after having an affair behind the fort commander's back; and visits Marfa, Texas, where a terra cotta viewing platform showcases the mysterious Marfa lights.

=== Season 2 (2014) ===
No.	Title	Original release date
2.1	"Lucy the Elephant; Capitol Bomber; Hitler in Hollywood"	June 13, 2014
Don Wildman visits Lucy the Elephant, an elephant-shaped building in Margate, New Jersey that once faced extinction from a wrecking ball; uncovers the story of German Nationalist Frank Holt, who bombed the United States Capitol in Washington, D.C. in 1915; learns of Jacque St. Germain, believed to be a vampire who lived in a house at the corner of Royal and Ursuline Streets in New Orleans, Louisiana; investigates the Oriental Saloon in Tombstone, Arizona where Casimir Zeglen, a young priest used Dr. George E. Goodfellow's journals to invent the bulletproof vest; explores Murphy Ranch in Rustic Canyon, Los Angeles, California, an abandoned bunker built for Silver Legion of America, a Nazi sympathizer cult; and discovers Dr. Charles Norris of the Manhattan Municipal Building in New York City is linked to Standard Oil's scandal involving Tetraethyllead poisoning.
2.2	"St. Urho; Mystery Castle; Bat Bombs"	June 20, 2014
Don learns about the truth behind a 14-foot statue of the fictitious patron saint of Finland, Saint Urho in Menahga, Minnesota; investigates the 1974 alien abduction of a hunter in Medicine Bow National Forest of Wyoming/Colorado; examines a double-sided plaque in Flint, Michigan that honors Sarah Emma Edmonds who served as a nurse in the Union Army as her secret persona, Franklin Thompson during the Civil War; checks out a bronze statue in Fort Smith, Arkansas of "The Invincible Marshall", Bass Reeves, a slave-turned U.S. Deputy Marshal; visits the Mystery Castle in Phoenix, Arizona, where a father suffering from tuberculosis made a promise to his daughter to build her a fairy tale castle; and shares the story of how bats residing in Carlsbad Caverns National Park in Carlsbad, New Mexico inspired a top secret weapon to turn bats into bombs during the Pacific War.
2.3	"Mike the Headless Chicken; the Mystery of Boon Island; Sister Aimee's Scandal"	June 27, 2014
Don examines a sculpture of a strange creature called "Mike the Headless Chicken" in Fruita, Colorado; explores Boon Island off the coast of Maine where a shipwreck occurred in 1710; learns about the Foshay Tower in Minneapolis, Minnesota, a building that was once linked to a nationwide financial scheme; visits a cave in Casper, Wyoming where, in 1932, prospectors found a pygmy known as the San Pedro Mountains mummy; uncovers a scandal involving celebrity evangelist Aimee Semple McPherson when she claimed she was kidnapped near Balboa Park in San Diego, California; and learns about the very first president of the United States, John Hanson at the county courthouse in Frederick, Maryland.
2.4	"Kidnapping the Sacred Cod; Baseball's Forgotten Hero; the Artichoke War"	July 4, 2014
Don investigates the Massachusetts State House in Boston, Massachusetts, where the 1933 fishy theft of the 1798 "Sacred Cod", a 5-foot long wood-carved cod; examines a historical marker in Toledo, Ohio of Moses Fleetwood Walker, the real first African-American baseball player—a catcher for the Toledo Blue Stockings in 1883; discovers the statue of New York City Mayor Fiorello La Guardia in Manhattan, New York, who took on the mob in the "artichoke wars"; discovers a possession of a girl known as the "Watseka Wonder" in the Roff Home in Watseka, Illinois; learns about a sculpture in New Orleans, Louisiana of jazz musician Buddy Bolden, a cornet player who descended into madness; and explores the Guadalupe-Nipomo Dunes in Southern California, where the lost Egyptian set from Cecil B. DeMille's The Ten Commandments is buried under sand.
2.5	"The Mystery of Captain Thunderbolt; Newsboy's Versus the World; the Rocket Man"	July 11, 2014
Don investigates the mysterious past of a highwayman-turned teacher who founded the Round Schoolhouse in Brookline, Vermont; discovers a commemorative plaque in New York City that honors the Newsboys Strike of 1899; explores Lake Crescent in Washington's Olympic National Park, which played a key role in bringing a murderer to justice; examines the statue of Frederick Douglass in Harlem, New York that uncovers his origins with a hoodoo root called "John the Conqueror" to ward off his master's beatings when he was a slave seeking freedom; learns about the life-sized bronze statue of famed physicist Robert H. Goddard in Roswell, New Mexico, who built the world's first liquid-propellant rocket; and visits the Great Sand Dunes National Park in San Luis Valley, Colorado, where a UFO sighting was connected to a horse mutilation.
2.6	"Kecksburg Space Acorn; Skyscraper Swindle; Emperor of the U.S."	July 18, 2014
Don examines an acorn-shaped sculpture that commemorates the UFO incident in Kecksburg, Pennsylvania on December 9, 1965; discovers a signpost in Martinsburg, West Virginia that marks the spot of the Belle Boyd Home, belonging to the famous Confederate spy who shot and killed a Union soldier; uncovers the story behind the world's littlest skyscraper in Wichita Falls, Texas that was once at the center of a fraudulent investment scheme during the oil boom; investigates the haunted Mission San Miguel Arcángel in Paso Robles, California which holds the horrors of a ghastly massacre that occurred during the gold rush; explores the San Francisco-Oakland Bay Bridge, an engineering wonder inspired by eccentric emperor of the U.S. Joshua Norton; and uncovers the story behind a statue of Japanese diplomat Chiune Sugihara in Little Tokyo, Los Angeles, California.
2.7	"The King and the Spanish Dancer; a Communist Comes to America; Filth Party"	July 25, 2014
Don investigates the cottage of Lola Montez, a Spanish dancer who lived in Grass Valley, California and had an affair with Ludwig I of Bavaria, which cost him his throne; examines a plague at the University of Wisconsin–Madison College of Agriculture and Life Sciences in Madison, Wisconsin dedicated to Dr. Joseph Goldberger, who used himself as a lab rat to study a Pellagra epidemic in 1914; visits a 16-foot controversial statue of Vladimir Lenin, in the Fremont neighborhood of Seattle, Washington; uncovers the truth behind the UFO incident at Hart Canyon in Aztec, New Mexico; learns about a bronze statue of Nikola Tesla that is a tribute to his part in the invention of radio in Shoreham, New York on Long Island; and explores Lake Tahoe in the Sierra Nevada, where sightings of a 17-foot serpentine creature called "Tahoe Tessie" have been reported since the 1950s.
2.8	"Superman vs. the KKK; Who Killed Huey Long?; Marches to Montgomery"	August 1, 2014
Don learns how author Stetson Kennedy infiltrated the Ku Klux Klan on Georgia's Stone Mountain by going undercover and exposing them through the Superman radio show; visits the statue of U.S. Senator Huey Long, who was mysteriously assassinated in front of the State Capitol in Baton Rouge, Louisiana; investigates a UFO sighting witnessed by the Ground Observer Corps over South Dakota's Black Hills National Forest, spearheading Project Blue Book; examines the Edmund Pettus Bridge in Selma, Alabama, the site of "Bloody Sunday", the 1965 attack on civil rights activists while marching from Selma to Montgomery; uncovers the Murder in Coweta County trial at Coweta County Courthouse in Newnan, Georgia involving famed fortune-teller Mayhayley Lancaster; and discovers a monument in Dallas, Texas dedicated to Longhorns having the cure of Texas cattle fever.
2.9	"The Reanimator; Florida Three Toes; the Man Who Invented Martians"	August 9, 2014
Don discovers the story of real-life Dr. Frankenstein, Robert E. Cornish trying to resurrect the dead at the University of California at Berkeley; investigates the giant penguin hoax when witnesses spotted three-toed footprints on the beaches at Florida's Honeymoon Island State Park; explores Sybil's Cave in Hoboken, New Jersey that was tied an unsolved celebrity murder of Mary Rogers, a beautiful cigar girl, who was killed nearby; uncovers the criminal case of the "Barefoot Bandit", teenage outlaw Colton Harris-Moore who hid out in Turtleback Mountain Preserve on Washington states's San Juan Island; examines the work of Dr. Oliver Sacks at Manhattan's New York Academy of Medicine that was the focal point of "sleepy sickness"; and visits the Lowell Observatory in Flagstaff, Arizona, named after astronomer Percival Lowell who claimed there are Martian canals on Mars.
2.10	"Blind Tom; Invention of the Tommy Gun; Granddaddy of Snowboarding"	August 15, 2014
Don visits slave-turned-pianist Blind Tom Wiggins's grave at Evergreens Cemetery in Brooklyn, New York, whose musical prowess led to a custody battle; visits army officer John T. Thompson's birthplace, the inventor of the Tommy gun; examines the statue of aviation pioneer Jackie Cochran in Neillsville, Wisconsin, who served in the Women Airforce Service Pilots (W.A.S.P.'s) during World War II; investigates the Lining House in Charleston, South Carolina, where Dr. William Trott opened up an apothecary, luring customers in with seeing a live "mermaid" gimmick; discovers snowboarding's origins with "The Turning Point" monument in Muskegon, Michigan when engineer Sherm Poppen invents the "snurfer", giving way for Jake Burton Carpenter's redesign—the snowboard; and learns the legend of teenage lawman Elfego Baca through his sculpture in Reserve, New Mexico.
2.11	"Escape From Slavery; A Witch on Hatteras Island; The Horn That Made a Big Bang"	August 22, 2014
Don visits the Lewis and Harriet Hayden House in Boston, Massachusetts that's connected to the most daring escape from slavery by Ellen and William Craft; examines the "Cora Tree", a majestic oak tree's connection to witchcraft while on Hatteras Island, North Carolina; discovers how the Holmdel Horn Antenna in Holmdel, New Jersey changed people's understanding of life's origins with the Big Bang theory; discovers a gravestone linked to the murders of nursing home owner, Amy Archer-Gilligan at Hillside Cemetery in Cheshire, Connecticut; investigates the mystery of "Old Rip", a horned toad that survived 31 years sealed in Eastland County Courthouse's cornerstone in Eastland, Texas; and explores Mount Lemmon in Tucson, Arizona, where Wilhelm Reich claims the site has cosmic forces he calls "orgone energy" and experiments with his rain-inducing device, "Cloudbuster".
2.12	"The House That Sugar Built; Kill Dozer; Rocking Chair Riots"	August 29, 2014
Don learns about local welder Marvin Heemeyer, who went on a bulldozer rampage after losing a zoning dispute, damaging the Granby Town Hall in Granby, Colorado; uncovers the story of the 1901 "rocking chair" riot that took place in New York City's Central Park; investigates the "Philadelphia Experiment", an alleged cloaking device that was put aboard the U.S.S. Eldridge at Philadelphia's Navy Yard; visits the Hack House in Milan, Michigan, once at the center of a sugar swindle when owner Henry Friend claimed to refine sugar with his electric refining machine; examines a monument in Cherry, Illinois that pays tribute to the 1909 Cherry Mine disaster, a coal mining fire where 259 men perished from "black damp"; and explores the moonlight towers in Austin, Texas are linked to a crime spree of the Servant Girl Annihilator, a Malay cook/serial killer who only murdered women.
2.13	"Roosevelt's Moroccan Mission; The Last Bare Knuckle Boxer; America's First Spy Ring"	September 5, 2014
Don explores the link between Philadelphia's U.S.S. Olympia and the Morocco political scandal involving Theodore Roosevelt, the Perdicaris incident; uncovers the story how one cop exposed a con-artist fortuneteller as he worked the case in New York City's former Police Headquarters Building; examines a historic marker in Hattiesburg, Mississippi that marks the spot of the last bare-knuckle boxing prize fight between John L. Sullivan and Jake Kilrain in 1889; discovers the mystery of a salvaged submarine found by a diver underneath Chicago's Lyric Opera/Madison Street Bridge; visits the house of Major Benjamin Tallmadge in Litchfield, Connecticut, the master of America's first spy ring that changed the course of the Revolutionary War; and investigates a UFO hoax from a memorial plaque that replaced a stolen "alien" tombstone in Aurora Cemetery in Aurora, Texas.

=== Season 3 (2015) ===
No.	Title	Original release date	Original U.S. viewers
3.1	"Destiny Stone; Niagara Falls; Madness of Mary Todd"	July 3, 2015	534,000
Don visits the famous London church, Westminster Abbey that set the stage for an audacious heist when Scottish Nationalist Ian Hamilton stole the Stone of Destiny; examines the story behind the Thomas Edison bust in West Orange, New Jersey and who invented motion pictures, Edison or French inventor Louis Le Prince; learns the Washington Monument in Washington, D.C. became a site to a standoff on December 8, 1982 when nine tourists were held hostage by nuclear bomb activist, Norman Mayer, who parked a dynamite-packed truck nearby; discovers the natural wonder of Niagara Falls, Mother Nature threatened to shut down in 1965; investigates Bellevue Place in Batavia, Illinois, an insane asylum that once housed first lady Mary Todd Lincoln, who was wrongfully incarcerated, but was freed by lawyer Myra Bradwell; and uncovers the history of potato chipss when chef George Crum cooked up the first batch for Cornelius Vanderbilt at Moon's Lake House in Saratoga Springs, New York in 1853.
3.2	"Freedom Balloon; First Film Star; Freud's Therapy Dog"	July 10, 2015	520,000
Don visits the East Side Gallery in Berlin, Germany, a reminder of the daring escape of two families from Poessneck, East Germany who risked a flight to freedom in a homemade hot air balloon in 1979; uncovers the story behind IMP founder Carl Laemmle's star on the Hollywood Walk of Fame when he started the 1910 publicity stunt of actress Florence Lawrence's "death" to lure her away from Biograph Studios; investigates Hancock Point near Bar Harbor, Maine, once the gateway to Nazi spy Erich Gimpel and defector William Colepaugh's plan to destroy America’s atomic bomb on Manhattan Project sites during World War II; examines the statue of Austrian neurologist Sigmund Freud at Clark University in Worcester, Massachusetts, whose Chow Chow Jofi, helped him hypothesize the psychological benefits of K-9 companions; returns to The Alamo in San Antonio, Texas where in 1908, after ranch heiress Clara Driscoll plan to demolish the Long Barracks, school teacher Adina De Zavala holds her own standoff to preserve the fort’s history; and explores Wall Street in Manhattan's Financial District, once the scene of a political bombing by Italian Anarchist Mario Buda in 1920.
3.3	"Harlem Hellfighters; Resurrected Jockey; Invention of Braille"	July 17, 2015	596,000
Don visits the Excelsior Brigade Monument at Gettysburg National Military Park in Gettysburg, Pennsylvania, a tribute to the 71st Infantry's general, Daniel Sickles who was the first to plead temporary insanity when he shot his friend Philip Barton Key after he had an affair with his wife Teresa; uncovers the story behind jockey Ralph Neves' resurrection after being thrown off his horse and declared dead at Santa Anita Park in Arcadia, California in 1936; learns about Louis Braille, the inventor of Braille whose tomb is inside the Panthéon in the Latin Quarter of Paris, France; explores Wyoming's Devils Tower, where Close Encounters of the Third Kind was filmed inspired by J. Allen Hynek, an astronomer who debunked UFO cases in Project Blue Book for the Air Force stated that scientists should research sightings instead of dismiss them, classifying the term "close encounters"; discovers a memorial of the 369th Infantry Regiment in Harlem, New York dedicated to African-American World War I heroes who battled in the Meuse-Argonne Offensive with the French Army; and investigates the Thread City Crossing (a.k.a. "The Frog Bridge") in Windham, Connecticut adorned with 8-foot bronze frogs atop concrete thread spools, dedicated to the battling bullfrogs' nocturnal noise fight for the only water source in a mill pond during a drought in 1754.
3.4	"Savior of the Squalus; Man Who Saved Pisa; Candy Bomber"	July 24, 2015	610,000
Don uncovers the history of the William Shakespeare statue in New York City's Central Park when in 1890, to honor his hero, naturalist Eugene Schieffelin brings birds from his writings, including 60 starlings his releases, but they soon blanket the continent causing the crash of Eastern Air Lines Flight 375 in 1960; examines the ingenuity behind Italy's Leaning Tower of Pisa, which was on the brink of collapse if it wasn't for British professor John Burland's engineering in 1999; explores the USS Squalus Memorial at Portsmouth Navy Yard in Portsmouth, New Hampshire, where in 1939, a crew of 59 sailors are in danger when a "crash dive" flooded the submarine, but 33 are rescued by Lt. Commander Charles Momsen's diving bell, the "Momsen lung"; visits the Welcome to Fabulous Las Vegas sign in Las Vegas, Nevada, home of the longest running scheme in Sin City history when TV repairman Tommy Carmichael creates the "monkey paw" device to cheat slot machines; investigates Tempelhofer Freiheit Park in Berlin, Germany, a former airport that U.S. Army Air Forces pilot Gail Halvorsen launched a "sweet" mission that won the hearts of West Berliners during the blockade in 1948; and examines the Atlantic Atlantic Intracoastal Waterway that were once at the center of a string of heists by cat burglar Bill Mason.
3.5	"Pretender Prince; The Lunch That Changed America; The Lie Factory"	July 31, 2015	474,000
Don tours the Tower of London in Tower Hamlets, London that imprisoned Margaret of York's princely nephews, Edward and Richard, inspiring imposter Perkin Warbeck to claim the English throne; examines the desegregation sculpture honoring a scene from the 1958 Dockum Drug Store sit-in lunch counter in Wichita, Kansas; visits Owls Head Light in Rockland, Maine, once the scene of bizarre tale of a frozen couple who defrosted after a shipwreck in 1850; examines the statue of frontierswoman Angelina Eberly in Austin, Texas, who changed the course of the state's history with one heroic fire of her cannon when Sam Houston ordered his rangers to remove national archives in 1842; uncovers the story behind the Upton Sinclair House in Monrovia, California, where the novelist was the target of a smear campaign when he ran for governor in 1934; investigates a tombstone enclosed in a glass viewing box at Third Creek Presbyterian Church and Cemetery in Cleveland, North Carolina that is believed to be of French commander, Marshal Michel Ney who served in Napoleon's army and was living under the false name Peter Stuart Ney as the town's schoolteacher.
3.6	"The Real Q; Alibi Clock; Sasquatch in a Shell"	August 7, 2015	490,000
Don uncovers MI6 spy stories of device maker Charles Fraser-Smith at the SIS Building in London's South Bank, inspiring Q from the James Bond films; examines an ornate street clock in Vallejo, California that played a part in the Preparedness Movement when a bomb exploded during a parade in 1916; learns the legend of a turtle statue that pays tribute to the "Beast of Busco", a giant alligator snapping turtle that mystified the residents of Churubusco, Indiana in 1949; visits the Royal Hawaiian Hotel in Waikiki Beach Oahu, Hawaii, that was at the center of a 1962 hoax when local con-man Sammy Amalu tricked the owners into closing a property deal; investigates the supernatural story behind the Union General George B. McClellan statue in Washington, D.C. that turned the tide of the Civil War when George Washington's ghost showed him the enemy's battle plan; and explores Greenwich Village's Stonewall Inn where in 1969 gay rights activist Craig Rodwell instigated riots, starting the gay liberation movement.
3.7	"Piggy Bank; All the Kings Horses; Funeral to Freedom"	August 14, 2015	N/A
Don examines a plaque that pays tribute to a boy named Wilbur Chapman who raised enough money for leprosy by selling his pig Pete, starting the piggy bank movement in White Cloud, Kansas; learns the story behind a Sharon, Massachusetts statue of Deborah Sampson, who in 1782, disguised herself as a man to fight in the Revolutionary War; uncovers the history of Wesleyan Cemetery in Cincinnati, Ohio when it played a pivotal role in "The Escape of the 28" fugitive slaves' journey to freedom; investigates California's Edwards Air Force Base in the Mohave Desert, which gave rise to CIA agent Richard Bissell's top-secret operation of the Corona spy satellite that changed the face of the Cold War; visits the MacMillan Building in Greenwich Village, New York City, home of Forbes Magazine and where company journalist Adam Penenberg uncovered a scandal that brought down the industry's rising star Stephen Glass and his fictional stories; and explores St. Mary-at-the-Walls, built around a medieval tower in Colchester, England, the scene of a siege during the Second English Civil War, allegedly inspiring a beloved children's verse from the nursery rhyme, Humpty Dumpty.
3.8	"Pickles Saves the World Cup; Strowder Switch; Rebel Hope"	August 21, 2015	N/A
Don learns the story behind the Champions statue in West Ham, London, England that memorializes West Ham United players in the 1966 World Cup and how the Jules Rimet Trophy was stolen then found by a dog named Pickles; tours the Greenwood Cemetery in St. Petersburg, Florida, where the memory marker of Almon Strowger, an undertaker who changed the face of communications technology with the automatic telephone exchange system; examines General George S. Patton statue in Chiriaco Summit, California and his role in taking the biblical weapon, The Spear of Destiny; visits Manassas National Battlefield Park in Manassas, Virginia, where the Union army suffered defeat at the Battle of Bull Run, due to the Southern spy Rose Greenhow, who forever changed the length of the Civil War; investigates the roadside mural in Socorro, New Mexico that remembers the 1964 UFO incident, when police officer Lonnie Zamora saw a flying saucer in the night sky and two small beings; and explores the Presidents House in Philadelphia, Pennsylvania, a memorial built on the city's first Executive Mansion that pays tribute to George Washington's enslaved servant, Oney Judge, who escaped the president for freedom.
3.9	"Black Magic Rocket Scientist; Broadway Baby and the Tobacco Heir; Disaster on Everest"	August 28, 2015	N/A
Don explores Devil's Gate Dam in Pasadena, California, where rocket scientist Jack Parsons performed black magic rituals leading up to his mysterious death; tours the Rockingham County Courthouse in Rockingham County, North Carolina, which once witnessed the shocking 1932 murder of young R.J. Tobacco heir Smith Reynolds and his celebrity wife Libby Holman; visits Crissy Field in San Francisco, California, a former Air Service base where Navy Commander John Rodgers flew the first sea plane (PN-9) in 1925 during his death-defying quest to change aviation history; discovers the grave of graphic designer Harvey Ball at the Notre Dame Cemetery in Worcester, Massachusetts, famous for launching a campaign to boost morale with his smiley face icon; learns the true story of one of the most devastating disasters in mountaineering history on Mount Everest, the 1996 summit attempt that left two climbers at odds; and examines a statue in Seneca Falls, New York honoring feminist Amelia Bloomer's 1851 invention of bloomers.
3.10	"Stockholm Syndrome; Soviet Who Saved the World; Barbara Rose"	September 4, 2015	N/A
Don discovers Norrmalmstorg plaza in Stockholm, Sweden was at the center of a 1973 bank robbery by criminals Jan-Erik Olsson and Clark Olofsson that coined the psychological term "Stockholm Syndrome"; examines a "A World on the Edge" monument in Boynton Beach, Florida, honoring Russian naval commander Vasili Arkhipov, who saved the world from nuclear war during the Cuban Missile Crisis; explores Iolani Palace in Honolulu, Oahu, where in 1961, clothing vendor Bill Foster lobbied for state reps to wear his "Aloha shirts" to dress casual on Fridays; learns the story of Farmville civil rights activist Barbara Rose Johns monument in Richmond, Virginia, who fought for desegregation in all public schools; visits the Old Avon Railroad Station in Avon, New York, linked to architect Bradford Lee Gilbert's Tower Building, the first skyscraper; looks at a plaque in Nevada City, Montana, recalling the George Ives trial/hanging and how Montana Vigilantes stopped the 1863 stagecoach robberies of sheriff-turned-outlaw Henry Plummer and his bandit gang.
3.11	"Gunpowder Plot; Lost in Yellowstone; Cops Are Robbers"	September 11, 2015	N/A
Don tours the Houses of Parliament in London, England, where Guy Fawkes planned to blow it up during the Gunpowder Plot of 1605; visits U.S. senator Key Pittman's memorial at Mountain View Cemetery in Reno, Nevada, whose body was kept on ice in a hotel bathtub until he was reelected in the 1940 elections; discovers an old Depositors Trust night deposit box in Medford, Massachusetts, once connected to the 1980 bank robbery by corrupt cops; visits Omaha Beach in Normandy, France, where Allies fooled the Nazis in Operation Fortitude when double agent Juan Pujol García misinformed them about invading Pas de Calais during World War II; learns the story of the Declaration of Independence through the Captain James Jack statue in Charlotte, North Carolina, when he witnessed a Mecklenburg statesman pen the document one year before, known as the Mecklenburg Declaration of Independence; explores Mount Everts, where Truman Everts' 1870 survival story during the Washburn Expedition inspired Yellowstone National Park in Wyoming.
3.12	"The Disaster That Saved London; The Man in the Green Hat; The Viking Mailman"	September 18, 2015	N/A
Don visits the neoclassical Monument in London, England that commemorates the Great Fire of London in 1666 when it saved the city from the bubonic plague; tours the U.S. Capitol Building in Washington, D.C., where bootlegger George Cassiday exposed hypocrisy by selling hooch to Congressmen during Prohibition; examines pioneer John "Snowshoe" Thompson's statue in Genoa, Nevada, who introduced skiing to the American West after using his skis to rescue trader James Sisson in 1856; explores the Old Spanish Fort ruins in New Orleans, Louisiana, once the setting for swindler James C. Wingard's "Nameless Force" weapon demonstration/hoax in 1876; learns the story behind the George Washington Equestrian Statue in Williamsburg, Brooklyn, when prisoner Isaac Ketcham saved the future president by overhearing Commander-in-Chief's Guard Thomas Hickey's assassination plot in England; and discovers Magic Island on Oahu once witnessed anthropologist Ben Finney's 1976 epic 34 day voyage in a Polynesian canoe, Hokulea.
3.13	"Lady Godiva & the Peeping Tom; Bishop's Brain; Birds of a Feather"	September 25, 2015	N/A
Don discovers the truth behind mentalist Washington Irving Bishop's gravestone in Brooklyn's Green-Wood Cemetery, whose rare gift and his catalepsy led to his demise while performing at the Lambs Club in 1889; examines the Lady Godiva statue in Coventry, England that pays tribute to her naked ride to oppose taxation in 1040; explores the Florida's Everglades National Park, where socialite/birder Harriet Hemenway saves fledglings from extinction with a plume trade ban for fashion; visits the Kennebec County Courthouse in Augusta, Maine that hosted a case of the "North Pond Hermit", whose 1,000 burglaries of campers starting in 1986 was caught 27 years later; learns the story of blackjack player Keith Taft and son Marty through the Reno Arch in Reno, Nevada, who invented a card-counting eyeglass device to aid advantage play; investigates the Warsaw Ghetto boundary wall in Warsaw, Poland, once a part of the largest Jewish ghetto in Nazi-occupied Europe and a freedom portal when social worker Irena Sendler aided them in their escape.
