= Abraham Warner =

American businessman

Abraham "Old Abe" Warner (circa 1814-1896) was an eccentric shop owner in the nineteenth century, in New York and San Francisco. Abraham Warner was fond of children, animals, art, and his collection of various items.

He was superstitious about or perhaps admired spiders, as he refused to kill them or to disrupt their webs. Despite this, he kept himself tidy and well groomed. The most commonly ordered drink at his bar was a gin and whisky hot toddy with cloves, but he refused to sell whisky straight. He also made free chowder and sold locally made French bread alongside French and Spanish drinks, and seafood.

== Life ==
Abe Warner was born in New York City, New York, between 1814 and 1817. He was first employed as a butcher in Fulton Market, and later, in 1849, on San Francisco's Long Wharf. It was during this job that he gained his notable top hat. In 1856, Warner bought a restaurant at the foot of Meiggs Wharf and renamed it the Cobweb Palace. He sold the Palace in an auction in 1893 and died in 1896. His bedroom upon death contained a cockatoo which had died days before, a Louis XIV bed, and a younger portrait of himself.

== See also ==
- Meiggs Wharf
- The Cobweb Palace
