= The Cobweb Palace =

Coordinates: 37.809141°N 122.413668°W

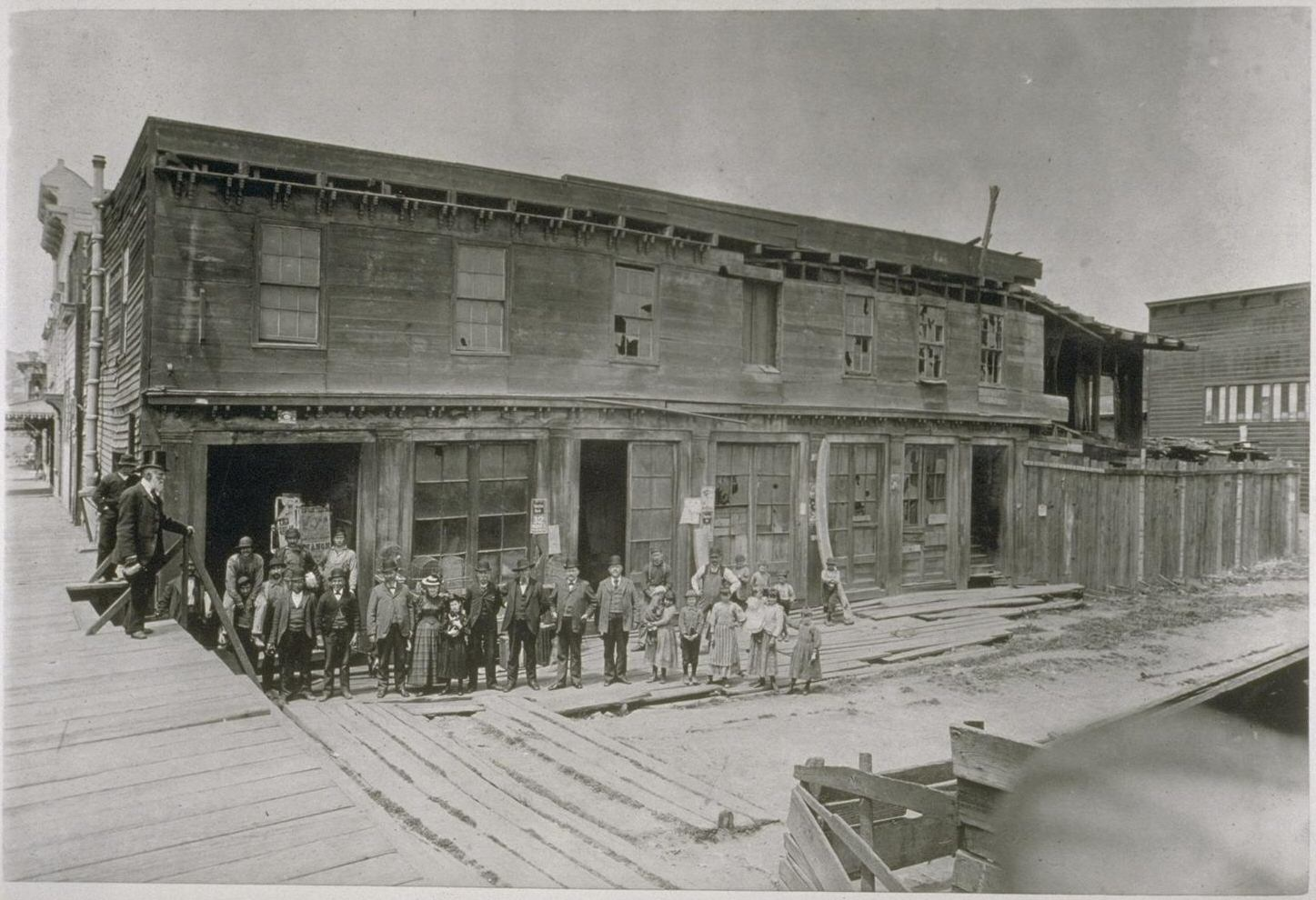
- Abe Warner's Cobweb Palace. Francisco Street. Abe Warner in plug hat on the left.
- Interactive map of The Cobweb Palace

Restaurant information
- Established: 1856
- Closed: 1897
- Previous owner: Abraham Warner
- Location: 2200 Powell Street, San Francisco, California, USA

The Cobweb Palace was a popular saloon and restaurant at Meiggs Wharf in San Francisco, California during and after the Gold Rush. It was run by eccentric "Old Abe" Warner, who traded drinks for exotic pets, curios, and pieces of scrimshaw as well as money. An old, physically disabled sailor sold peanuts outside. The Palace was popular with seafarers, tourists, and locals alike. Old Abe's menu included free chowder, seafood, alcohol, and local French bread, but not straight whisky, which he thought of as a lesser drink. There was a shooting gallery, and the bar was a few steps below the sidewalk.

Mark Twain may have visited the place.

== History ==
The Cobweb Palace was opened at the foot of Meiggs Wharf, on the intersection of Francisco, Mason, and Powell Streets in 1856 after the Meiggses had left and the wharf was ownerless. Abe served patrons of all classes. The bar was named the Cobweb Palace because Warner, who refused to kill spiders, left strands of their webs everywhere. His bar's entrance was flanked by two Alaskan totem poles. Warner sold the bar in 1893, and died in 1896 at the age of eighty to eighty two. The bar closed due to competing amusements and changes in the North Beach neighborhood. The location is now a post office and restaurant.

== Collection ==
Warner's collection included live bears, kangaroos, parrots, cats, dogs, bats, and monkeys, among other animals. He also collected weapons, scrimshaw, totem poles, old coins, quartz, taxidermy, Noh masks, thousands of paintings, and other treasures. One parrot of his was named Warner Grandfather and could swear in four languages, as well as order a "rum and gum." He spent very little feeding his animals due to their eating leftovers and stealing peanuts from the peanut vendor who sat outside. Everything was covered in dust and cobwebs, but Abe himself was neatly groomed. Charles Warren Stoddard compared the state of the bar to a witch's home and spoke of its musty smell.

Some of the scrimshaw is now located at Mystic Seaport in Mystic, Connecticut.

== In popular culture ==
Both Abe and his Palace are mentioned throughout the book The Doctor's Newfound Family by Valerie Hansen. It is also included in issue number 31 of Sandman comics by Neil Gaiman. The Cobweb Palace and its clients and proprietor are also featured in Sunset Specters by Gary Jonas.

== See also ==
- Abraham Warner
- Meiggs Wharf
