= Jabe Pond =

- Location within New York Jabe Pond (the United States)
- Location: Warren County, New York, United States
- Coordinates: 43°42′15″N 73°32′18″W
- Type: Lake
- Basin countries: United States
- Surface area: 146 acres (0.59 km^{2})
- Average depth: 31 feet (9.4 m)
- Max. depth: 66 feet (20 m)
- Shore length^{1}: 3 miles (4.8 km)
- Surface elevation: 1,312 feet (400 m)
- Islands: 8
- Settlements: Silver Bay, New York
- ^{1} Shore length is not a well-defined measure.

Jabe Pond is a lake located west of Silver Bay, New York. Fish species present in the lake are brook trout, rainbow smelt, brown trout, rainbow trout, and brown bullhead. There is a carry down trail on the north shore via a dirt road from Silver Bay. No motors are allowed on this lake.

As of 2019-08-26 Google Maps has incorrect directions to the hiking trail head at Jabe Pond. From the south, take Split Rock road, not Terrace road (which crosses private property).
