= Hague, New York =

Hague
- Town
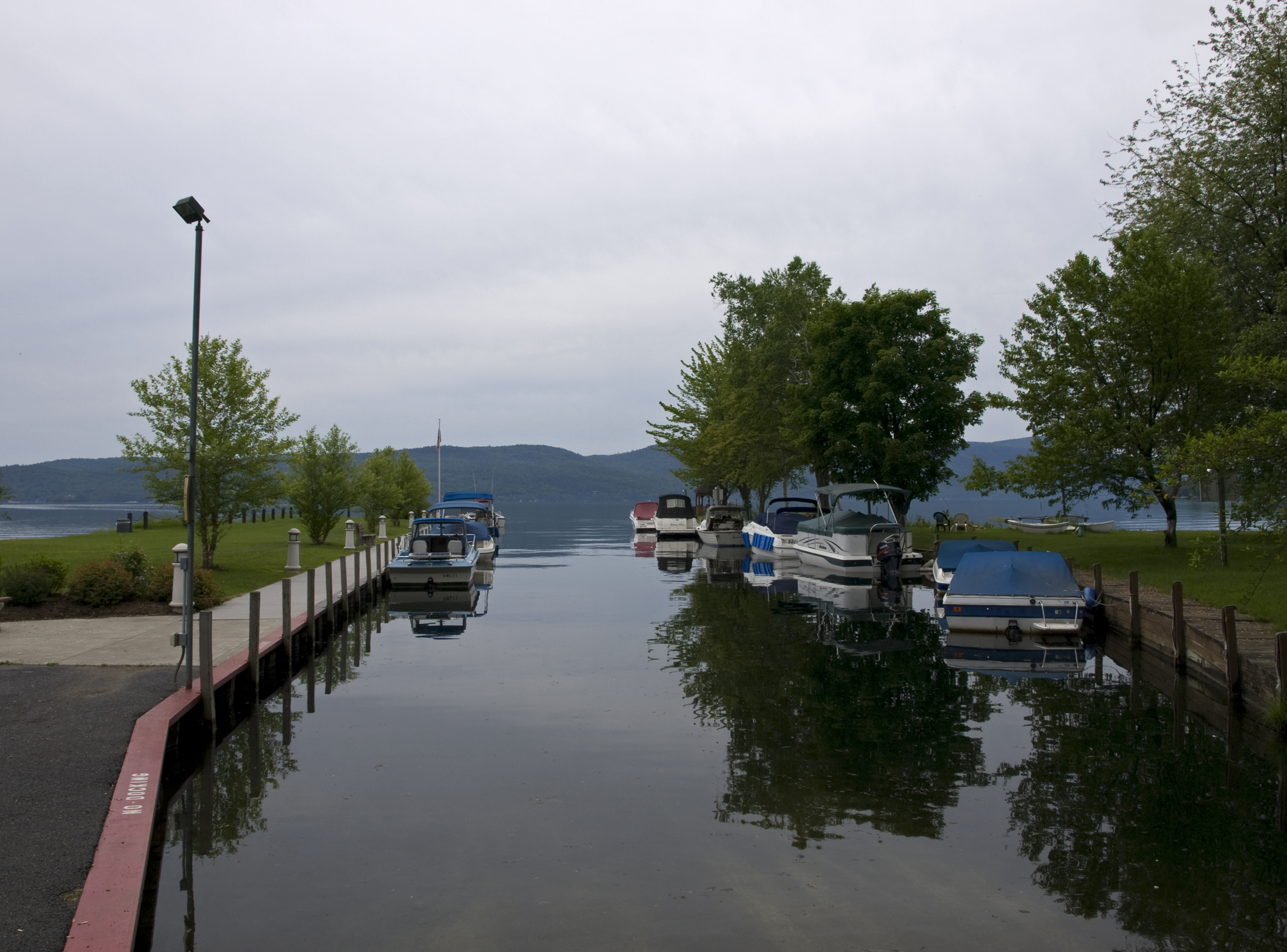
- Boat landing with Lake George in the background

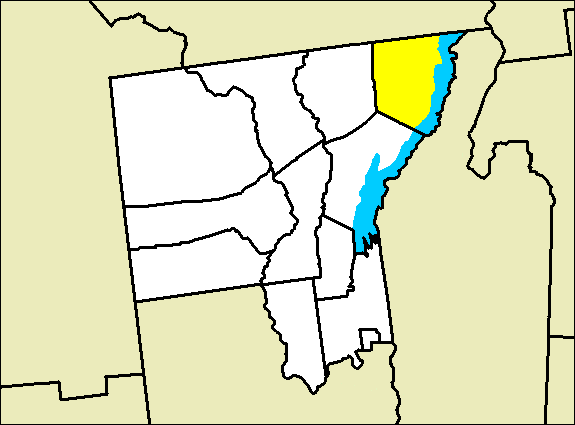
- Location of Hague in Warren County

- Location within the state of New York
- Coordinates: 43°44′8″N 73°31′16″W
- Country: United States
- State: New York
- County: Warren

Area
  - Total: 79.62 sq mi (206.21 km^{2})
  - Land: 63.76 sq mi (165.14 km^{2})
  - Water: 15.86 sq mi (41.07 km^{2})
- Elevation: 1,391 ft (424 m)

Population (2010)
  - Total: 699
  - Estimate (2016): 684
  - Density: 10.7/sq mi (4.14/km^{2})
- Time zone: UTC-5 (Eastern (EST))
  - Summer (DST): UTC-4 (EDT)
- ZIP code: 12836
- Area code: 518
- FIPS code: 36-31335
- GNIS feature ID: 0979033

Hague is a town in northeastern Warren County, New York, United States located on the scenic Lake George. It is part of the Glens Falls Metropolitan Statistical Area. The population was 854 at the 2000 census. The town was named after the city The Hague in the Netherlands.

== History ==
In 1757, during the French and Indian War, Sabbath Day Point was used as an encampment and staging area for the French Army and nearly two thousand Odawa in an expedition to capture the British Fort William Henry at the southern end of Lake George. While at the Sabbath Day Point camp, they conducted an ambush of a group of British soldiers and captured many. Later at the Sabbath Day Point base camp, the Indians cannibalized some of the captured British prisoners.

Sabbath Day Point was used a landing place in 1758 for British armies en route to attack the French at Fort Carillion and again in 1759 when General Jeffery Amherst finally succeeded in capturing Fort Carillon. It was then renamed Fort Ticonderoga.

During the American Revolution, Benjamin Franklin twice encamped there traveling to and from Canada as an emissary of the Continental Congress in an unsuccessful attempt to have Canada join the Colonies in the revolution. He was Postmaster General and in this capacity, he conducted temporary postal processing functions on each of his stays at Sabbath Day Point.

The town was first settled around 1796. The Town of Hague was originally part of the Town of Bolton and was created in 1807 as the Town of Rochester. In 1808 it changed its name to Hague.

In 1904 the waters of Hague bay were home of the Lake George Monster. The "monster" was the creation of Harry Watrous, and was part of a practical joke.

== Geography ==
According to the United States Census Bureau, the town has a total area of 79.6 square miles (206 km^{2}), of which 64.0 square miles (166 km^{2}) is land and 15.6 square miles (40 km^{2}) (19.58%) is water.

New York State Route 8 ends at Route 9N, which joins the lakeside communities on the eastern side of the town.

The eastern town line is the border of Washington County. The town and county include the surface of Lake George so that only the opposite shore is part of Washington County. The northern town boundary is the border of Essex County.

== The Hague Chronicle ==
A monthly newspaper produced by volunteers since 1972, The Hague Chronicle covers town meetings, the activities of various organizations in the area, and news of the Town of Hague and the greater Lake George area.

== Hague Central School ==
The Town of Hague had its own centralized school district from 1927 to 1979. The former Hague Central School, razed in 1985, stood on the site of the current Hague Community Building, and was constructed in two sections in 1927 and 1930. The centralization of the school districts in Hague came nearly a decade before other towns in the region centralized their schools.

Throughout the 1970s, a bitter battle raged between seasonal and year-round residents over the viability of the school, with a student population of about 200 in grades K-12. Several annexation votes were held between 1971 and 1979. Many argued that consolidation with the Ticonderoga Central School District to the north would reduce taxes in the Town. Ironically, three decades after consolidation, the same segment of seasonal residents that originally pushed for consolidation now are protesting that Hague is taxed disproportionately.

Through the last decades of its existence, Hague athletic teams were known as the Raiders, using various depictions of Indians as their mascot. Originally sporting red and gray colors, those team colors had morphed into red and white by the 1970s.

Hague competed in the old Marcy League, which included teams from Bolton Landing, Chestertown, Horicon, Pottersville, Keene Valley, Indian Lake, Minerva, Newcomb, Long Lake, and Wells. Hague competed in soccer, basketball, and baseball.

In 1977-78 and again in 1978–79, Hague's basketball team advanced in the post-season beyond the sectionals. Competing in Section VII as a Class D school, the Hague Raiders won the Section VII title both years, advancing to the State Semi-Finals in 1978. In 1979 the Raiders advanced to the Capital District Semi-Finals.

== Demographics ==
Historical population
Census	Pop.	Note	%±
1820	514		—
1830	721		40.3%
1840	610		−15.4%
1850	717		17.5%
1860	708		−1.3%
1870	637		−10.0%
1880	807		26.7%
1890	682		−15.5%
1900	1,042		52.8%
1910	1,043		0.1%
1920	1,028		−1.4%
1930	741		−27.9%
1940	739		−0.3%
1950	761		3.0%
1960	771		1.3%
1970	910		18.0%
1980	766		−15.8%
1990	699		−8.7%
2000	854		22.2%
2010	699		−18.1%
2016 (est.)	684		−2.1%
U.S. Decennial Census

As of the census of 2000, there were 854 people, 371 households, and 258 families residing in the town. The population density was 13.3 inhabitants per square mile (5.1/km^{2}). There were 1,047 housing units at an average density of 16.4 per square mile (6.3/km^{2}). The racial makeup of the town was 98.48% White, 0.12% African American, 0.12% Native American, 0.12% Asian, and 1.17% from two or more races. Hispanic or Latino of any race were 0.47% of the population.

There were 371 households, out of which 20.2% had children under the age of 18 living with them, 59.6% were married couples living together, 7.5% had a female householder with no husband present, and 30.2% were non-families. 27.8% of all households were made up of individuals, and 16.7% had someone living alone who was 65 years of age or older. The average household size was 2.30 and the average family size was 2.76.

In the town, the population was spread out, with 19.6% under the age of 18, 4.3% from 18 to 24, 20.6% from 25 to 44, 29.5% from 45 to 64, and 26.0% who were 65 years of age or older. The median age was 48 years. For every 100 females, there were 95.4 males. For every 100 females age 18 and over, there were 92.4 males. The median income for a household in the town was $39,375, and the median income for a family was $48,068. Males had a median income of $40,568 versus $21,964 for females. The per capita income for the town was $27,344. About 4.6% of families and 7.5% of the population were below the poverty line, including 16.1% of those under age 18 and 6.7% of those age 65 or over.

== Communities and locations in Hague ==
- Graphite – A neighborhood of Hague, located on Route 8.
- Hague – A hamlet at the junction of Routes 8 and 9N. Hague is the major community and the only significant business district in the town and is located on the shore of Lake George. This hamlet has ZIP code 12836.
- Jabe Pond – A lake located west of Silver Bay.
- Sabbath Day Point – A neighborhood of Hague, located on Route 9N near the southern town line.
- Silver Bay – A neighborhood of Hague, located on Lake George along Route 9N. This community is centered on the historic Silver Bay Inn, which once served as a private Inn before being sold to the YMCA in 1904. Silver Bay YMCA of the Adirondacks is a family conference center that provides services in a historically rich setting for conferences, family reunions, youth groups, destination weddings, and year-round outdoor and community programs.
