= Lake George Monster =

Fictional lake monster

The Lake George Monster, fittingly nicknamed "Georgie", was a hoax invented by painter Harry Watrous after a fishing bet with newspaper editor Colonel William d'Alton Mann in 1904. The monster was purportedly sighted at Hague Bay in Lake George in New York, United States. This was a reported solution to an ongoing rivalry that Watrous had with another resident (Colonel Mann). After word had spread about, Watrous began to move the monster around the lake for more publicity. The monster was also sighted at The View restaurant, near Hague.

The original monster is currently on display at the Clifton F. West Historical Museum in the Hague Town Hall in Hague, New York. A replica of the monster can be found at the Lake George Historical Museum in Lake George, New York.

== Origin ==
According to Mysteries at the Monument, Harry Watrous and Colonel William Mann were avid fishermen, and the two decided to see who could catch the biggest trout in the lake. When Mann showed Watrous a 40-pound whopper he had just caught, he knew he wasn't going to catch anything bigger and realized he had lost the bet. However, days later, Watrous discovered he had been pranked; Mann had ordered a fake fish, and from a distance it had looked real. Watrous then decided to get even by scaring the colonel. Using a 10-foot-long cedar log, he built a bizarre-looking creature. It had bright red fangs, large eyes, a massive open mouth with a long tongue and strands of whiskers made from hemp rope. Watrous then threaded a 100-foot-long rope through an anchor at the bottom of the lake and through a pulley at the end of the log the monster rested on. By tugging on the rope, he was able to make the monster rise up out of the water at will. Watrous pulled his friendly prank over and over, sparking a frenzy of sightings before abandoning the gag for good. 30 years later, Watrous revived his monster with the intent of revealing his secret as a practical joke.
