= Emma Cunningham =

American murder suspect (1818–1887)

Emma Augusta Hempstead Cunningham (1818–1887) was a woman from New York City who was embroiled in a scandalous relationship that ended in a crime of murder. She was arrested for murder and fraud, and was sent to trial in one of the most famous cases in the Victorian era.

== Scandal ==
Emma Cunningham was a young woman in New York City when she married a widower, George Cunningham in 1835. When he died in 1852 his life insurance policy amounted to $10,000 which was a tidy sum in that era (about $379,452.27 in 2026). As an attractive widow, she met Dr. Harvey Burdell, a prosperous dentist and rented a suite of rooms in his mansion as did other tenants, such as John J. Eckel (later to be accused as an accessory). It was intimated that Cunningham was sexually involved with both of these men.

Dr. Burdell resided and practiced dentistry at his townhouse on 31 Bond Street in New York City, one of the most affluent blocks in pre-Civil War New York. This area declined rapidly in the mid-century and only a few traces of the thirty-five Greek Revival homes remain. Burdell, like his neighbors, was very wealthy, although his reputation was far from sterling as he was accused of embezzlement, reneging on debts and causing a scandal on his wedding day by demanding money from the bride's father who was enraged and canceled the wedding.

== Murder ==
On the morning of January 31, 1857, Dr. Burdell's servants discovered his body in his office, at 31 Bond Street, covered with blood, brutally stabbed multiple times and strangled. Upon police interrogation, some of the servants testified that they heard angry words between the victim and his assailant the night before. The police determined that Dr. Burdell had been stabbed at least 15 times by an assailant who was left-handed. Since Emma Cunningham was left-handed, she was an immediate suspect and was arrested for Burdell's murder and imprisoned for trial.

== Trial ==
The trial, at its time, was as notorious as the O.J. Simpson trial was in the 1990s and was accompanied by a media circus akin to such trials today. A reputed 8,000 people tried to cram into the church for the funeral and Cunningham reportedly threw herself dramatically on Burdell's casket.

During the first evening of the Coroner's investigation, on January 31, 1857, Mrs. Cunningham produced a certificate of marriage revealing that she and Dr. Burdell had been married on October 28, 1856. This gave the prosecutor a suspected motive for murder, for as his wife, she would inherit his fortune. Dr. Burdell's estate was estimated at $100,000 ($3,838,137.93 in 2026) which included the townhouse where he was murdered and various other real estate holdings. All members of the household, including servants, Emma Cunningham and her family, were placed under house arrest by Coroner Edward Connery, as was custom at the time. After a fourteen-day coroner's investigation, which took place in the parlor of 31 Bond Street, the case was delivered to a grand jury, where Emma Cunningham was indicted for the murder of Dr. Burdell. She was placed in jail awaiting her trial. The city’s top defense attorney, Henry Lauren Clinton, represented Emma Cunningham. New York City District Attorney Abraham Oakey Hall was the prosecutor. Hall later became Mayor of New York City in 1869.

At the murder trial, which began in May 1857, there was much testimony from all sides. Cunningham did not testify. One of Burdell's maids testified that Mrs. Cunningham had called him a bad man who was not fit to live. A man named John Eckels, a boarder at the home of Dr. Burdell, was labeled an accessory to the murder, but testimony to his actions was not heard during Cunningham's trial. No testimony to the marriage certificate was heard either, as its validity was being tested in the Surrogate's Court. Burdell's widely-known unsavory reputation made accusation against Cunningham difficult for the prosecutor to make credible. On May 9, 1857, the jury returned a verdict of not guilty and Cunningham was free to go.

== Baby scandal ==
After Emma Cunningham's acquittal, she was permitted to return to the townhouse on 31 Bond Street, pending a hearing and decision of the Surrogate's Court to determine if her marriage to Dr. Harvey Burdell was in fact valid, and if that entitled her to his house and other property. At the time, marriages were conducted by a clergyman in front of witnesses, but they were not registered with any office of the state to make it legal and valid. The marriage certificate in question was signed by a clergyman, both parties, and two witnesses. The clergyman recalled the event. The only way to invalidate the marriage was to prove that it was an imposter and not Dr. Burdell himself who appeared to be married. The Surrogate's decision on the matter of the marriage and the inheritance was scheduled for August 1857.

Prior to that decision, a scandal erupted involving Emma Cunningham. It was purported by District Attorney Oakey Hall that Cunningham had "procured" a baby by paying $1000 to declare a false heir, with the father as Dr. Burdell. This would entitle her to all of Dr. Burdell's fortune, instead of just her widow's share. The prosecutor and chief of police raided her home and removed Cunningham, who was delirious and under the influence of drugs. Also present was a doctor and a baby that had been marked under the arms with acid, as it had been prepared by the district attorney prior to the sting. The "baby scam" had been engineered by the district attorney, and the doctor who testified to the events was his close associate, Dr. de la Montagnie, who was also the godfather of Hall's daughter. Emma Cunningham was briefly taken to the Tombs, the New York City jail where she had previously spent two months awaiting the murder trial.

Her defense attorney, Henry Clinton, had the charges swiftly dismissed based on entrapment and lack of evidence of a crime. Cunningham was again released. To this day it is unclear if the 'baby scam' was fabricated and engineered by the district attorney or if Emma Cunningham was delusional and engaged in the act of attempting to buy an heir. It would be an unlikely move for her to attempt when she was already in line to split a significant fortune with Burdell's relatives. All of the testimony and reportage of her claimed pregnancy was after-the-fact hearsay and never verified as fact. However, the judge in the Surrogate's case was negatively influenced by the incident, and ruled that Emma Cunningham, although acquitted of any wrongdoing, would not inherit any money or property from Burdell's estate.

From August 1857 onward, Emma Cunningham was a free woman; however her reputation was forever tainted, as she would always be suspected of being involved in the infamous murder. By the end of that year, she was penniless and eventually moved to the West Coast. She returned to New York City in 1887, where she died at the home of a cousin at age 69. Her death was reported in the New York Times on September 18, 1887.

During the following century, many of the accounts of the murder repeated the disproved or uncorroborated allegations that had, at the time of the trial, been eliminated from the court proceedings as hearsay or corrected in the press. Over time, there were several unverified confessions to the murder. The murder was never solved.

== Significance ==
In contrast to the trial of Judith Catchpole in 1636 in which an all-female jury was empaneled to inspect her body and determine if she had been pregnant and given birth, Victorian morality prevented such a direct approach. Without proper medical evidence of her condition, there was not a way to prove during the trial that she was not pregnant.

== Gravesite ==
Emma's story was featured a season 1 episode of Monumental Mysteries. According to the series, Cunningham is buried at Green-Wood Cemetery in Brooklyn, New York. Her gray-granite tombstone reads, Emma Augusta Hempstead Cunningham 1818–1887 – "May God Rest Her Troubled Soul" and depicts a beautiful tree etched into the stone. Burdell's grave happens to lie only a hundred yards away from hers. Burdell’s gray-granite tombstone, etched with a weeping willow, reads: Harvey Burdell 1811-1857 – "We humbly beseech thee, O father, to raise us from the life of righteousness; that when we shall depart this life we may rest in him."
