= George Cassiday =

American bootlegger 1892-1967

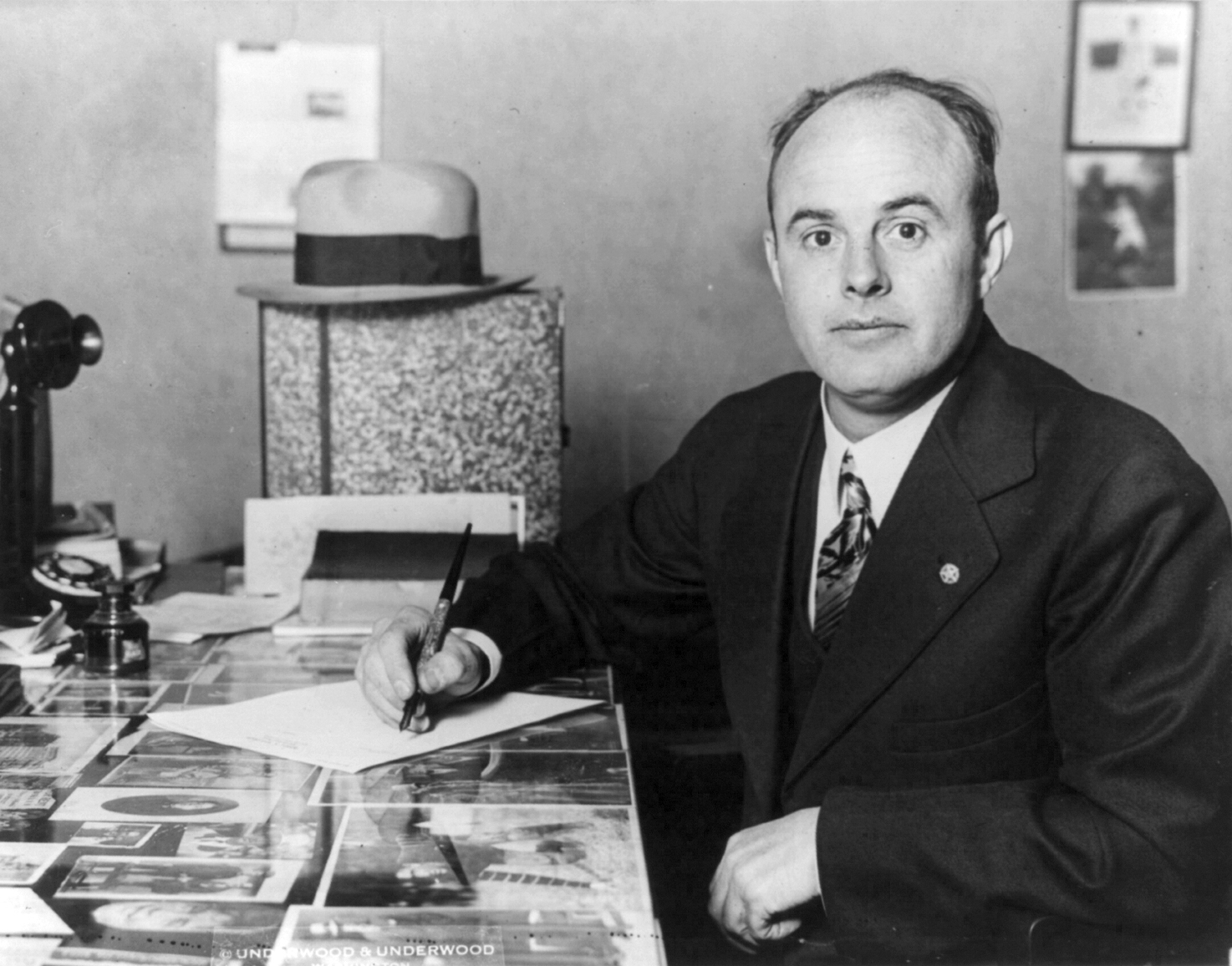
- Cassiday in 1930
- Born: 12 April 1892; Wheeling, West Virginia, U.S.
- Died: 21 January 1967 (aged 74)
- Known for: Bootlegging for US Congress
- Children: 1
- Military career
- Allegiance: United States
- Branch: US Army Tank Corps
- Conflicts: World War I

George L. Cassiday, Sr. (April 12, 1892 – January 21, 1967) was one of the leading bootleggers who sold liquor to members of US congress and senators during National Prohibition. In October 1930, he came forward and told his story in six front-page articles in The Washington Post. The articles pointed out Congressional hypocrisy and made the public even more jaded about Prohibition. His admission made both national news and an impact on the midterm Congressional elections held just a week later.

== Early life and early career ==
Born in 1892 to a Methodist and WCTU family in Wheeling, West Virginia, Cassiday (pronounced "Cass-i-dee") served in a tank crew during World War I. Post-war, he founded the Irish War Veterans Association. When he could not qualify for his pre-war job working for the Pennsylvania Railroad, he came to bootlegging almost by accident. "A friend of mine told me that liquor was bringing better prices on Capitol Hill than anywhere else in Washington and that a living could be made supplying the demand," he wrote in the Post. His first customers were two southern congressmen, both of whom had voted for the Eighteenth Amendment and the Volstead Act.

== Bootlegging career ==
Cassiday operated from the Cannon House Office Building from 1920 to 1925. In 1925, he would be arrested wearing a felt green hat. This granted him the moniker "the man in the green hat", in reference to the Michael Arlen novel of the same name. Following this arrest, he moved to the Russell Senate Office Building, as he noted that senators were more discreet. After his final arrest in February 1930, Cassiday agreed to stop bootlegging. That fall, he agreed to write a series of six articles for The Washington Post. With the exception of naming names, he told his entire story, including how he got his start, where he bought the booze, how he smuggled it in, and how Congress gave him an office to work from. The series ran October 24–29, 1930 (the Post ran an introductory article on October 23). The final article ran exactly one week before the midterm election day.

Cassiday met most members of Congress during his ten years bootlegging. He wrote, "As the result of my experience on Capitol Hill since prohibition went into effect I would say that four out of five senators and congressmen consume liquor either at their offices or their homes."

Cassiday concluded his article series by declaring that he was giving up bootlegging. He accepted responsibility, but said that Congress was likewise culpable. "Considering that I took the risk and did the leg work from 1920 to 1930, I am more than willing to let the general public decide how I stack up with the senator or representative who ordered the stuff and consumed it on the premises or transported it to his home." Cassiday's articles in The Washington Post were a contributing factor to the Republican defeat in the 1930 midterm election. The dry Republican majority was ousted, and replaced by a wet Democratic majority that supported the repeal of Prohibition.

== Arrest, conviction and later life ==
After his 1930 arrest, Cassiday was convicted of a felony and sentenced to eighteen months imprisonment. He never spent a night in prison, as he was allowed to sign out every night and sign back in the next morning. He went on to work in a shoe factory and several hotels in the Washington area. He died in 1967 at the age of 74. Cassiday's second wife destroyed the "black book" that Cassiday used to keep track of customers and their purchases. He never revealed the identities of his customers, beyond admitting that it was most of Congress.

In 2012, the first post-Prohibition distillery in Washington, DC, New Columbia Distillers, launched Green Hat Gin named after Cassiday.
