= Mount Everts =

Mountain in Montana, United States

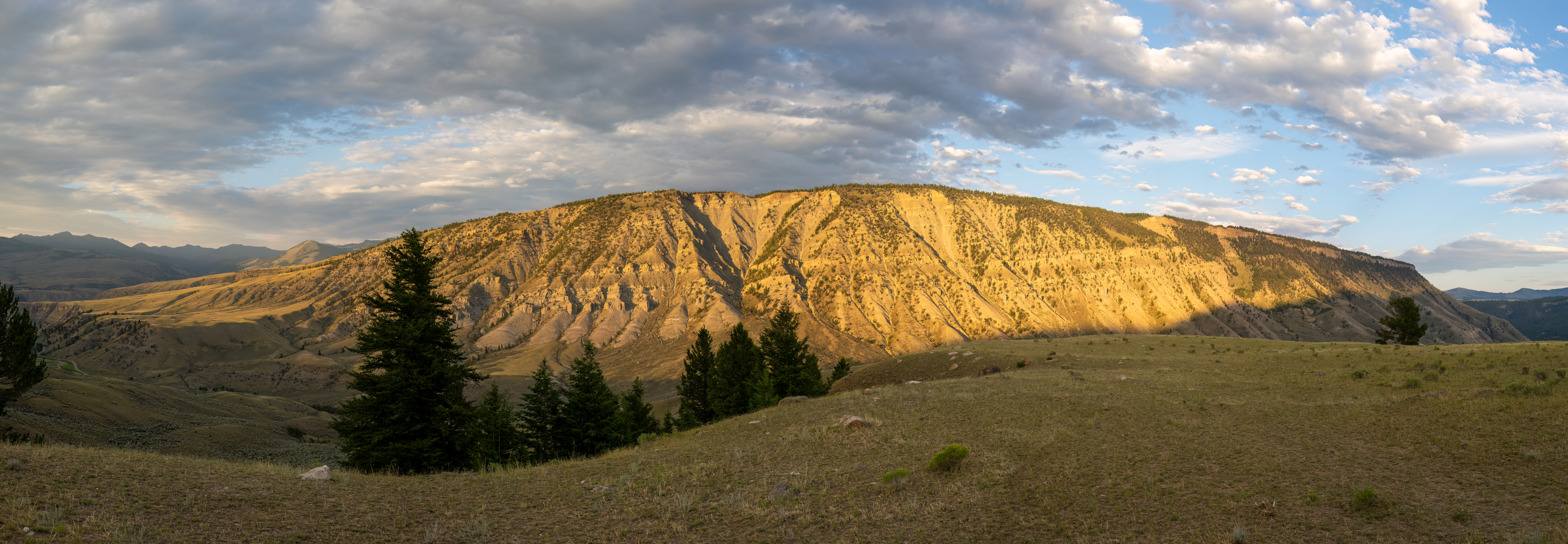

Highest point
- Elevation: 8,849 ft (2,697 m) NAVD 88
- Coordinates: 44°58′30″N 110°39′41″W

Geography
- Location within Wyoming
- Location: Yellowstone National Park, Park County, Wyoming, U.S.
- Parent range: Gallatin Range
- Topo map: USGS Mammoth

Geology
- Rock age: Cretaceous

Mount Everts, elevation 7,846 feet (2,391 m), is a prominent mountain peak in Yellowstone National Park, Wyoming, near Mammoth Hot Springs. The peak was named for Truman C. Everts, a member of the Washburn–Langford–Doane Expedition of 1870. Mount Everts is located immediately due south of Gardiner, Montana and due east of Mammoth Hot Springs.

== History ==
Mount Everts was named by Henry D. Washburn shortly after the rescue of Truman C. Everts, who had been lost for 37 days in Yellowstone at the conclusion of the Washburn Expedition. During the expedition, Washburn named a peak (now called Mount Sheridan ) in the Thorofare region south of Yellowstone Lake for Everts but later changed it to the current peak, believing it was very near the location of Everts' rescue. Everts was in fact rescued a few miles to the northeast, near where Blacktail Deer Creek enters the Yellowstone River at the northern park boundary, and the mountain is the dominant feature separating what is now known as Gardiner from the northerly flowing Yellowstone River. Mr. Everts complained until his death that the far more grand Mount Sheridan should have been named after him.

== Geology ==
The majority of Mt. Everts is made of Cretaceous era sediments. The Cretaceous Interior Seaway deposited sediments across North America from 120 to 70 million years ago. The first of these deposits in the Yellowstone region was the Telegraph Creek formation (100 mya) and is predominantly shale. The Eagle formation (75 mya) is dominated by sandstone and was deposited in shallower water along deltas and beaches. The Everts formation (70 mya) is dominated by sandstone and has coal seams from plant debris that collected in swampy areas.

There are no rocks on Mt. Everts from 65 to 2.1 million years ago. The absence of rocks is called an unconformity. During this period few or no rocks were deposited, and erosion carried away any sediments that were deposited.

The eruption of the Yellowstone hot spot 2.1 million years ago deposited the Huckleberry Ridge tuff on the southern part of Mt. Everts. It is the youngest rock on the mountain. The tuff was made by multiple eruptions around 2.1 million years ago. Ash fall from the earliest part of the eruption was deposited first and can be seen as a thin strip of white rock eight feet tall. This air fall ash was so hot that it baked the sedimentary rocks it covered. The sedimentary rocks turned a darker shade of red because the heat caused red iron oxide minerals to form.

Next, pyroclastic flows moved through the region, sometimes at speeds of hundreds of miles per hour, depositing the bulk of the Huckleberry Ridge tuff. The tuff was originally deposited evenly across the area when the region was lower than surrounding hills. Deposits from streams just beneath the Huckleberry Ridge tuff show that this area was at a low elevation just before the eruption.

A combination of thermal bulging and erosion caused Mt. Everts to rise 1600 feet in the last 2.1 million years. This is called topographic inversion, because the lower areas become the higher areas. Thermal bulging related to the Yellowstone hot spot caused the bulk of the uplift. Erosion of surrounding areas also deepened nearby canyons because the tuff is harder, and therefore more resistant to erosion, than the other rocks.

== Gallery ==
Images of Mount Everts
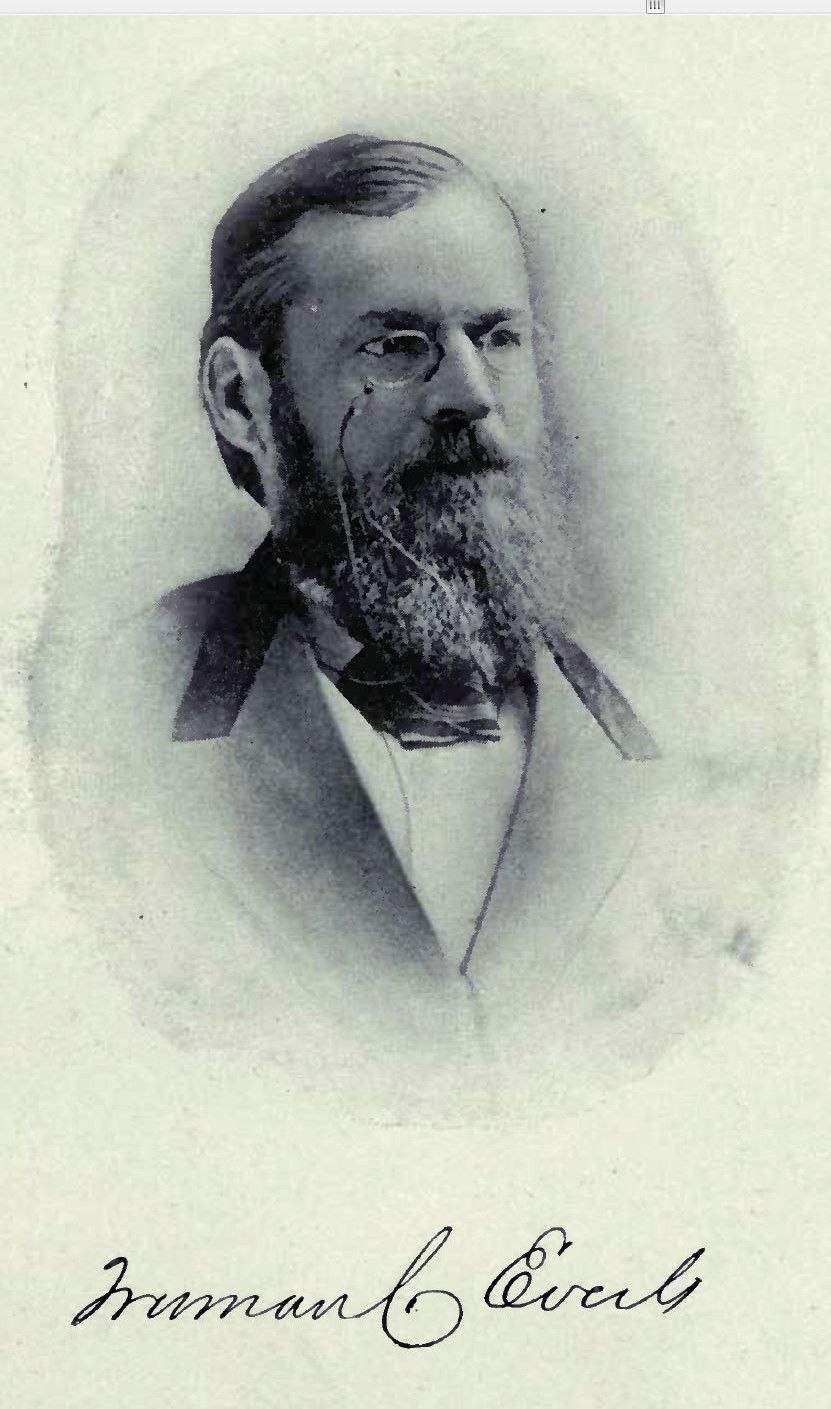
Mount Everts' namesake, Truman C. Everts

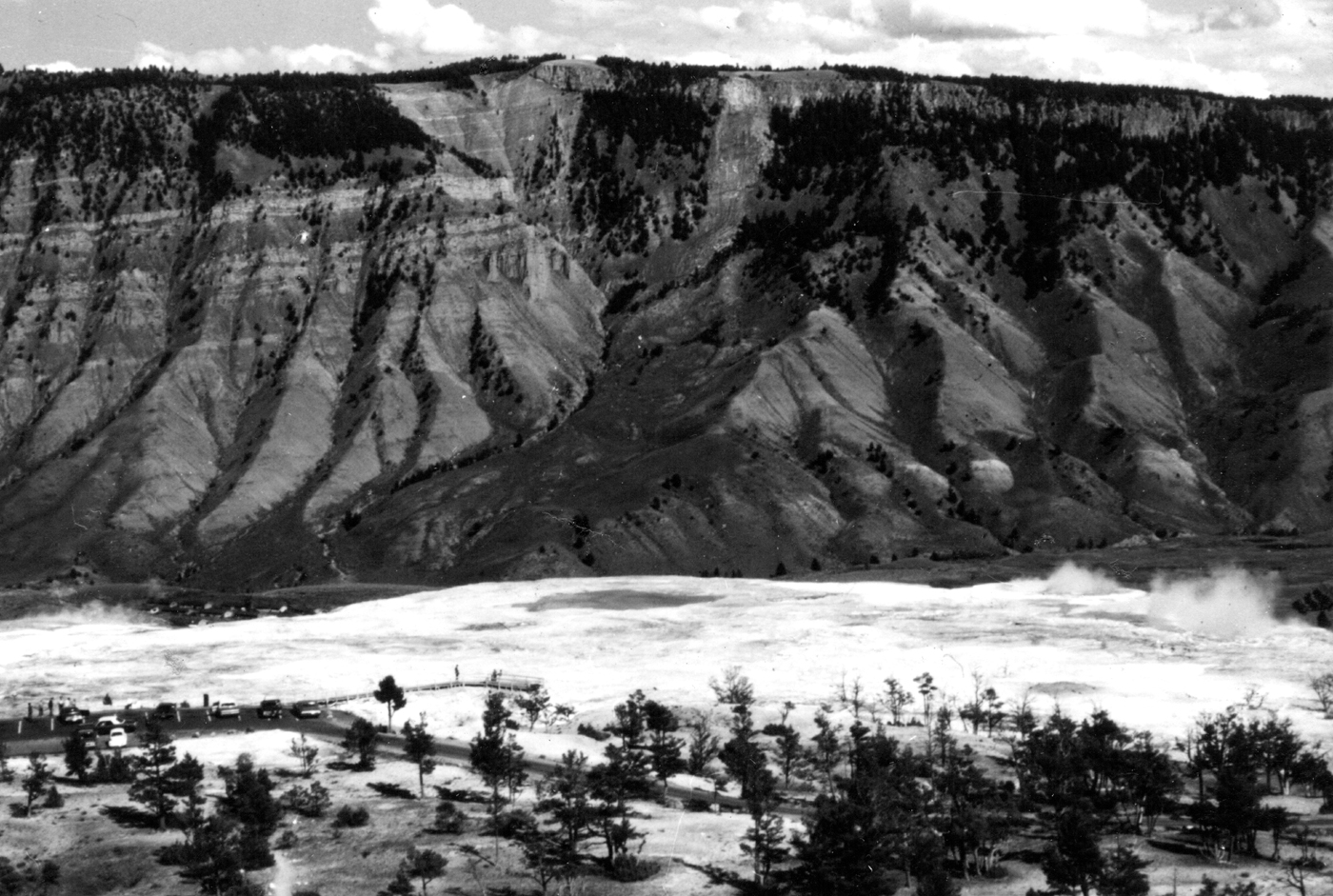
Mount Everts from Mammoth terraces

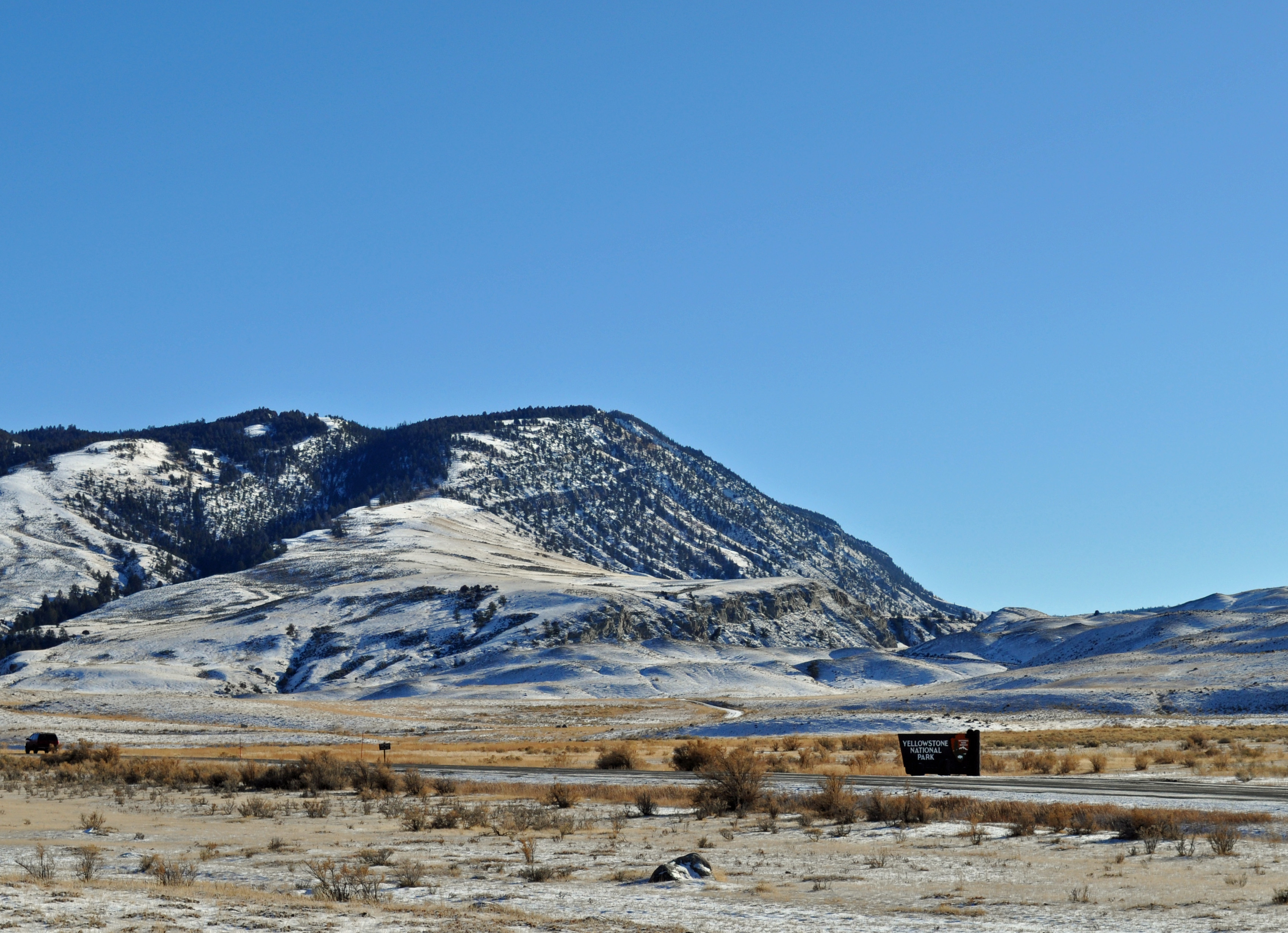
Mount Everts from Gardiner, Montana

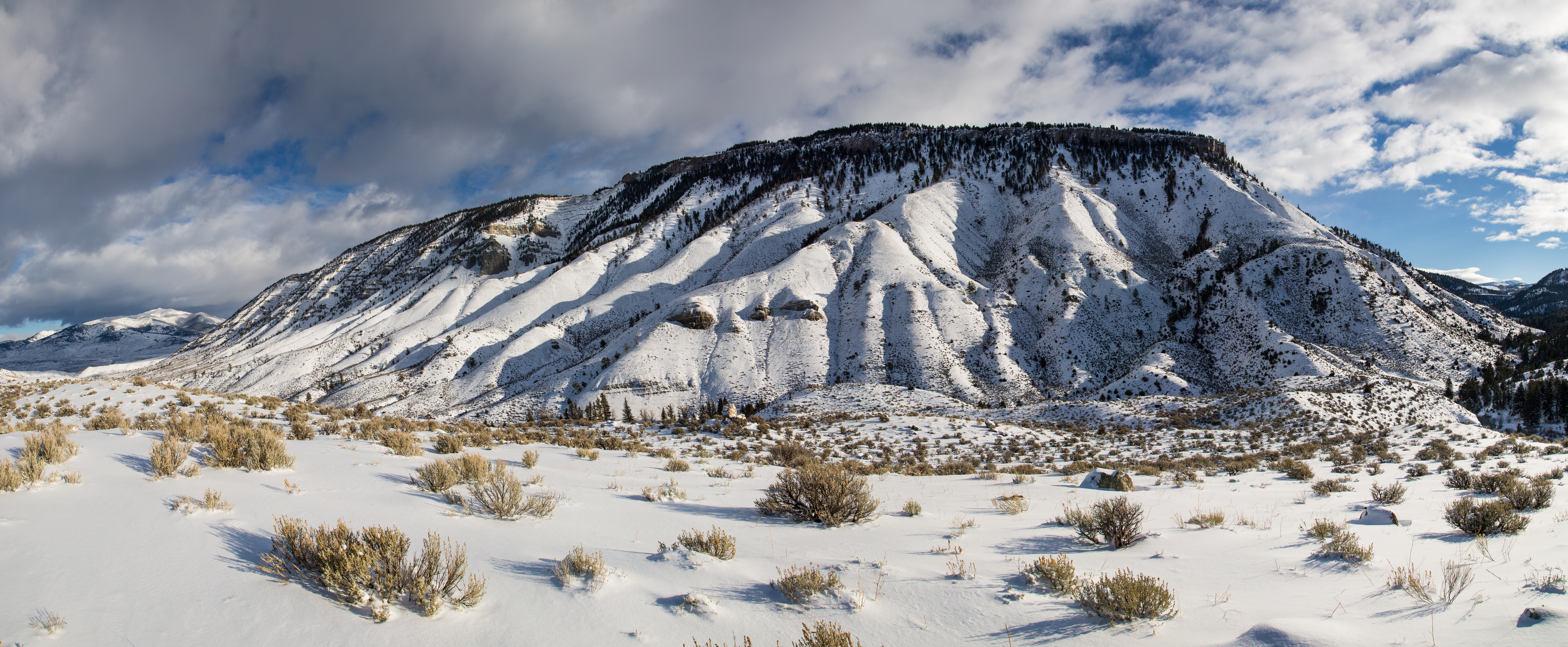

== See also ==
- Mountains and mountain ranges of Yellowstone National Park
