= Electric Sugar Refining Company =

Fraudulent sugar refining company founded in 1884

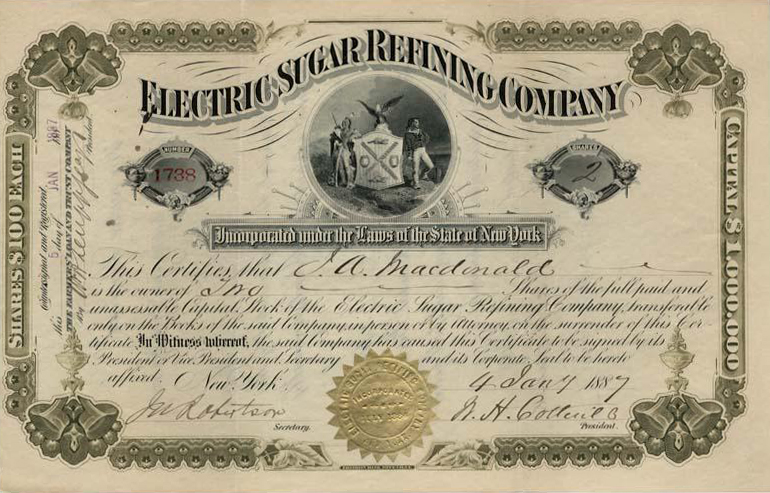
Stock Certificate from the Electric Sugar Refining Company

The Electric Sugar Refining Company was a company founded in 1884 in the United States to commercialize a sugar refining process supposedly invented by "Professor" Henry Friend.

The company collapsed in 1889, after it was revealed that "Professor" Friend's process was a complete fabrication. The hoax remained in the national media spotlight for years as the matter wound through the court system in Washtenaw County, Michigan and in New York.

== Early scandals involving grapes and sugar ==
Little is known about the early life of Henry Friend (or Freund, as he was sometimes known). He claimed to be a German chemist, although it is more likely he was American-born, and he appeared to be about 50 years old in the early 1880s. In 1881, Friend was getting experience in corporate fraud. He appeared in Chicago, with the claim that he had perfected the process of refining sugar from grapes. Friend attracted investors, and soon instigated investors to form the Chicago Grape and Cane Sugar Refining Company. However, one of his investors caught on to the scam and had him charged with obtaining money under false pretenses. The company collapsed. The investor later dropped the charges, and Friend was released.

== Background ==
The Electric Sugar Refining Machine story is centered in Milan, Michigan, since most of the participants were born and raised in Milan. In about 1882, Friend was in Chicago and happened to meet Rev. William Howard and Emma (Emily) Howard. (Emily and Howard were claiming to be married at the time, but they could not officially marry, since Rev. Howard had left his wife and children in Rhode Island without bothering to get a divorce.)

Then Emma's daughter, Olive VanNess Tibado, came to Chicago to visit, and apparently there was an attraction between her and Friend, ultimately leading to their marriage. According to the marriage records from Berrien County, Henry and Olive were married February 3, 1883, in Niles, Michigan. Henry was recorded as being age 41 and a resident of Chicago, born in New York, and his occupation listed as Chemist; Olive, as age 31 and also a resident of Chicago. The marriage was witnessed by Rev. and Emily Howard.

Around 1883, Friend, his wife, the Reverend, and Emily, went to New York City. The group was looking for investors willing to set up a company based on the "electric sugar refining machine," which used electricity to refine sugar at a cost of 80 cents per ton, less than 10% of the cost of current manufacturing processes. In reality, Friend did not have any machine, and his process was a complete hoax, so the group insisted that their machine was a "secret" so that others could not steal their idea.

== Beginning ==
He approached Theodore Havemeyer, whose family controlled much of the sugar refining industry, to secure backing for his invention. However, Havemeyer insisted that Friend reveal his process before providing any financial backing. Friend refused, since he had no machine to show. Friend turned to other potential investors, setting up "demonstrations" and telling investors they would become rich beyond their wildest dreams. Friend and Howard set up demonstrations at their home in New York, hoping to lure investors. The potential investors would bring in a barrel of dirty, unrefined sugar, along with a clean, empty barrel for the refined sugar. The potential investors had to leave the room while he used his so-called secret machine to turn raw sugar into refined sugar. In fact, Olive or someone else was upstairs with bags of pure white refined sugar. "Prof." Friend would empty the unrefined sugar into a pipe leading into the river. Olive poured the clean sugar through a hole in the floor, filling the clean barrel. After a couple hours or so, Friend invited the prospective investors into his room where they could admire the results of his wonderful machine—a clean barrel full of beautiful white refined sugar. Friend's supposed refining always took place in a secret room, where he simply switched a barrel of refined sugar for a barrel of raw sugar, and claimed that his machine had done the refining.

In December 1883, Friend finally met W. H. Cotterill, a former London solicitor, and convinced him of the utility of the sugar refining process. During the following year, Cotterill helped Friend set up the Electric Sugar Refining Company, with Robert N. Woodworth as president and Cotterill as vice-president. The company prospectus said, in part,

Raw sugar of the lowest grade, either from beetroot or the sugar cane can be converted into refined sugar of the highest grade as easily as raw sugar of the highest grade; and it is said that the loss in weight will not exceed one percent of the whole saccharine matter. The time required is only four hours, and any description of refined sugar can be produced, from the finest powdered up to and including cut and pressed loaf. The principal agent employed in the process is electricity, and as it has been ascertained that the cost will not be more than 3s. 4d. per ton, the invention bids fair to work a complete revolution in sugar refining.

Friend maintained a 60% ownership in the company, while Cotterill and other American investors put up $100,000 for a 10% stake. The remaining 30% of the company shares were sold in England, bringing in another $300,000.

== Skepticism ==
Despite the enthusiasm from investors, knowledgeable people in the sugar industry were, like Havemeyer, skeptical of Friend's process. Some sugar refiners felt the whole thing could not possibly work, but bought stock anyway to hedge their bets. Members of the public wanted to believe that an electric process could dramatically cut the costs of sugar production, so they ignored possible warning signs along the way. One of the officers of the sugar company, James U. Robertson, was a member of the Christadelphians. Robertson honestly believed the company was about to establish a working electric sugar refinery. Due to his position with the company, Christadelphians in the US and England eagerly bought up stock in the company, sometimes with the intention of building a temple for their religious group with the profits. As early as 1885, after one of the first larger demonstrations, a commentator wrote in The Sugar Cane,

In February last the sugar world was startled by the announcement that a discovery had been made by which sugar could be refined by means of Electricity in a few hours — almost "while you wait" — at the trifling cost of 3s. 4d. per ton. A demonstration, at which no one was present but the inventor, took place in New York, when seven tons were, it was stated, refined in as many hours. Five gentlemen testified to its genuineness; none of them, however, were present, and some of them had a direct interest in promoting the company to be formed for working the invention on a large scale. Professor Friend, we were informed, was coming to Liverpool with his machine, for the purpose of making a series of demonstrations in the presence of witnesses. The Professor has been over, and has returned to New York — but there have been no demonstrations. The reason he gives for not carrying out his intentions may appear satisfactory to him and his friends, but not so to impartial outsiders. It is now ten months since we first heard of this "invention" and, excepting the "demonstration" in New York, we do not hear that anything has been done, except, of course, raising share capital for the avowed purpose of refining on a large scale. If there is any truth at all in what is stated of this invention, why have not the company been at work on a small scale, if only 10 tons per day? By this time they would have realized a small fortune. Those who have put any money into this venture, we fear, will not see it again.

Likewise, Bradstreet said in 1885 that "the process of Prof. Friend is as mysterious as ever. There is no known responsibility to the company, and its collapse at an early date is predicted."

At a meeting of the Society of Chemical Industry in Liverpool in late 1886, to which a representative of the company had been invited, one presenter noted that "I think you will all agree that the practical difficulties of sugar refining prevent any likelihood of electricity being advantageously in the process." After comments from the Electric Sugar Refining representative, the meeting chair made some pointed comments, summarized as "there was a very proper tendency to disbelieve anything that is absolutely secret... There was no piece of evidence that would cause people to invest money in it; and he could only express hope that the gentlemen who so generously and boldly risked their money might get it back some time.

By 1888, critics were becoming more vocal. Early that year, J.B. Wallace, a sugar-dealer from Liverpool, investigated the New York "refinery" of the Electric Sugar Refining Company. After being repeatedly rebuffed, he concluded that something was "very fishy" and cabled his friends in Liverpool to sell stock in the company. The company got wind of Wallace's charges, and demanded they be retracted; Wallace refused, and the company did not press the issue. Later in 1888, another industry expert wrote in The Sugar Beet:

Very few sugar experts believe in the claims of the would-be company, viz: that thirteen barrels of raw sugar were refined; as raw, this quantity was emptied into an apparatus and run through several secret rooms containing the machinery. (?) It is maintained that in twenty-five minutes refined sugar was turned out at a rate of one barrel for every two minutes. (?)... We must admit that somehow there seems to be a paradox involved, since a current of electricity passing through a saccharine solution will invert the sucrose to glucose.

== Riding high ==
Despite the skepticism, the fortunes of the company remained high. Friend purchased a Brooklyn flour mill for $40,000 to continue experimenting with his process, and obtained another $180,000 to supposedly purchase equipment. (Later investigation suggested that little of this money was actually used for the purchase of machinery.)

Friend's wife Olive, her mother Emily Burnham Howard, and stepfather William Howard moved in with Friend and helped him stage demonstrations of his machine. He still refused to tell anyone else the secret of his process, explaining that it wasn't patentable, and he dare not reveal it until a full-scale refinery was built. However, he continued to give small-scale demonstrations in a heavily secured room in the factory, and the fortunes of the company boomed, with stock prices jumping from $100 per share in 1884 to a maximum of $625 per share in 1888.

Soon after the company started, President Woodworth bowed out of the company under some cloud. Cotterill took over the position of company president. As the company prospered, Friend began to spend lavishly and drink heavily, especially bourbon. He was given a large allowance for the cost of setting up the refinery, and used the money on fast horses and sporty carriages. He was seen speeding around New York streets and parks, riding his sleighs in winter and his carriages in summer, slugging down bourbon, as reported in The Philadelphia Inquirer. He died of alcoholism on March 10, 1888, a day before the Great Blizzard of 1888 hit the city. He was buried during the blizzard with little fanfare. It was later suggested that the officers of the Electric Sugar Refining Company had attempted to conceal his death so as to not scare investors. This seems likely; to this day, no death certificate can be found for Friend, and researchers can only guess where his burial took place.

== Downfall ==
After Friend's death, Olive Friend and her parents took control of the company and moved into the Brooklyn factory. Olive assured Cotterill and the other investors that she knew the secret of Friend's refining process, but made no visible progress toward setting up a factory.

In early 1888 Olive realized that the scam would undoubtedly come to light at some point, and she would need a place to live after the problems "hit the fan." She started building a stick-style Victorian dream home on County Road in Milan, Michigan, her old home town. She was thinking that she and her husband and their little boy would go there, enjoy their money, and live quiet, happy lives, far away from the problems in New York. At the same time, her mother built a house at Arkona Road and Platt Road, just north of Milan, which was nearly an exact copy of Olive's home. Olive moved into her Milan home with her son, leaving her uncle, Henry Harrison Hack, to auction off her furniture and other property back in New York. The officers of the Electric Sugar Refining Company did not find this behavior suspicious.

Olive's step-father, William E. Howard, took up the reins and ran the whole operation. Howard had some help from the Halstead brothers, Gus and George, who assisted with hauling barrels of pure refined sugar to the "refinery" and putting on the regular public shows, demonstrating the "production" of refined sugar.

Still clinging to any signs of hope, Cotteril and the other officials still believed that Olive Friend might have the secret to her late husband's refining process. Their contract with Henry Friend was also signed by Olive, with Olive promising she would reveal the secret (for a payment) if her husband died. Officials felt that all was not lost, since Olive could still rescue them by revealing the secret. In December he travelled to Michigan to bargain for the secret, but Olive Friend was evasive, even after Cotterill bluntly asked if "the refined sugar was made direct from the raw or not." Olive Friend's evasiveness left Cotterill deeply suspicious, and he immediately telegraphed the officers of the company and returned to New York. This was reported in The New York Times January 6, 1889.

At the end of 1888, company officials were puzzled. The refinery was silent. None of the Milan people were around to run the refinery. Cotterill took a train to Milan to investigate. Olive's uncle, Lyman Burnam, had left New York and was relaxing in Milan when Cotterill found him. Burnam told him straight out that the whole thing was "humbug." Source: New York Times article of January 6, 1889.

On January 2, 1889, Cotterill and other officers of the Electric Sugar Refining Company broke into the secured room in the factory, at 18 Hamilton Street, Brooklyn. There they found no specialized machinery, but did find stockpiled raw sugar that had supposedly been turned into refined sugar. Cases apparently full of machinery were actually filled with refined sugar purchased elsewhere. The refined sugar had obviously been poured down from the secret room to the area where visitors were gathered, to impress potential investors.

News of the hoax quickly spread, and the company collapsed, its shares worthless. In a post-mortem an industry commentator noted: It is simply astonishing what magical effect "electrical" attached to the name of an invention or swindle has upon the community. We are living in a generation of electrical discovery. We have time and again been startled by some new invention for transmitting the voice or its power to a distance. [However, ] sugar refiners well know the facts of the case, and were never much alarmed by the possibilities of the Electrical Sugar Refining Company already mentioned. For some time, Cotterill and others held out hope that Friend had indeed developed some process for chemically purifying refined sugar (rather than refining raw sugar), but it was not to be. With no hope of producing anything commercially, and few assets, the Electric Sugar Refining Company was dissolved in May 1889.

== Afterward ==
It was not easy to arrest the Milan family in their own hometown. It took careful orchestration of Cotterill and Washtenaw sheriff's deputies to pull it off. First, they had to wait for William Howard to return to Milan from his hide-out in Canada. Then they served Olive and her family with legal papers during the day on February 16, 1889. The papers had to do with seizing their homes and cash, but nothing about criminal charges. That afternoon, Cotterill made a big showing of the fact that he was taking the train to New York, as if he had given up on arresting Olive or her family.

On the evening of Feb. 16, Olive was at her fancy new home on County Street with her mother, step-father, along with her shirt-tail cousins George and Gus Halstead. Sheriff's deputies sneaked up on them at night and arrested the whole lot, transporting them in wagons or carriages to a jail in Ann Arbor.

The defendants were able to throw in some legal arguments to delay their extradition to New York. From their jail cells in Ann Arbor, they tried to argue to the Michigan Governor that extradition would violate their rights. Eventually they were taken to a train and taken to New York where they were put behind bars.

In February 1889, Olive Friend, her parents, and two others connected with them were arrested and brought back to New York. Olive Friend's stepfather, William Howard, was convicted to nine years and eight months of hard labor in Sing Sing Prison. Olive and her mother pleaded guilty to grand larceny in late 1889, and were sentenced to time served. The two returned to Milan, where Olive had built a grand house for herself and another one for her mother.

In 1892, Cotterill and other officers of the Electric Sugar Refining Company sued Olive Friend in an attempt to recover some of the $196,000 they claimed had been paid to the Friends by the company. The defense, however, argued that Cotterill and others in the company must have known of the fraud well before the company collapsed. The jury verdict apparently agreed, and rendered a verdict of no cause for action.

== Family Tree ==
The co-conspirators in the scheme were all related to each other.

=== Olive Friend ===
Olive Friend was born in Ohio in December 1852, the daughter of Jacob Van Ness and Emily Burnham Van Ness. She had three younger sisters. Olive married Oliver Tibado September 26, 1867, in Washtenaw County, MI. They had no children. He was a farm laborer. They divorced; by 1880, he had remarried. Henry C. Friend and Mrs. Olive E. Van Ness were married February 3, 1883, in Niles, Mich. He was 41 and a resident of Chicago. The bride, Mrs. Olive E. Van Ness, was 31, resident of Chicago. Olive married George Halstead May 14, 1899, in Essex County, Ontario, Canada. She died October 29, 1902, in Detroit, Michigan. She was buried at Evergreen Cemetery in Ransom, Hillsdale County, Michigan. Her grave is unmarked, in row 21, section 15.

=== Emily Burnham Howard ===
Emily Burnham was born in New York in 1831 along with a twin brother, Eben. Emily was one of six children. Her parents were Allen Burnham and Olive M. Hanson Burnham. As a baby, Emily and her family moved to York township, just north of Milan, Mich. Emily was only 5 years old when her father died, struck by lightning. Emily Burnham married Jacob M. Van Ness October 3, 1850, in Washtenaw County. They had 4 children, including Olive, then divorced. She married William E. Howard on September 3, 1883, in Will County, Illinois. Emily Howard died October 12, 1898. She was buried near her father in Judd Cemetery, which is located in York Township between Milan and Saline.

=== William E. Howard ===
William Eaton Howard was born in Bozarahville, Conn. May 13, 1833, the son of James and Mary Ann Tracey Howard. He was one of 13 children in the family. William E. Howard was ordained to the ministry at Ashland, RI about 1857 by the Free Methodist Church. In the census of 1860, he was in Rhode Island and listed his occupation as Clergy. William E. Howard entered the military August 11, 1862, for the Civil War. He enrolled in Battery H of the First Rhode Island Light Artillery. He was mustered out of the service June 28, 1865. He was in several military campaigns and his battery fought in two battles, May 15, 1863, at Union Mills, VA and April 2, 1865, at Petersburg, VA. William's older brother, Joseph, went to Saline, Michigan, which is near Milan. About 1870, William E. Howard also went to Saline, but his second wife, Elizabeth Hannah Howard, did not go with him. He also left behind his three small children. Howard was in Battle Creek, Michigan, with Emma, where he was selling life insurance. He was living with "Emma," and told the Census taker that she was his wife. He married Emily VanNess in Illinois. After her death in 1898, he married his third wife, Alice Langworthy Leonard on September 14, 1899, in Milan. William E. Howard died April 13, 1917, from "angina pectoris." He was 83 years, 11 months old, buried in Marble Park Cemetery, Milan. His obituary mentions that he had two sons by a previous marriage, Charles H. and Clarence, referring to the children he left behind in Rhode Island.

=== Henry C. Friend ===
Henry C. Friend was born in 1842 in either New York or Pennsylvania. He was married to Olive VanNess Tibado on February 3, 1883, in Niles, Mich. according to marriage records from Berrien County. He and his wife Olive had one son, William, who was born in April, 1885 in either Chicago or New York. Friend told people he was a chemist, and went by the name "Prof. Henry Friend" however researchers have not found any evidence of education or training in chemistry. He died March 10, 1888, in New York, about a day before the Great Blizzard. He was apparently sick for about six weeks before he died, but corporate officials were taken by surprise.

=== Lyman Burnham ===
Lyman Burnham was born in New York in 1828. As a small child, he and his family moved to York Township, just north of Milan, Michigan. He served in the military during the Civil War. In 1874, an atlas of York township, Michigan, showed an advertisement for the "Milan House" hotel in downtown Milan, with Lyman Burnham listed as the proprietor. Lyman had a carriage repair shop in Milan, and sold it to the Village of Milan in about 1885 so the Village could build a fire barn there. After selling his shop, he went to Chicago to help his sister, Emily, with the Electric Sugar Refining Machine venture. Lyman married his fourth wife, Delia Pratt Hardy, in Sandwich, Ontario, Canada in 1903. Lyman died September 11, 1915, and is buried in Marble Park Cemetery, Milan, Mich.

=== George Halstead ===
George Halstead went to New York along with his brother, Gus Halstead, to help with the heavy lifting and labor that would be involved with the project. George M. Halstead was married May 14, 1899, to Olive E. Friend in Essex county, Ontario. He indicated at that time that he was a saloon keeper. In 1900, he answered the census in Detroit, Michigan, where he was living with his wife, Olive, and her son William. Also living in the home: a live-in housekeeper.

=== Gus Halstead ===
Oren Augustus "Gus" Halstead was born October 14, 1852, in Hillsdale County, Michigan. He was one of 14 children. He married Emma Frances Burnham June 24, 1876, and they had two daughters. He took time off from his family to go to New York to work in the Electric Sugar venture with his wife's uncle, Lyman Burnham. Gus married his second wife, Ella F. VanGeison July 16, 1913. Gus died April 29, 1921, at his home three miles east of Milan. He was buried in London Cemetery.

=== Henry Hack ===
William Henry Harrison Hack was born July 2, 1837, in Milan. His father was a founder of Milan. He married Mary Case on January 24, 1864. She was the sister of Emily Howard, and she was Olive Friend's aunt. Olive purchased land for her Milan home from her uncle Henry. He did not participate directly in the scam, but he accommodated his niece. When her husband died, Hack was in New York sitting at his bedside. Then Hack arranged for the auction and sale of Olive's furniture and belongings while she left New York and went to Milan with her son. Hack was an important person in Milan, on the board of the Farmers and Merchants Bank, and serving as a Justice of the Peace. Henry Hack died June 17, 1907, at his home at 775 County St., Milan.
