= Friend–Hack House =

Historic house in Michigan, United States

- U.S. National Register of Historic Places
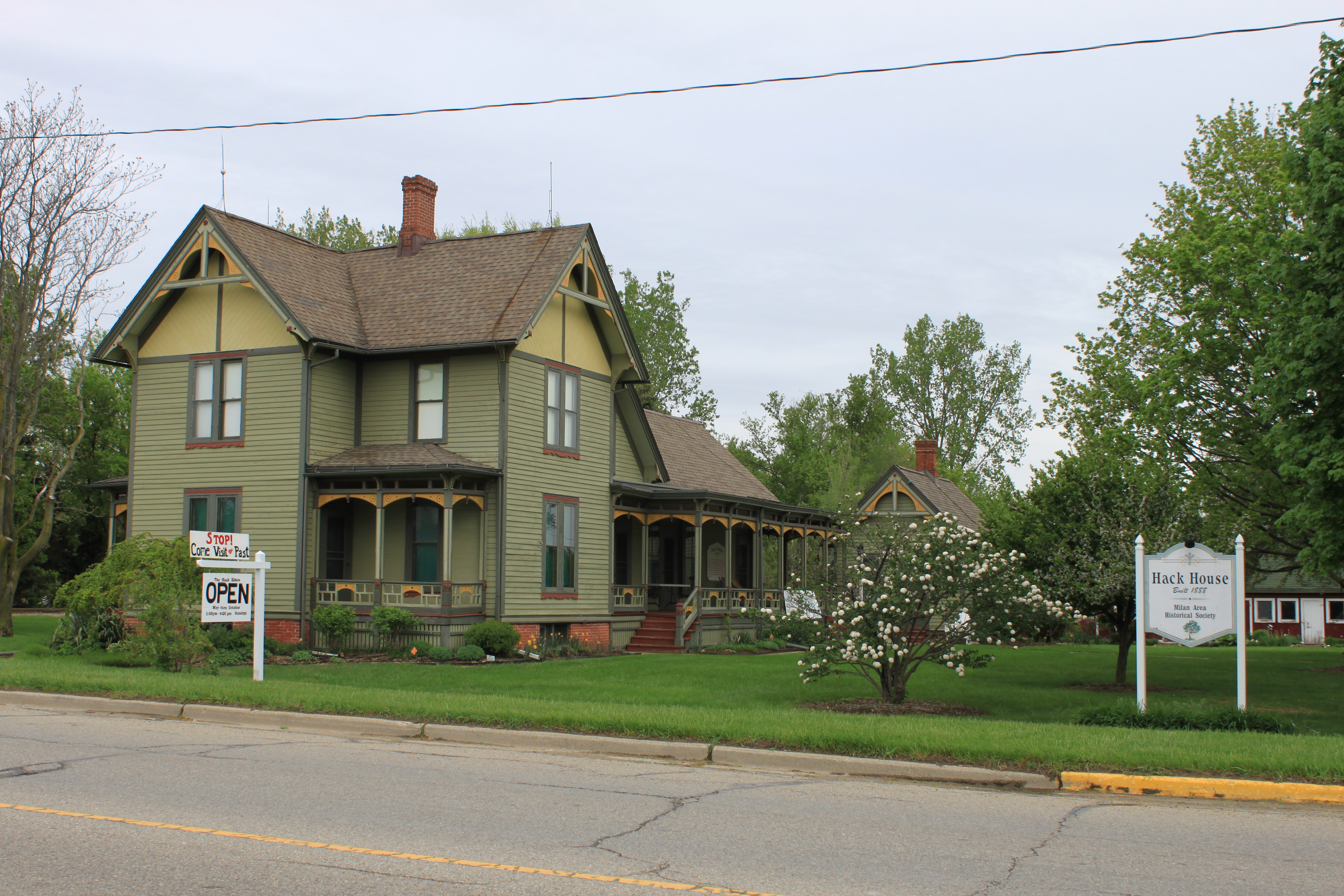

- Location within Michigan Location within the United States
- Interactive map
- Location: 775 County St., Milan, Michigan
- Coordinates: 42°5′5″N 83°40′15″W
- Area: 1.3 acres (0.53 ha)
- Built: 1888
- Architectural style: Stick / Eastlake
- NRHP reference No.: 91000441
- Added to NRHP: April 25, 1991

The Friend–Hack House, also known as the Hack House, was built as a private house, located at 775 County Street in Milan, Michigan. It was listed on the National Register of Historic Places in 1991, and currently houses the Hack House Museum.

The Hack House hosts small events every so often, such as Ice Cream Social Sunday in the summer. In fall, visitors can pick out pumpkins and gourds, and use the corn sheller in the barn. The Hack House is open from May to Late November, Sundays from 1:00pm to 4:00pm.

== History ==
In the mid-1880s, Professor Henry Friend (or Freund) arrived in New York City, claiming to have invented a process that used electricity to refine sugar. In 1884, Friend founded the Electric Sugar Refining Company with a capitalization of $1,000,000. Friend purchased a Brooklyn factory to continue experimenting with his process, and the fortunes of the company boomed, with stock prices jumping from $100 per share in 1884 to $625 per share in 1888. However, Friend suffered from various health problems, exacerbated by heavy drinking, and died on March 10, 1888. After Friend's death, his young widow Olive and her parents took control of the company.

Olive was originally from Milan, Michigan, and purchased 80 acres from her uncle William Henry Harrison ("Uncle Henry" to Olive) Hack. She had this house built for her on the property. After her husband's death, she and her young son lived for a while in the Brooklyn factory, then retired to Milan later in 1888. Becoming suspicious, other officers in the Electric Sugar Refining Company contacted her, then began investigating the company's factory. In early 1889, they discovered that Professor Henry Friend's "process" was a complete fraud, and that no machine existed. Olive Friend and her parents were arrested and returned to New York. Although her father was sentenced to nine years in prison, both Olive and her mother were released in late 1889 after being sentenced to time served.

Olive returned to this house, and soon constructed an addition on the rear. Her mother built a nearly identical home just northwest of Milan on Arkona Road. Olive soon remarried, moved to Detroit, and sold the house to her uncle William Henry Hack; she died in 1902. William and Mary Hack moved into the house, and in 1901 their son James and his wife Daisy moved in. James and Daisy Hack lived in the house until 1973, when it was purchased by Owens-Illinois. In 1980, the company donated the house to the Milan Area Historical Society, who operate it as the Hack House Museum.

== Description ==
The Friend–Hack House is probably the best example of Stick / Eastlake style architecture in Milan. It is a sprawling two-story structure with a gable roof, with single-story rear and side additions. It is clad in clapboard, including diagonal boarding in the gables, and features decorative kingposts under the gables. Large verandahs line the house. Outbuildings around the house include a wash house, outhouse, carriage house/stable, and a chicken coop.
