= Truman C. Everts =

Part of the Washburn-Langford-Doane Expedition (1816-1901)

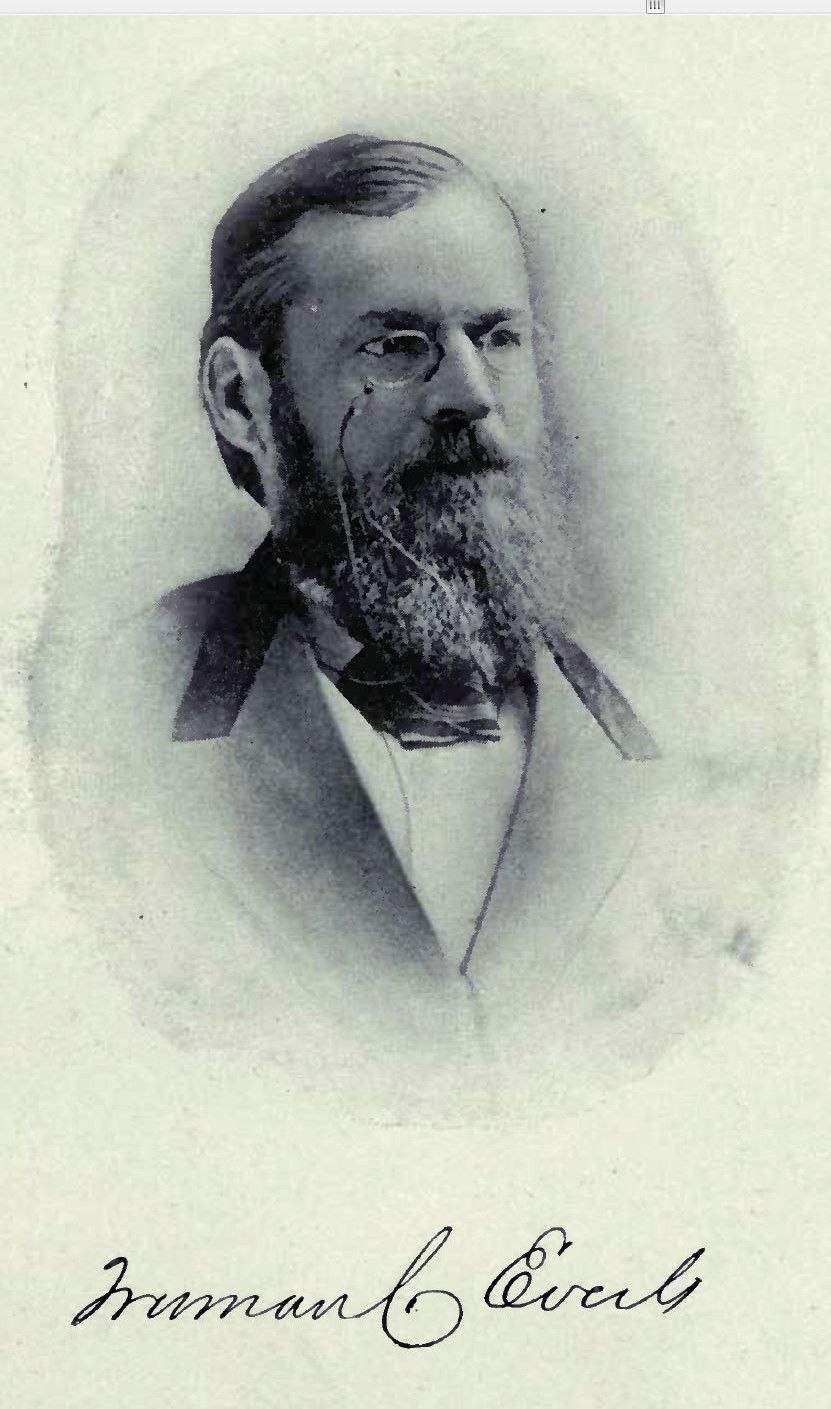
- Photo of Everts published in The Discovery of Yellowstone Park (1870)
- Born: c. 1816; Burlington, Vermont
- Died: February 16, 1901 (aged 84–85); Hyattsville, Maryland
- Occupations: Assessor of Internal Revenue for the Montana Territory (1864–1870); U.S. Post Office in Maryland
- Known for: Washburn–Langford–Doane Expedition

Truman C. Everts (c. 1816 – February 16, 1901) was an American government official and explorer who was the first federal tax assessor for the Montana Territory and a member of the 1870 Washburn–Langford–Doane Expedition, which explored the area which later became Yellowstone National Park. He was lost in the wilderness for 37 days during the expedition and a year later wrote about his ordeal for Scribner’s Monthly. Mount Everts in Yellowstone is named after him.

== History ==
Everts was one of six brothers born in Burlington, Vermont to a Great Lakes ship captain. During the American Civil War, President Abraham Lincoln appointed Everts as assessor of Internal Revenue for the Montana Territory, a position he held between July 15, 1864 and February 16, 1870.

== "Thirty-Seven Days of Peril" ==
In 1870, Everts, a former assessor for the territory of Montana, joined an expedition led by Henry D. Washburn and Nathaniel P. Langford into the wilderness that would later become Yellowstone National Park.

After falling behind the rest of the expedition on September 9, 1870, Everts lost the packhorse which was carrying most of his supplies. Without food or equipment, he attempted to retrace the expedition's route along the southern shore of Yellowstone Lake to rejoin the expedition. Everts faced starvation, trauma, snow storms and dangerous animals. He ate the roots of thistle plants to stay alive. The plant was renamed "Everts' Thistle" after him.

During the expedition, Langford kept a diary recounting efforts to locate Everts. The expedition increased their fire and shot their guns hoping to signal Everts, to no avail. It was agreed within the expedition that if a member of the party become separated, that the man would meet the party at the southwest arm of the lake, but Everts could not be found at that location.

On October 16, more than a month after his separation from the group, two local mountain men – "Yellowstone Jack" Baronett and George A. Pritchett – found Everts, suffering from frostbite, burn wounds from thermal vents and his campfire, and other injuries suffered during his ordeal, so malnourished he weighed only 90 pounds (41 kg). Baronett and Pritchett were part of a search party which had been sent from Montana to find Everts' remains. They discovered him, mumbling and delirious, more than 50 miles (80 km) from where he had first become lost. One man stayed with Everts to nurse him back to health while the other walked 75 miles (121 km) for help.

Everts' rescuers brought him to Bozeman, where he recovered. The next year, Everts' personal account of the experience, "Thirty-Seven Days of Peril", was published in Scribner’s Monthly. The story of his survival became national news and contributed a great deal of publicity to the movement to preserve the Yellowstone area as the country's first national park. In spite of their assistance, Everts denied Baronett and Pritchett payment of the reward, claiming he could have made it out of the mountains on his own.

Henry D. Washburn, as surveyor general of Montana, named a peak near Mammoth Hot Springs "Mount Everts" shortly after Everts' rescue. During the expedition, Washburn had named a peak in the Thorofare region south of Yellowstone Lake for Everts, but later changed it to the current peak, believing it to be near the location of the rescue. In fact Everts was rescued much farther north, near Blacktail Deer Creek.

== Later years ==
After the two expeditions and the fame from his article, Everts was offered the position of first superintendent of the newly established Yellowstone National Park, but he declined since it did not include a salary. He later moved to Hyattsville, Maryland and worked in the U.S. Post Office. He died there in 1901, in his home, of pneumonia.

== See also ==
- List of solved missing person cases (pre-1950)
