= Meiggs Wharf =

Former wooden pier in San Francisco

Coordinates: 37.809141°N 122.413668°W

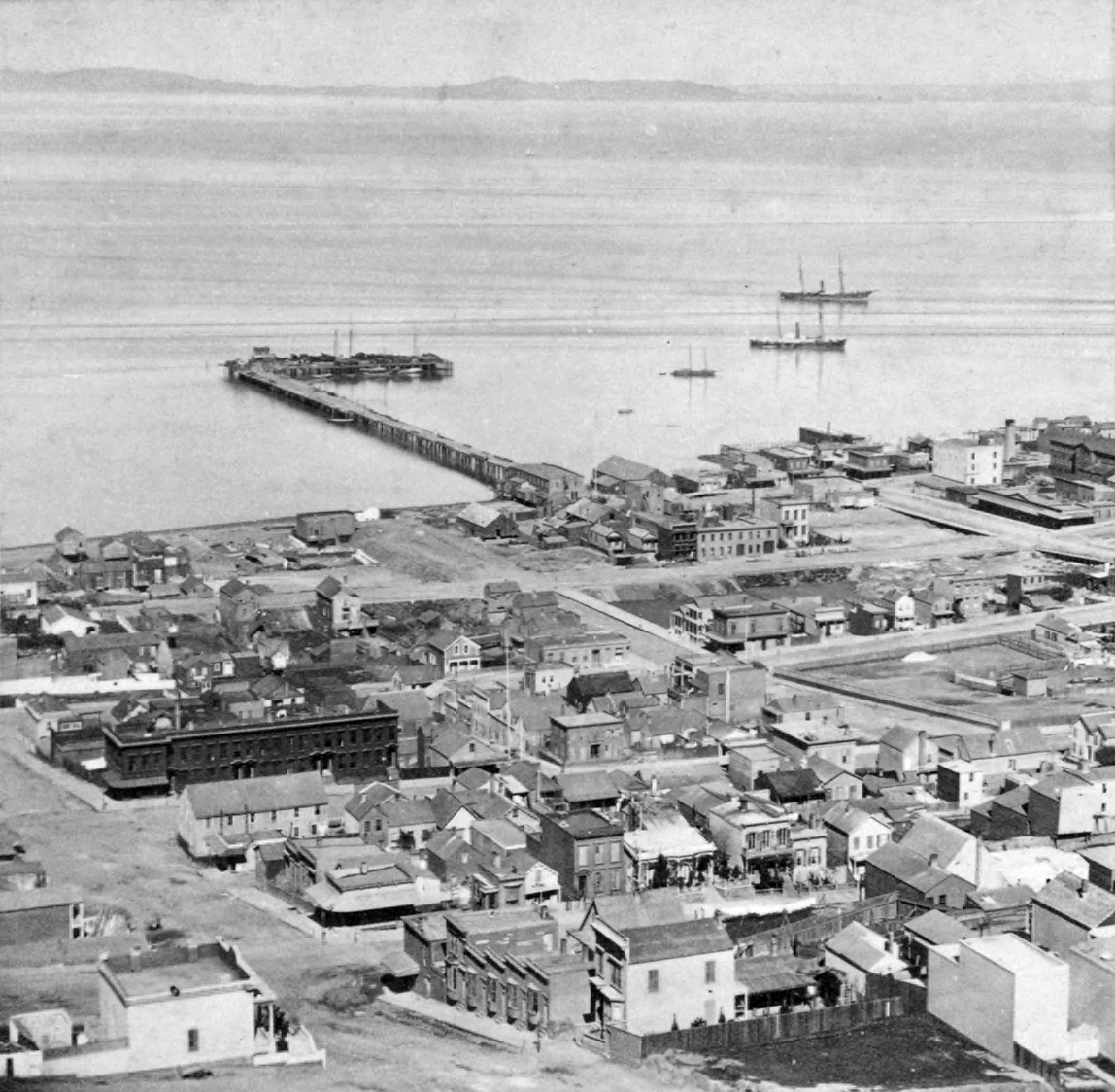
Meiggs Wharf seen from Russian Hill

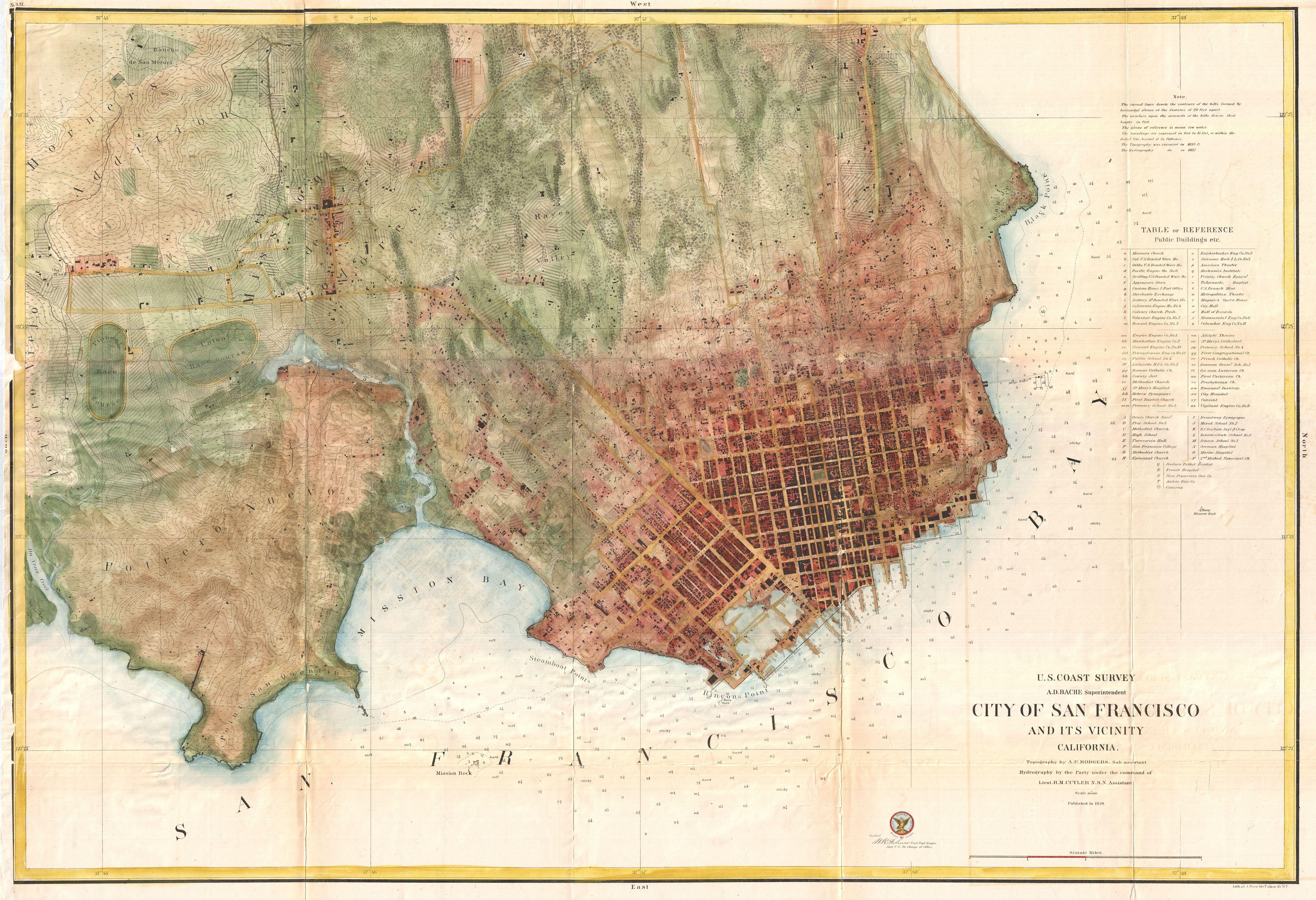
'Meigs Wharf' is on the center right, below Black Point

Meiggs' Wharf (also known as Meigs Wharf and Meiggs' Pier) was an L-shaped wooden pier extending between 1,600 and 2,000 feet (490 and 610 m) from the northern San Francisco shoreline, an exceptional distance for its time. It was built by transplanted Bostonian Henry Meiggs to attract the lumber shipping trade as part of his real estate development plans for what would become the North Beach area of San Francisco. Though it bankrupted him in the process, it would become a major part of North Beach and San Francisco society life.

== Pier ==
The pier was exceptionally long for its day, regarded by many as built in the wrong place: currents and tides ran strong at the northern tip of San Francisco off North Beach, and ships at dock were not protected by a breakwater as they were further inside San Francisco Bay at the Embarcadero. Most ships preferred the quieter waters and sailed on to safer berths there.

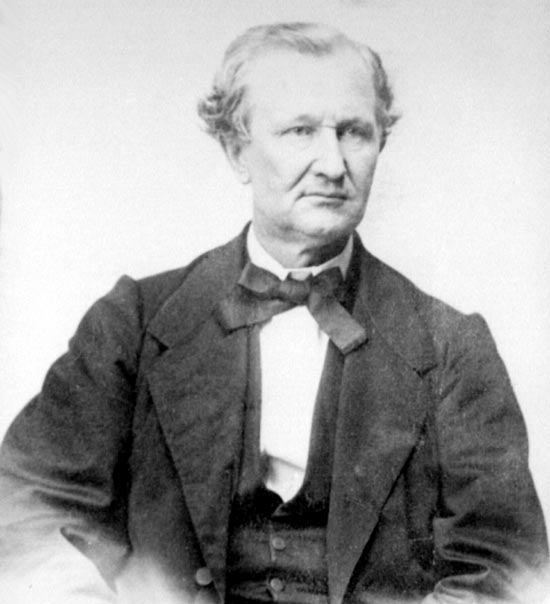
Henry Meiggs

Anchored between north-south Mason and Powell Streets and a bit north of where east-west Bay Street (the old beach frontage) now runs, Meiggs' Wharf stretched at least 1,600 feet (490 m) and possibly as much as 2,000 feet (610 m) into the bay. This is some 200 feet (60 m) further out than today's Fisherman's Wharf.

Financially, Meiggs' pier and its associated real estate developments ruined Meiggs. The "Father of North Beach", tried to cover his shortfalls with illicitly obtained warrants against the San Francisco Street Fund. Before his fraud was discovered he fled on October 6, 1854 on his brig America with his family and brother, John Meiggs, the newly elected City Controller. He landed in Chile, where after losing $8,000 in stake money and pawning his pocket watch he would make another large fortune building Chilean and Peruvian railroads. Meiggs would use a part of his new wealth to repay victims of the fraud.

After Meiggs' flight in 1854 the pier was left without an owner. Local merchant Abraham Warner opened the Cobweb Palace saloon and eatery in 1856 at the foot of the wharf. Stuffed with curios, it proved successful and served as an early social gathering spot for the entire city regardless of class. The pier became the southern terminus for the ferry to Marin County. The wharf itself survived until it burned to the water on the second day of the conflagration that devastated San Francisco after the 1906 earthquake.

Over time, the North Beach area expanded and became a thriving part of San Francisco, bearing out Meiggs' hopeful vision of the area.
