= List of Travel Channel original programming =

This is a list of programs currently and previously broadcast by Travel Channel, an American cable television network devoted to travel.

== Former programming ==
- Great Getaway Game (1989-1990)
- Great Sports Vacations (1989-1998)
- Rendezvous (1991-1994)
- Ticket to Paradise (1992)
- End of the Road (1993)
- Railway Adventures Across Europe (1993)
- Mysterious Places with Stacy Keach (1994-1997)
- Africa's Big Five (1995)
- Hit the Deck! (1996)
- Trailblazers (1998)
- Journeys to Remember (1999)
- Travel Channel World's Best (2000-2003)
- Vacation SOS (2000-2003)
- Curious World (2001)
- Great Hotels (2001-2006)
- Weird Travels (2001-2006)
- Mysterious Journeys (2002, 2007)
- Vegas Challenge (2002-2004)
- World of Mysteries (2002-2003)
- World's Best Beaches (2002)
- Get Packing (2003-2004)
- Lonely Planet Six Degrees (2003, 2006-2007, 2011-2012)
- World Poker Tour (2003-2008, moved to Game Show Network)
- Made in America (2004-2008)
- Passport to Europe (2004-2006)
- Road Trip (2004)
- Ultimate Survival: Everest (2004)
- 5 Takes (2005-2006)
- Anthony Bourdain: No Reservations (2005-2012)
- Are You Game? (2005)
- Distant Shores (2005, 2008)
- Stranded with Cash Peters (2005-2006)
- Taste of America (2005-2007)
- Bizarre Foods with Andrew Zimmern (2006-2008)
- Cash & Treasures (2006-2009)
- Drew Carey's Sporting Adventures (2006)
- Flight Attendant School (2006)
- Fred Willard's American Festivals (2006)
- Local Flavor with Joan Cusack (2006)
- Not Your Average Travel Guide (2006-2009)
- This Job's a Trip! (2006)
- 1,000 Places to See Before You Die (2007)
- Culture Shock (2007)
- Food Paradise (2007-2022)
- Mark & Olly: Living with the Tribes (2007-2009)
- Meet the Natives (2007)
- Passport to Green Getaways (2007)
- Passport to Latin America (2007)
- Tribal Life: Meet the Namal (2007)
- Forbes Luxe 11 (2008)
- Ghost Adventures (2008-2021, moved to Discovery+)
- Lawrence of America (2008)
- Man v. Food (2008-2012, 2017-2019)
- Samantha Brown's Great Weekends (2008-2013)
- Super Swank (2008)
- Treasure Hunter: Kirsten Gum (2008-2009)
- Vegas Revolution (2008)
- World's Lost Tribes (2008)
- Bite Me with Dr. Mike (2009)
- Bridget's Sexiest Beaches (2009)
- Cruises We Love! (2009)
- Dhani Tackles the Globe (2009-2010)
- Extreme (2009-2012)
- Bert the Conqueror (2010-2016)
- Chowdown Countdown (2010)
- Food Wars (2010)
- Mysteries at the Museum (2010-2019)
- When Vacations Attack (2010-2012)
- The Dead Files (2011-2023)
- The Layover (2011-2013)
- Off Limits (2011-2013)
- Sand Masters (2011-2012)
- Triple Rush (2011)
- Truck Stop Missouri (2011-2012)
- The Wild Within (2011)
- Adam Richman's Best Sandwich in America (2012)
- Airport 24/7: Miami (2012-2013)
- Amazing Eats (2012)
- Baggage Battles (2012-2016)
- Bizarre Collections (2012)
- Bizarre Foods America (2012-2014)
- Burger Land (2012-2013)
- Hotel Impossible (2012-2017)
- Insane Coaster Wars (2012-2014)
- Man v. Food Nation (2012)
- Slice of Brooklyn (2012)
- Top Spot (2012)
- Toy Hunter (2012-2014)
- Trip Flip (2012-2015)
- Xtreme Waterparks (2012-2017)
- Rock My RV with Bret Michaels (2013)
- America Declassified (2013-2014)
- Edge of America (2013)
- Mysteries at the Monument (2013-2016)
- Booze Traveler (2014-2018)
- Church Secrets & Legends (2014)
- Mysteries at the Castle (2014-2016)
- Mysteries at the Hotel (2014)
- World's Most Extreme (2014, 2018)
- Metropolis (2015)
- Mysteries at the National Parks (2015)
- The Zimmern List (2016-2019)
- Weird America (2017)
- Mysteries and Myths with Megan Fox (2018)
- Alien Highway (2019)
- Code of the Wild (2019)
- Destination Fear (2019-2023)
- Famously Afraid (2019)
- Ghost Adventures: Serial Killer Spirits (2019)
- Ghost Brothers: Haunted Houseguests (2019)
- Ghost Loop (2019-2020)
- Ghost Nation (2019-2021)
- Ghosts of Morgan City (2019)
- The Holzer Files (2019-2021)
- Hometown Horror (2019)
- Kindred Spirits (2019-2023, previously aired on Destination America)
- Lost in the Wild (2019-2020)
- Lost Secrets (2019)
- Most Terrifying Places (2019)
- Mountain Monsters (2019-2022, previously aired on Destination America)
- My Horror Story (2019)
- Paranormal Caught on Camera (2019-2024)
- Portals to Hell (2019-2022)
- Expedition Bigfoot (2019-2022)
- Ripley's Believe It or Not! (2019)
- Strange World (2019)
- Trending Fear (2019-2020)
- Witches of Salem (2019)
- The Alaska Triangle, (2020-2021)
- Buried Worlds with Don Wildman (2020)
- Doomsday Caught on Camera (2020)
- Ghost Adventures: Quarantine (2020)
- Haunting in the Heartland (2020)
- Hotel Paranormal (2020-2021)
- Into the Unknown (2020)
- Mummy Mysteries (2020)
- The Osbournes Want to Believe (2020-2021)
- Shock Docs (2020-2023)
- True Terror with Robert Englund (2020)
- Eli Roth Presents: A Ghost Ruined My Life (2021-2023)
- Extreme Paranormal Witness (2021)
- Fright Club (2021-2022)
- Eli Roth Presents: My Possessed Pet (2022)
- The Ghost Town Terror (2022)
- Urban Legend (2022)
- Vampires in America (2022)
- Eli Roth Presents: The Legion of Exorcists (2023)
- Jack Osbourne's Night of Terror (2023)
- Appalachian Stories
- Great Park Adventures, hosted by Russell Shimooka, shows adventures at North American national parks

== Acquired Programming ==
- Globe Trekker
- Madventures
- Most Haunted
- Surf Patrol
- Vacation Home Search
- World's Most Dangerous Places

== Original Films ==
- Dream Riders (2008)
