= List of television programs: M =

Alphabetically indexed lists of television programs
0–9	A	B	C	D	E	F	G	H	I–J
K–L	M	N	O	P	Q–R	S	T	U–V–W	X–Y–Z

This is an alphabetical list of television program articles (or sections within articles about television programs). Spaces and special characters are ignored. This list covers television programs whose first letter of the title is M.

M

== MA ==
- MacGyver (1985)
- MacGyver (2016)
- Mack & Moxy
- Mackenzie's Raiders
- Mac Miller and the Most Dope Family
- Mad
- Mad About You
- Mad Men
- Mad TV
- Madam Secretary
- Made
- Made for Love
- Made in Chelsea (UK)
- Madeline
- Maggie (UK, 1981)
- Maggie (US, 1981)
- Maggie (US, 1998)
- Maggie (US, 2022)
- Maggie & Bianca: Fashion Friends
- Maggie and the Ferocious Beast
- Magical Girl Site (Japan)
- Magnum, P.I. (1980)
- Magnum, P.I. (2018)
- Mahou Sentai Magiranger
- Maid Sama!
- Maisie Raine
- Maji de Watashi ni Koishinasai!
- Major Crimes (TV series)
- Major Dad
- Majority Rules!
- Make the Grade
- Make It or Break It
- Make It Pop
- Make Room for Daddy
- Make Room for Granddaddy
- Make Way for Noddy
- Makin' It (sitcom)
- Making It (reality competition series)
- Making a Murderer
- Making Fiends
- Making Sense of the Sixties
- Making the Band
- Making the Video
- Malcolm in the Middle
- Malibu Country
- Malu Mulher (Brazil)
- Mama Mirabelle's Home Movies
- Mama's Family
- Man About the House
- A Man Called Hawk (1989)
- The Man and the Challenge
- The Man and the City
- Man from Atlantis
- The Man from U.N.C.L.E.
- Man in a Suitcase
- A Man in Full
- Man with a Plan
- Man Seeking Woman
- The Man Show
- Man of the World
- Man v. Food
- Man vs. Wild
- Man, Woman, Wild
- Manhattan
- Manhunt: Deadly Games
- Manhattan Love Story
- Manhunt (1959)
- Manhunt (1969)
- Manhunt (2001)
- Manhunt (2004)
- Manhunt (2024)
- Maniac Mansion
- Manifest
- Manimal
- Mannix
- MANswers
- The Many Loves of Dobie Gillis
- Manzo'd with Children
- Marcus Welby, M.D.
- Mariah's World
- Mark Twain
- Mark Wright's Hollywood Nights (British)
- Marlon
- Marriage Boot Camp
- Married... with Children
- Married by America
- Married to the Army: Alaska
- Married at First Sight (Australia)
- Married at First Sight (UK)
- Married at First Sight (US)
- Married to Jonas
- Married to Medicine
- Married to Medicine: Houston
- Married to Rock
- Marry Him If You Dare (South Korea)
- Marshall Law
- The Martha Stewart Show
- Martha Speaks
- Martial Law
- Martin
- Martin Kane, Private Eye
- Marvin Marvin
- Martin Mystery
- Marvin the Tap-Dancing Horse
- The Marvelous Misadventures of Flapjack
- The Marvelous Mrs. Maisel
- Mary (1978)
- Mary (1985)
- Mary Hartman, Mary Hartman
- Mary + Jane
- Mary Kay and Johnny
- Mary, Mungo and Midge (British)
- The Mary Tyler Moore Hour
- The Mary Tyler Moore Show
- Masha and the Bear
- Masha's Spooky Stories
- Masha's Tales
- The Masked Dancer
- Masked Singer
  - King of Mask Singer (South Korea)
  - The Masked Singer (US)
- Masquerade
- Masquerade Party
- M*A*S*H
- M.A.S.K. (Mobile Armored Strike Kommand)
- Master of None
- MasterChef (UK)
- MasterChef (US)
- MasterChef Australia
- MasterChef Canada
- MasterChef Junior
- MasterChef USA
- Mastermind (UK)
- Masterminds (Canada)
- Masterminds (US)
- Masterpiece Theatre
- Masters of Horror
- Masters of the Air
- Masters of the Maze
- Masters of Sex
- Match Game
- Match Game-Hollywood Squares Hour
- Match of the Day (British)
- Maternidade
- Matlock (1986 TV series)
- Matlock (2024 TV series)
- Matt Hatter Chronicles
- Matt Houston
- Maude
- Maury
- Maverick
- Max Headroom
- Maxie's World
- Max & Shred
- Max Steel
- The Maxx
- Mayberry R.F.D.
- May to December (British)
- The Mayor
- Max & Ruby
- Maya & Miguel
- Maya the Bee

== MC ==
- McCloud
- McHale's Navy
- The McLaughlin Group
- McLeod's Daughters
- McMillan & Wife
- McMorris & McMorris

== ME ==
- Me and My Monsters
- Me and the Chimp
- Meatballs and Spaghetti
- Me, Myself & I
- Mech-X4
- Medical Center
- Medical Examiner Dr. Qin (China)
- Medical Investigation
- Medici
- Medium
- Meerkat Manor
- Meet the Browns
- Meet Millie
- Meet the Peetes
- Meet the Press (Australia)
- Meet the Press (US)
- MegaMan NT Warrior
- Mega Babies
- Mega Man
- Mega Man: Fully Charged
- Megan Wants a Millionaire
- Megasztár (Hungary)
- Megas XLR
- Megyn Kelly Today
- Melissa & Joey
- Melody Rules
- Melrose Place (1992)
- Melrose Place (2009)
- Men Behaving Badly
- Men in Trees
- Men With Brooms
- Men, Women & Dogs
- The Mentalist
- The Meredith Vieira Show
- Merlin
- The Merv Griffin Show
- Metal Mickey
- Metalocalypse
- Method & Red
- Mew Mew Power
- Mexico's Next Top Model

== MI ==
- Miami Ink
- Miami Social
- Miami Vice
- The Michael J. Fox Show
- The Mick
- Mickey Mouse
- The Mickey Mouse Club
- Mickey Mouse Clubhouse
- Mickey Mouse Funhouse
- Mickey Mouse Works
- Mickey and the Roadster Racers
- Mickey Spillane's Mike Hammer
- The Middle
- The Middleman
- Middlemost Post
- @midnight
- Midnight Caller
- The Midnight Special
- Midnight, Texas
- Midsomer Murders
- Miffy's Adventures Big and Small
- The Mighty B!
- The Mighty Boosh
- Mighty Ducks
- Mighty Express (Canada)
- Mighty Machines
- Mighty Magiswords
- Mighty Max
- Mighty Med
- Mighty Mike
- Mighty Morphin Power Rangers
- Mighty Morphin Alien Rangers
- Mike the Knight
- Mike Tyson Mysteries
- Mike & Mike
- Mike & Molly
- Mike, Lu, and Og
- Miles from Tomorrowland
- MILF Manor
- Millennium
- A Million Little Things
- Milo Murphy's Law
- The Millionaire
- The Millionaire Matchmaker
- Million Dollar Listing
  - Million Dollar Listing Los Angeles
  - Million Dollar Listing Miami
  - Million Dollar Listing New York
  - Million Dollar Listing San Francisco
  - Million Dollar Listing UAE
- Million Dollar Minute (Australia)
- Million Dollar Quartet
- The Million Second Quiz
- The Milton Berle Show
- Milly, Molly
- Minder
- Mind Field
- Mindhunter
- Mind Your Language
- Minx
- The Mindy Project
- Minga y Petraca (Puerto Rico)
- Ministry Of Mayhem
- Minnie's Bow-Toons
- Minute to Win It
  - Minute to Win It (US)
- Mio Mao
- Miraculous: Tales of Ladybug & Cat Noir
- Mirada de mujer, el regreso (Mexico)
- Miranda
- The Misadventures of Sheriff Lobo (later Lobo)
- Mira, Royal Detective
- Misfits
- Misfits of Science
- Miss BG
- Miss Fisher's Murder Mysteries
- Miss Kobayashi's Dragon Maid
- Miss Marple
- Miss Match
- Miss Moon (France)
- Miss Farah
- Miss Spider's Sunny Patch Friends
- Missing Crown Prince
- Mission Hill (TV series)
- Mission: Impossible
- The Mist (2017)
- Mister Ed
- Mister Maker
- Mister Peepers
- Mister Roberts
- Mister Rogers' Neighborhood
- Mister Terrific
- Mistresses (UK)
- Mistresses (US)
- Mixels
- Mix Master
- Mix Master: Final Force
- Mixology
- Miyuki
- Miz & Mrs.

== MO ==
- Mo
- The Mob Doctor
- Mobile One
- Mobile Suit Gundam
- Mobile Suit Gundam 0083: Stardust Memory
- Mobile Suit Gundam ZZ
- Mobile Suit Victory Gundam
- Mobile Suit Zeta Gundam
- Mob Psycho 100
- Mobsters
- Mob Wives
- Mob Wives Chicago
- Mob Wives: The Sit Down
- Model Squad
- Models Inc.
- Modern Marvels
- Modern Men
- Modern Family
- The Mod Squad
- Moesha
- The Mole
- Molly of Denali
- Mom
- Mom’s Got Game
- Mona the Vampire
- Monday Night Baseball
- Monday Night Countdown
- Monday Night Football
- Money for Nothing
- Monica the Medium
- Monk
- Monk Little Dog
- Monkey
- The Monkees
- Monopoly
- The Monroes (1966)
- The Monroes (1995)
- Monsieur Spade
- Monsters
- Monsters at Work
- Monsters vs. Aliens
- Monster Allergy
- Monster Buster Club
- Monster Farm
- Monster Garage
- The Monster Kid
- Monster Mania
- Monster Math Squad
- MonsterQuest
- The Montel Williams Show
- Monty Python's Flying Circus
- Moon Knight
- Moonlight
- Moonlighting
- The Moonstone (1972)
- Moon Unit
- Mork & Mindy
- Mortal Kombat: Conquest
- Most Haunted
- Most Haunted Live!
- Mother Up!
- Moral Orel
- More Colorful
- Motherland: Fort Salem
- Motive (Canada)
- MotorSport Ranch (TV series)
- Motu Patlu
- The Mothers-in-Law
- The Mouse and the Monster
- Moving Up
- Mozart in the Jungle

== MR ==
- Mr. Adams and Eve
- Mr. Bean
- Mr. Bean: The Animated Series
- Mr. Belvedere
- Mr Benn (British)
- Mr. D (Canada)
- Mr. Magoo
- Mr. Mayor
- Mr. Meaty
- The Mr. Men Show
- Mr. Mercedes
- Mr. & Mrs. Smith
- Mr. Novak
- The Mr. Peabody & Sherman Show
- Mr. Personality
- Mr. Robot
- The Mr. Science Show
- Mr Selfridge
- Mr Shalash's Family
- Mr. Show
- Mr. Sloane (UK)
- Mr. Sunshine
- Mr. Wizard's World
- Mr. Young
- Mrs. Eastwood & Company

== MS ==
- Ms. Marvel

== MT ==
- MTV Cribs
- MTV Unplugged
- MTV's The 70s House

== MU ==
- ¡Mucha Lucha!
- Mudpit
- Mujer, Casos de la Vida Real (Mexico)
- Mukta (India)
- The Mullets
- Multi-Coloured Swap Shop (UK)
- The Munsters
- Muppet Babies (1984-2001)
- Muppet Babies (2018-)
- The Muppet Show
- Muppets Tonight
- A Murder at the End of the World
- Murder, She Wrote
- Murdoch Mysteries
- Murphy Brown
- Music City
- Music Feed
- The Musketeers (BBC)
- Must Love Kids
- Mutant X
- Mutt & Stuff

== MX ==
- MXC

== MY ==
- My Adventures with Superman
- My Babysitter's a Vampire (Canada)
- My Big Fat American Gypsy Wedding
- My Big Fat Fabulous Life
- My Big Fat Greek Life
- My Big Fat Gypsy Wedding
- My Big Fat Obnoxious Boss
- My Big Fat Obnoxious Fiance
- My Big Redneck Wedding
- My Boys
- My Brother and Me
- My Dad the Rock Star
- My Fab 40th
- My Fair Brady
- My Family
- My Family's Got Guts
- My Favorite Husband
- My Favorite Martian
- My Friend Flicka
- My Friend Rabbit
- My Friends Tigger & Pooh
- My Goldfish Is Evil!
- My Gym Partner's a Monkey
- My Hero Academia
- My Hero Academia: Vigilantes
- My House, Your Money
- My Kitchen Rules (Australia)
- My Kitchen Rules (US)
- My Kitchen Rules NZ (New Zealand)
- My Knight and Me
- My Life as a Teenage Robot
- My Life as a Video Game
- My Life Me
- My Little Pony
- My Little Pony: Friendship Is Magic
- My Lottery Dream Home
- My Mother the Car
- My Name Is Earl
- My Pet Monster
- My Secret Identity
- My Sister Eileen
- My Sister Sam
- My So-Called Life
- My Strange Addiction
- My Strange Arrest
- My Super Sweet 16
- My Teen Romantic Comedy SNAFU
- My Three Sons
- My Two Dads
- My Wife and Kids
- My World and Welcome to It
- Mysteries at the Castle
- Mysteries at the Hotel
- Mysteries at the Monument
- Mysteries at the Museum
- Mysteries at the National Parks
- The Mysterious Benedict Society
- The Mysterious Cities of Gold (1982)
- The Mysterious Cities of Gold (2012)
- The Mysteries of Laura
- Mysterious Ways
- Mystery Diagnosis
- Mystery Diners
- Mystery Girls
- Mystery Hunters
- Mystery and Imagination
- MysteryQuest
- Mystery Science Theater 3000
- MythBusters
- MythBusters: The Search
- Mysticons

Previous: List of television programs: K-L Next: List of television programs: N
