= Philly (dog) =

American military dog

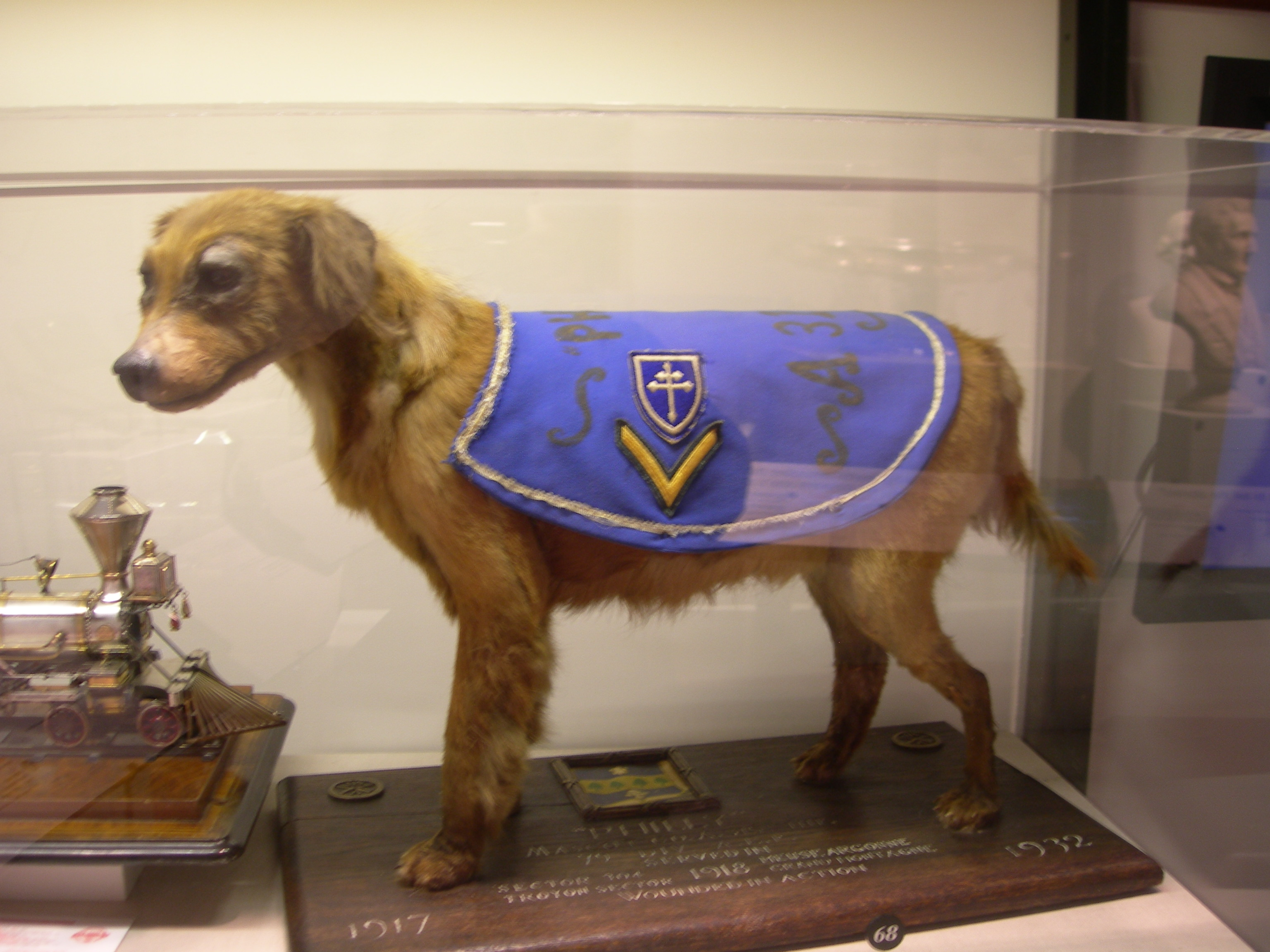
- Philly at the Philadelphia History Museum

Philly (1917 – 1932) was a stray female dog who served on the front lines of World War I with Company A of the 315 Infantry, 79th Division. Smuggled into France, she served at Montfaucon, Nantillois, Troyon and LaGrande Montagne before returning to the United States. Her ability as a guard dog made her a heroine of the troops and resulted in a bounty of 50 deutschemarks on her head by the Germans. She participated in the victory parade and lived until 1932. Following her death, she was mounted and remained at the 315th's headquarters until its disbandment in 1995. Philly was donated to the Philadelphia History Museum and has occasionally been on display for the viewing public.

== Life ==
Philly was a stray mixed breed dog that served with Company A of the 315th Infantry of the 79th Division in World War I. On September 27, 1917, she was found by a soldier returning from Camp Meade and became the mascot of Company A. The dog was smuggled on board when it came time for the unit's deployment and was shipped to France, where she saw action at Montfaucon, Nantillois, Troyon and LaGrande Montagne.

Throughout her service, she was wounded and gassed, but proved to be a capable guard dog. Her warnings of German sneak attacks resulted in a bounty of 50 deutschemarks for her death and her being hailed a hero of the American soldiers. While in France, she also gave birth to four pups. After the war was won, Philly marched with the 315th in the victory parade.

== Death and afterwards ==
In 1932, Philly died at the age of 15. Herman, who had intended to have her mounted, was unemployed and buried Philly under the driveway. After learning of her fate, the members of the 315th exhumed the body and paid a taxidermist to mount Philly. The dog went missing in the intervening years and the unit made a search for her in 1967, the unit's 50th anniversary. After being recovered, she remained in the battalion commander's office until the division's disbandment in 1995; she was then donated to the Philadelphia History Museum. Before arriving at the Museum, Philly was taken to the taxidermist for work.

In 1997, Beryl Rosenstock stated that Philly is not on permanent exhibition, stating, "[Philly] had to be removed because the heat of the overhead spotlights was beginning to discolor her already fading hair."

Philly stands 16 inches (0.41 m) high, and her back is covered with a small blue blanket with insignia of the 79th Infantry Division above a gold chevron denoting the rank of private.

== Legacy ==
Philly was featured in Norman Rockwell's Wartime: Illustrations.

Philly was featured in Mystery at the Museum.

== See also ==
- List of individual dogs § War dogs
