= Wolf Creek Inn State Heritage Site =

State park in Oregon, United States

- Location within Oregon Location within the United States
- Type: Public, state
- Location: Josephine County, Oregon
- Nearest city: Grants Pass
- Coordinates: 42°41′43″N 123°23′46″W
- Operator: Oregon Parks and Recreation Department
- Website: https://www.wolfcreekinn.com
- Wolf Creek Tavern
- U.S. National Register of Historic Places
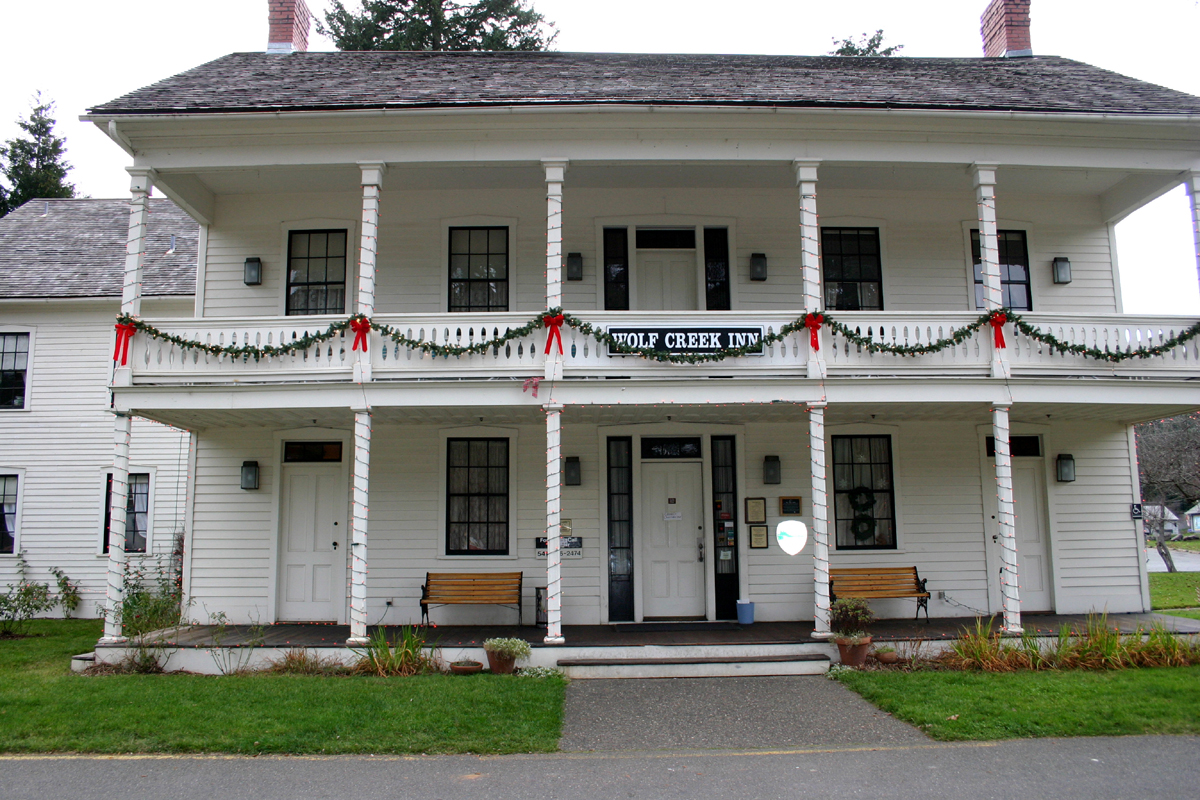
- Location: Wolf Creek, Oregon
- Built: 1883
- Architect: Henry McIntosh, et al., Lewis Vaughn
- Architectural style: Classical Revival
- NRHP reference No.: 72001081
- Added to NRHP: September 22, 1972

Wolf Creek Inn State Heritage Site is a state park in the U.S. state of Oregon, administered by the Oregon Parks and Recreation Department.

== History ==
The Wolf Creek Inn was built along the Applegate Trail in 1883 for Henry Smith, a local entrepreneur. It is the oldest continuously operating inn in the Pacific Northwest, and is the site where author Jack London completed his novel Valley of the Moon. The inn also housed actors from the early days of Hollywood when they wanted to escape from the film studios. Celebrities Clark Gable, Carole Lombard, and Orson Welles stayed at the inn.

== Today ==
It was added to the National Register of Historic Places as Wolf Creek Tavern in 1972. The inn was acquired by the Oregon Parks and Recreation Department in 1975. The tavern/restaurant and inn are still in operation.

== In the media ==
=== On television ===
In 2014, the Wolf Creek Inn was featured on the TV series Mysteries at the Hotel (broadcast as Hotel Secrets & Legends) as a haunted location. The Wolf Creek Inn was also featured as a lockdown location on a season 15 episode of Ghost Adventures on the Travel Channel, where the crew investigated its many claims of paranormal activity.

== See also ==
- List of Oregon state parks
