= Mysteries at the National Parks =

- Genre: Documentary; Reality
- Created by: Adam Wanderer
- Developed by: Adam Wanderer
- Written by: Lewis Cohen; Gary Lang; Leo Singer
- Directed by: Lewis Cohen; Leo Singer; Eric Blouin
- Narrated by: Ross Huguet
- Opening theme: Jingle Punks
- Composers: Killer Tracks; Fristcom Music
- Country of origin: United States
- Original language: English
- No. of seasons: 1

Production
- Executive producer: Arnie Gelbart
- Producer: Gregory Fine
- Cinematography: Neil Oakscott; Robert Vroom
- Editors: Maxime Chalifoux; Chantal Lussier
- Running time: 30 minutes
- Production companies: Galafim Productions; Blue Ant Media

Original release
- Network: Travel Channel
- Release: May 1 – May 22, 2015

Related
- Mysteries at the Museum; Mysteries at the Monument; Mysteries at the Castle; Church Secrets & Legends; Mysteries at the Hotel

Mysteries at the National Parks is an American reality television series that premiered on May 1, 2015, on the Travel Channel. The series features the secrets and legends in National Parks across the United States. Episodes air on Fridays at 9:00 p.m. EST.

== Premise ==
Each half-hour episode includes interviews with historians, scientists, authors, and paranormal investigators, as well as dramatic recreations featuring actors re-telling haunting stories of the unexplained, mysteries and legends from the most famous of America's national parks.

== Episodes ==
No.	Title	Original release date
1	"Nazi UFO's"	May 1, 2015
In the series premiere, Montana's Glacier National Park is explored for evidence that a missile launch command center was used as a secret underground Nazi base during the Cold War that historians suspect was used for building advanced aircraft such as flying saucers. So, it was no surprise both military and civilians alike reported UFO sightings in the area. Also, the conspiracy of Adolf Hitler being alive after his defeat during World War II is examined at the park’s Lake McDonald Lodge at Lake McDonald, which could have been where the führer spent his final days hiding out with the help of his right-hand-man, SS Colonel Otto Skorzeny, who is said to have secretly brought him there.
2	"Haunted Battleground"	May 1, 2015
Gettysburg National Military Park in Gettysburg, Pennsylvania, is said the fighting was so intense and bloody in the Battle of Gettysburg, it transformed the 4,000 acres into a hotbed of paranormal activity, with hundreds of ghosts sightings reported every year. Not only is the park investigated for evidence of ghost soldiers still roaming the battlefields, it explains how the land was a battle ground for Native American tribal battles between the Iroquois and local Indians centuries before the Civil War. Also, a secret U.S. government time travel experiment that was allegedly conducted on the site with the help of the area’s abundance of quartz crystal as a conductor of electromagnetic energy is exposed.
3	"Chupacabra Island"	May 8, 2015
El Yunque National Forest in Puerto Rico, famous for the folklore of El Chupacabra, has also been the site locals and visitors alike have reported UFO sightings in the same places where this hybrid creature has been spotted. This causes many researchers to theorize that these extraterrestrial stories could be a part of a secret U.S. government research facility in the area, which could be running a disinformation campaign to help maintain secrecy about their experimental activities.
4	"The Land of the Lost"	May 8, 2015
Mysterious disappearances, a bizarre death, and supernatural encounters at Northern California's Mount Shasta in Shasta-Trinity National Forest are linked to the Karuk Indian legend of the "Big People" or Lemurians, a race of super humans from the destroyed city of Lemuria who now live above the tree line. These dark forces of theirs might have led to hundreds of unexplained incidents in the area, including the disappearance of an elderly woman, the luring away of a little boy from his family by an entity posing as his grandmother, and the tragic death of a teenager that left his parents devastated.
5	"Ape Man and Aliens"	May 15, 2015
A Bigfoot-like creature locals call "Yucca Man]", UFO sightings near the mysterious Big Rock, and alien abductions that conduct genetic experiments on humans are investigated at California's Joshua Tree National Park. Located in the Mojave Desert, the park is famed for being a hotbed of UFO activity believed to be a magnet for alleged sightings and extraterrestrial encounters, as well as, being home of the Integratron, a domed-building designed by engineer George Van Tassel on the instructions of the alien species, the Anunnaki from his encounter with them at the park in 1953.
6	"Firestarter"	May 15, 2015
Hawaii Volcanoes National Park on the Big Island of Hawaii, home to the famous Mount Kīlauea attracts visitors from all over the world and strange forces caused by ley lines. Tourists, park rangers and locals alike have all reported paranormal incidents of a vengeful goddess, floating fireballs, and black magic at play. One vacationer's life goes into a downward spiral after taking a collection of lava rocks and sand back home, while two hikers mysterious deaths lead some to believe a curse killed them. Also a native Hawaiian has a face-to-face encounter with Madame Pele, the protector of the land, who protected him from a car accident.
7	"Portal to the Underworld"	May 22, 2015
A park ranger's report of ghosts has ties to a deadly commercial airplane collision at the Grand Canyon National Park in Arizona. The planes crashed at a mysterious area of two rivers meet, called "the confluence", where half a century earlier, explorer G.E. Kincaid climbs 1,500 treacherous feet to explore strange stairs on a canyon wall that led to his discovery of a cavern full of ancient Egyptian artifacts. And it is also where a college student and a Hopi Indian say they found a portal to a futuristic metropolis believed to be inhabited by what the Pueblo tribe described as "ant people" who helped save them from natural disasters.
8	"Flight to Hell"	May 22, 2015
The ghosts of the tragic plane crash of Eastern Airlines Flight 401, gruesome murders by two serial killers, and a python infestation that's killing all the mammals are all linked together at Everglades National Park, a sprawling swamp in the southern tip of Florida. Some believe it is a place of unseen dark power, that includes satanic worshiping by an evil secret cult known as the Hand of Death and the origin of a series of hauntings and has the power to turn good men into killers, like Edgar Watson and Henry Lee Lucas, who murdered many people on park property through the years.

== Reception ==
The series has garnered mixed reviews. Tom Conroy of Media Life Magazine says, "Mysteries at the National Parks, dumb. Travel Channel series may set a new low in junk television". Conversely, Doug Knoop of The Seattle Times says, "Mysteries at the National Parks is a TV pick for Friday."

== See also ==
List of national parks of the United States
