= Not Your Average Travel Guide =

- Not Your Average Travel Guide Logo
- Starring: Bill Delano; Brian Knappenberger; Carrie Lederer; Kate Ward; Shane O Joseph Van Harken; Brad Hasse
- Country of origin: United States
- No. of episodes: 10

Production
- Executive producers: Nina Weinstein; Sue Norton
- Running time: 22 minutes

Original release
- Network: Travel Channel
- Release: November 17, 2006 – present

Not Your Average Travel Guide (NYATG) is a travel show on the Travel Channel, it airs Saturdays at 10 p.m. and 10:30 p.m. ET/PT. It is hosted by seven different "Travel Guides", Bill Delano, Brian Knappenberger, Carrie Lederer, Kate Ward, Shane O, Joseph Van Harken, and Brad Hasse. The show features a specific city in each episode lasting approximately 30 minutes. The show attempts to give an unconventional personal tour of the world, also featured during the show are small travel tips and facts. The show debuted on November 17, 2006 at 8 p.m. ET/PT.

== History ==
While riding a bike, Shane Reynolds gave a tour of Amsterdam in the series premier that aired on November 20, 2006. The Hindustan Times said, "The show was packed with all the entertaining elements that today's young Indian traveller seeks including the best ways to travel, local munchies, must dos and must visits."

Bill Delano gave a tour of Washington, D.C. in a tour that aired in February 2007. During the Independence Day festivities, he showcased the National Mall, the National Gallery of Art, the United States Holocaust Memorial Museum.

Led by Brian Knappenberger, a February 2008 episode toured London and included stops at St Paul's Cathedral, the Tower of London, Tate Modern, and the British Museum as well as a pub crawl. Another February 2008 episode from Knappenberger explored Wimbledon, the All England Lawn Tennis and Croquet Club, and the Wimbledon Lawn Tennis Museum, and included a conversation with Jamea Jackson.

== Format ==
=== There's more History ===
A view of the historical places in the city.

=== How to get around ===
The best way to get around the city and usually most economical.

=== Meat and Potatoes ===
Places and sites everyone has to see in a city. These are usually tourist heavy places.

=== Eat Here ===
Different kinds of local food and restaurants to visit.

=== Culture Vulture ===
A local expert in the culture that shows the tour guide and viewers additional history and little know/off the beaten path locations.

=== Online on the Move ===
This segment the tour guide will go find internet access in the city, usually an internet cafe or the hotel they're staying at. Then they read posts from the official forums by viewers who have visited the location being featured, and see where the viewers think they should go and what they need to see.

=== What's Happening ===
Event's going on in the city, whether it be annually or daily.

== Reception ==
The New Straits Times said, "Providing savvy travel advice, topped with fun, wit and an adventurous spirit, viewers will be able to feel the greatness of travelling at its best through a new perspective in the series." The Courier-Mail praised the series, writing, "Rather than typical sightseeing to a popular destination, the show offers a real and accessible approach to travel and an unconventional VIP (very inter-personal) tour of the world." The Sydney Morning Herald's Doug Anderson called Not Your Average Tour Guide "a fantastic new travel series that dispenses with the usual cliches of such series and presents a range of useful and essential facts about various cities around the world."
