= This Job's a Trip! =

This Job's a Trip! is an American reality television show that aired on the Travel Channel produced by Brave St. Productions in association with Vocation Vacations. The series was written & directed by Chris Voos and aired for a single season in 2006.

== Premise ==
Episodes of This Job's a Trip! featured one male and one female participant with nothing in common except their dream job. After brief interviews, each 'job tripper' was taken from their respective locations to somewhere far away for a shared opportunity to try out their dream job. They were given a series of progressive challenges together to see if they could survive in their ideal profession or if they were better suited for their existing day job. The theme of each episode featured a different dream job and two new participants.

In an interview with Catherine Applefeld Olson of CableFax, Patrick Younge explains the show was picked up as part of an overall strategy to help define The Travel Channel as "passion-based network."

The first episode aired on April 23, 2006. The season had 13 episodes. The show spent 10 hours over three days filming an episode at the Saddleback Ranch in Steamboat Springs, Colorado. In the episode, the ranch staff taught an office manager and a computer technician how to be cattle ranchers.

== Reception ==
In a positive review, George Vernadakis of Multichannel News wrote, "This Job's a Trip is consistent with the network's broad 'travel entertainment' mandate, and should click with couch-potato travelers, as well as viewers who just hate their jobs."
