= Slice of Brooklyn =

Television series

Slice of Brooklyn is a reality television series on the Travel Channel

It features Tony Muia running his "A Slice of Brooklyn" pizza tour, visiting restaurants in Brooklyn, NY. His guests include "Frankie Pancakes", "Uncle Louie", and "Fat Sal". The show premiered March 7, 2012.
