= Mysteries at the Hotel =

American documentary TV series

- Also known as: Hotel Secrets & Legends
- Genre: Documentary, Reality
- Directed by: Patrick DeLuca; David Michael Maurer
- Narrated by: Ted Stewart
- Country of origin: United States
- Original language: English
- No. of seasons: 1
- No. of episodes: 13

Production
- Executive producers: Jim Casey, Patrick DeLuca; Kevin Sharkey
- Producers: Amy Barron, Suzy Beck, Paul Boese, Richard Monahan, Jesse Schiller, Kelly Ulmer
- Cinematography: Chris Darnell, Krist Hager, Mark Peterson
- Editors: David Michael Maurer, Peter Fitzer, Renaldo Romero, Randy D. Wiles
- Running time: 60 minutes
- Production companies: Twelve02 Television, Inc.

Original release
- Network: Travel Channel
- Release: April 6 – June 8, 2014

Related
- Mysteries at the Museum; Mysteries at the Monument; Mysteries at the Castle; Church Secrets & Legends; Mysteries at the National Parks

Mysteries at the Hotel (formerly Hotel Secrets & Legends) is an American documentary television series that premiered on Sunday, April 6, 2014, on the Travel Channel and ended on June 8, 2014. The series features the secrets and legends hidden in the rooms of the many hotels, motels and resorts in America. The episodes aired every Sunday at 10:00 pm EST.

== Premise ==
Each episode includes dramatic recreations featuring actors re-telling the most mysterious, secret and strange stories and legends from a hotel's history that they do not want their guests to find out. These stories have either have occurred inside the rooms or near America's famous and even not-so-famous hotels.

Opening Introduction: (narrated by Patrick DeLuca):

On any given night in America, two million hotel rooms are occupied. And in nearly all of them, the occupants have no clue about the secrets hidden in the hotel's past. It's time to check in to...Hotel Secrets & Legends.

== Episodes ==
No.	Title	Original release date
1	"Mad Scientist; Hollywood Scandal; Outlaw's End"	April 6, 2014
In the series premiere, the well-known inventor Nikola Tesla's room (#3327) at The New Yorker Hotel in New York City is raided by the FBI in hope to find his plans to build a death ray after he was found dead. The ghost story that inspired Stephen King's popular horror novel The Shining while staying in Room 217 at the Stanley Hotel in Estes Park, Colorado during a snowstorm on October 30, 1974 is told. The Patee House in St. Joseph, Missouri plays a major role in the legend of infamous outlaw Jesse James who was double-crossed by his own gang (Charles and Robert Ford) on April 3, 1882. The St. Francis Hotel in San Francisco, California was the scene of the "first true Hollywood scandal" when silent film comedian Fatty Arbuckle found struggling actress Virginia Rappe's dead body in his room (#1220) after throwing a wild party during the height of Prohibition. On April 5, 1865, actor and Confederate sympathizer, John Wilkes Booth plans a plot to kill President Abraham Lincoln in his room at the Parker House Hotel in Boston, Massachusetts.
2	"Deceptive Doctor; Portland Underground; Civil War Smackdown"	April 13, 2014
The Crescent Hotel in Eureka Springs, Arkansas was once the former site of a "curable-cancer" treatment hospital founded by radio host/con man Norman Baker, a self-proclaimed doctor who had a cure for cancer. The bar at the Merchants Hotel in Portland, Oregon was beneath an underworld called the Shanghai tunnels where unsuspecting patrons where they were "shanghaied" and forced into slave labor aboard sea captains ships. In September 1862, the Galt House Hotel in Louisville, Kentucky became the scene of a controversial murder, when Union General Jefferson C. Davis shot fellow Union General William "Bull" Nelson after a heated dispute. After a local House gang murders his friend John Tunstall, infamous outlaw William Bonney (aka Billy the Kid) takes revenge but gets cornered, but makes a daring escape from Ellis Store Co. Bed and Breakfast (then a general store) in Lincoln, New Mexico during the Lincoln County War. When Mammoth Cave Hotel owner Franklin Gorin opens a tourist attraction, he enlists slave Stephen Bishop to chart the rest of the Mammoth Cave National Park in southern Kentucky, helping him find his freedom underground by becoming its first tour guide and explorer.
3	"Dueling Politicians; Nuclear Intel; Seattle Scammers"	April 13, 2014
The Beekman Arms in Rhinebeck, New York sets the scene of the infamous duel between campaigning American politicians Aaron Burr and Alexander Hamilton in 1804. A man named "John Burroughs" who's really a disguised Elvis Presley packing a pistol before meeting President Richard Nixon at the White House checks into three rooms (#505, 506, 507) at the Hotel Washington in Washington D.C. in 1970. Room 231 at the City Center Motor Inn (formally the Magnuson Grand Hotel) in Bozeman, Montana was the hideout of art thief who was connected to an art heist in 2009. In 1943, David Greenglass, an atomic spy for the Soviet Union who is staying at the La Fonda Hotel in Santa Fe, New Mexico sells nuclear secrets about the Manhattan Project while working at the nearby secret compound known as "Site Y". The Alaska Building in Seattle which acted as a bank for the miners off-loading their gold from ships coming back from the Yukon Gold Rush in 1903 sits directly above the seedy Seattle Underground of criminals who robbed the hotel's rich clientele.
4	"Munchkin Mayhem; Undercover President; The Real Gatsby"	April 20, 2014
The Culver Hotel in Culver City, California is where showman Leo Singer rented out all 100 rooms to fit 125 Munchkins (3 to a bed) while filming The Wizard of Oz in 1938, giving birth to the "Hanging Munckin" Scandal. When former president Theodore Roosevelt runs for a third term under his "Bull Moose Party" on October 14, 1912, Gilpatrick Hotel (now the Hyatt Regency) in Milwaukee, Wisconsin becomes the scene of an assassination attempt by New York bartender John Schrank. The Little Bohemia Lodge in Manitowish Waters, Wisconsin becomes a place of interest when the newly formed FBI and Melvin Purvis battles the legendary bank robber, John Dillinger and his gang via shootout on April 20, 1934. In 1861, newly elected President Abraham Lincoln escapes an attempt on his life with the help of Pinkerton agent Kate Warne by desguising himself as a woman while using the Willard Hotel in Washington D.C. as a safehouse until his inauguration. During Prohibition, a basement speakeasy called "Rathskeller" at the Seelbach Hotel in Louisville, Kentucky was the hangout of aspiring writer F. Scott Fitzgerald who spied on famous gangsters like Al Capone and local bootlegger George Remus to get inspiration for The Great Gatsby.
5	"Sports Scandal; Explorer Murder Mystery; Slave Escape"	April 27, 2014
The Biltmore Hotel in Coral Gables, Florida was the crime scene of mobster Fatty Walsh who along with his boss Arnold Rothstein helped fixed the 1919 World Series in the Black Sox Scandal. On September 22, 1897, a group of outlaws, the "Wild Bunch" (The Sundance Kid, Kid Curry, Walter Putney) rob the bank of The Pollard Hotel in Red Lodge, Montana and get double-crossed by the town sheriff. In 1846, the Dock Street Theatre (originally The Planters Hotel) in Charleston, South Carolina was witness to the greatest performance when a runaway slave, William Craft disguised his fair-skinned wife Ellen as his white male master to escape a life of servitude. When world-famous explorer Meriwether Lewis checks-in at Grinder's Stand Inn, a rest stop on Tennessee's Natchez Trace Trail (now located in Natchez Trace State Park), he meets a mysterious end in his cabin in what appears to be two self-inflicted gunshot wounds. Jekyll Island Club Hotel on Jekyll Island, Georgia becomes the secret meeting place of six bankers, Nelson Aldrich, Paul Warburg, Frank Vanderlip, Benjamin Strong, Abram Andrew, and Henry P. Davison, who want to save their country from the Panic of 1907, and create a Central bank and Federal Reserve System.
6	"Space Race; Ghosts of Silver City; Surviving the Everglades"	April 27, 2014
International Palms Resort (originally Holiday Inn) in Cocoa Beach, Florida is where astronaut John Glenn waited anxiously for NASA to tell him his mission is a go, leading him to be the first American to orbit around the Earth on February 20, 1962. The Idaho Hotel in the ghost town of Silver City, Idaho was the beginning of the end of this former gold mining metropolis when two wealthy mine owners who started a mining war, have a showdown out front, resulting in one man's death in 1863. The origins of the Everglades Historical Bed & Breakfast (originally Bank of the Everglades) in Everglades City, Florida is linked to advertising mogul Barron Collier, who leads an expedition into the Everglades to plan the Tamiami Trail (U.S. Route 41). The General Warren Inne in Malvern, Pennsylvania plays a major role in the Paoli Massacre during the Revolutionary War when a rebel sympathizer gives up General Anthony Wayne's camp to the British while being interrogated at the inn. Abraham Lincoln recalls what happened near the Franklin House Hotel (now an apartments called "Lincoln Lofts") in Alton, Illinois in 1842; a duel with himself, then a young lawyer and James Shields, then a state auditor over the way Shields mis-handled Illinois' financial crisis.
7	"Imperfect Crime; Stagecoach Shocker; People's President"	May 4, 2014
In 1924, The Drake Hotel in Chicago, Illinois becomes the headquarters of authorities as they investigate the murder of Bobby Franks who was last seen with wealthy socialite teenagers Nathan Leopold and Richard Loeb. After a union labor dispute erupts in 1916, America's first celebrity chef, Victor Hirtzler continues cooking a banquet for Republican presidential candidate Charles Evans Hughes at the St. Francis Hotel in San Francisco, California, not knowing this meal will determine the election. Charley Parkhurst, the best stagecoach driver and "whip" on the West Coast shares a shocking secret at Wolf Creek Tavern (now called Wolf Creek Inn State Heritage Site) in Wolf Creek, Oregon. Right after the Attack on Pearl Harbor, the U.S. military flies Japanese-Americans from the Japanese Consulate in Honolulu to the remote Triangle T Ranch in Dragoon, Arizona, their makeshift headquarters, and interrogates Takeo Yoshikawa, who appears to a lowly clerk. After insulting his wife about being a bigamist, presidential-elect Andrew Jackson challenges attorney Charles Dickinson to a duel, which results in a scandalous campaign during a stop at Century Inn (formerly Hill's Tavern) in Scenery Hill, Pennsylvania.
8	"Dangerous Lottery; Yosemite's Hero; Shady Sheriff"	May 4, 2014
In 1923, after the Ohio Gang scandal, Warren G. Harding’s presidency ends suddenly when he dies in what is now Room 888 at the Palace Hotel in San Francisco, California. The lottery's history is born at El Bien Publico medical clinic (now the Don Vicente Inn) in Ybor City, Florida when it becomes the first place the Cuban game of "bolita" is played, which started a war between crime boss Charlie Wall and the Italian mob in late 1920s. Yosemite National Park is created after Theodore Roosevelt skips a lobbyist meeting at Wawona Hotel in Wawona, California and trailblazes with author John Muir who pitches to the president about conserving the valley. After he shoots town nuisance Jack Cleveland inside the Fairweather Inn in Bannack, Montana, former criminal Henry Plummer is made sheriff by the town's leaders, but his secret is revealed when the newly formed Montana Vigilantes find out he's the leader of a gang who's been robbing stagecoaches. After holding a secret meeting at the Old Talbott Tavern in Bardstown, Kentucky, the efforts by former vice president Aaron Burr to split America in two goes awry when his general, James Wilkinson tells President Thomas Jefferson of his plan for treason.
9	"Scandalous Televangelist; Dream Speech; British Invasion"	May 11, 2014
On December 6, 1980, Room 538 at the Sheraton Sand Key Resort in Clearwater Beach, Florida tells the story of the Jessica Hahn sex scandal that brought down the televangelism empire of Jim and Tammy Faye Bakker's "Praise the Lord Network". Before being burned down in a fire, The World's Fair Hotel in Chicago, Illinois, owned by H.H. Holmes, the world’s first known serial killer is known as the "Murder Castle" after the police find bones buried in the basement. The Willard Hotel in Washington D.C. becomes the place where civil rights leader, Martin Luther King Jr. writes his famous "I Have a Dream" speech for the Civil Rights Movement the night before he delivers it to a massive crowd on the National Mall. During the third stop on their American tour to Seattle, Washington of their British Invasion, British rock band, The Beatles saves The Edgewater Hotel's failing business when they spend the night in Room 272 in 1964, causing much publicity. The Hotel Hershey in Hershey, Pennsylvania sets the scene of female spy, Amy Elizabeth Pack and her love affair with Vichy, France attaché Charles Brousse influences the outcome of World War II after they steal naval cipher codes that aids the Allied invasion of North Africa.
10	"Vampire Outbreak; American Traitor; Corporate Retreat"	May 18, 2014
In 1934, three ladies' night of drunken rowdiness at the Renaissance Hotel in Cleveland, Ohio intersects with one of the biggest man-hunts in American history, when one woman arrested is the girlfriend of gangster Fred Barker of the Barker-Karpis gang. Future tech giant, Apple hosts a wild party at La Playa Carmel Hotel in Carmel-by-the-Sea, California in 1983 after developing the "Lisa computing system", much to the dislike of co-founder Steve Jobs who was forced off the project. The Meeker Hotel in Meeker, Colorado is put on the map when a bank robbery is foiled by townsfolk, leading to a shootout between them and three former members of the Wild Bunch, Jim Shirley, George Law and "The Kid". When British spy, Major John André plots with American traitor General Benedict Arnold to capture the fort at West Point, Old '76 House Tavern in Tappan, New York serves as his jail in 1780. Kedron Valley Inn (then the Ransom family farm) in Woodstock, Vermont was linked to a deadly outbreak believed to be vampirism during the New England vampire panic.
11	"Confederate Conspiracy; Psycho Surgeon; Jersey Man-Eater"	May 25, 2014
A conspiracy to eliminate President Abraham Lincoln and his executive administration is planned at the Surratt Inn in Washington D.C. In 1963 during the Cuban Missile Crisis, a meeting between ABC news reporter John Scali and Soviet spy Alexander Feklisov at the Occidental Grill in the Willard Hotel in Washington D.C. halted World War III between the U.S. and Soviet Union. Legendary lawman Eliot Ness uses The Renaissance Hotel in Cleveland, Ohio as headquarters to interrogate a surgeon-turned-serial killer who was known as the "Cleveland Torso Murderer", butchering 12 people in Kingsbury Run. The Engleside Inn in Beach Haven, New Jersey becomes famous for great white shark attacks on the Jersey Shore in the summer of 1916, known as the "Jersey Man-Eater". In 1921, The Drake Hotel in Chicago, Illinois is the scene of one of the most underhanded deals in American history masterminded by a corrupt Veterans' Bureau Director Charles Forbes who took a $5,000 bride at the hotel and embezzled $200 million during Warren G. Harding's presidency.
12	"LSD Lab Rats; Portrait of a Con Man; Presidential Ransom"	June 1, 2014
On December 20, 1957, a U.S. Marshal becomes a part of a CIA mind-control experiment code named "Project MKUltra" when he was drugged with LSD in Room 49 of what is now the Hotel del Sol in San Francisco, California. A legendary old mountain man named John "Liver-Eating" Johnson breaks up a brawl at the tavern inside The Pollard Hotel in Red Lodge, Montana in 1893. The Congress Plaza Hotel in Chicago, Illinois sets the scene for the rescue of the "Duchess of Devonshire", a prized painting that's been missing for 25 years from the owner who stole it, master criminal Adam Worth who made the exchange with Detective William Pinkerton. The Bellevue-Stratford Hotel in Philadelphia becomes the unlikely origin of a lethal flu strain called Legionnaires' disease when the hotel hosted an American Legion convention where 221 people became ill when it became airborne in the air conditioning vents. Irish mob boss, "Big Jim" Kennally plans to grave rob the tomb of Abraham Lincoln while at the St. Nicholas Hotel in Springfield, Illinois in 1876.
13	"Deadwood Duel; Subterranean Suite; Billionaire Bucket List"	June 8, 2014
Mineral Palace Hotel (then The Gem Theater, a brothel) in Deadwood, South Dakota starts the story of a showdown between businessman George Hearst and the town's de facto mayor Al Swearengen when Hearst builds the Homestake Mine, legalizing the lawless town. The Golden Lamb Inn in Lebanon, Ohio is the scene of former U.S. congressman-turned lawyer Clement Vallandigham who accidentally shot himself trying to prove his client's innocence by performing a demonstration with a loaded gun in his guest room. The Grand Canyon Caverns Inn in Arizona is home of the world's deepest hotel room that was discovered by a cowboy named Walter Peck who tripped and fell into a huge hole-turned massive cave during the monsoon season of 1927 and turned it into a tourist attraction. When the newly formed American government places a federal tax on small distillers, an uprising by whiskey farmers is born at the Jean Bonnet Tavern in Bedford, Pennsylvania causing the Whiskey Rebellion in 1791. During a torrential storm in 1921, the childish antics of three drunk old men, calling themselves "The Vagabonds" (Thomas Edison, Henry Ford and Harvey Firestone) seek shelter at the Summit Inn Resort in Farmington, Pennsylvania.
