= Church Secrets & Legends =

- Genre: Documentary; Reality
- Narrated by: Dave B. Mitchell
- Composers: 5 Alarm Music & PRS Music
- Country of origin: United States
- Original language: English
- No. of seasons: 1
- No. of episodes: 3

Production
- Executive producers: Gary Tarpinian; Paninee Theeranuntawat
- Producer: Gary Benthin
- Cinematography: Michael Ojeda; Jared Cowan; Bernard Blaise
- Editors: Duncan Sinclair, Greg Clausen, Rich Mason; Joe Sperandeo
- Running time: 60 minutes
- Production company: Morningstar Entertainment

Original release
- Network: Travel Channel
- Release: March 16 – March 30, 2014

Related
- Mysteries at the Castle; Mysteries at the Hotel

Church Secrets & Legends is an American documentary television series that premiered on Sunday, March 16, 2014, on the Travel Channel. The series features the secrets and legends hidden in the many churches, cathedrals and chapels, as well as other houses of worship all over the world. The first season episodes air every Sunday at 10:00 pm EST.

== Plot ==
Each episode includes dramatic recreations featuring actors re-telling the most mysterious, secret and strange stories and legends from a church's holy and not-so-holy history that the pastors or priests do not want their parishioners to find out. These stories have either have occurred inside the church or near the world's most famous and even not-so-famous churches.

Opening Introduction: (narrated by Dave B. Mitchell):

From soaring cathedrals to intimate chapels, sanctuaries of all faiths provide a beacon for seekers and a stage for astonishing mysteries, from divine intervention to unholy terror. Discover the mysteries of the world’s greatest houses of worship on Church Secrets & Legends.

== Episodes ==
No.	Title	Original release date
1	"Salem Witch Trials; World's Largest Cathedral; Grand Mosque of Paris"	March 16, 2014
Envisioned by St. John, prophetic sculptures predating the events of 9/11 surround the exterior of the Cathedral of St. John the Divine, an unfinished Episcopal church in New York City, New York. The origin story of the Salem Witch Trials is connected with the First Church in Salem in Salem, Massachusetts when Reverend Samuel Parris's slave is accused of witchcraft after putting a spell on his daughter who suffered from fits, making church minister Nicholas Noyes to start executing accused witches. In 1940, the Grand Mosque of Paris in Paris, France served as a secret refuge for Jews during the Holocaust led by Muslim elder of the mosque Kaddour Benghabrit who also helped hide famous Jewish singer Salim Halali when he was wanted by the Nazis. One of the world's most unusual churches, with over 10,000 panes of glass, the Crystal Cathedral in Orange County, California, founded by televangelist Robert H. Schuller of the Hour of Power TV program goes into a decline after he retires, leaving his family in a crisis as to who is going to take over. In 1775, Old North Church in Boston, Massachusetts becomes the spectacular stunt of English daredevil John Childs when he flies off the church's 200 foot steeple to a crowd of spectators.
2	"Underground Railroad; Killer Priest; Notre Dame Cathedral Mystery"	March 23, 2014
Emmanuel Episcopal Church in Cumberland, Maryland becomes a stop on the Underground Railroad when the church's minister recruits a young slave boy to help hide runaways through the basement tunnels. While preaching about resisting temptations of the flesh at St. Joseph of the Holy Family in New York City, New York, Father Hans Schmidt goes against his vow of celibacy and starts a sexual relationship with his chambermaid, leading to one of the bloodiest crimes in a house of God. The Angelus Temple in Los Angeles, California, a mega church with a 5,300 seat auditorium founded by Sister Aimee Semple McPherson who became a celebrity preaching Pentecostalism with the Church of the Foursquare Gospel created a scandal claiming she was kidnapped. When the Master of Macabre, Edgar Allan Poe mysteriously collapses on the street, he is buried without a headstone in Westminster Hall’s burying ground in Baltimore, Maryland and dark forces over his death ensue. The sin of cannibalism near the Notre Dame Cathedral in Paris, France is linked to the parish of Saint-Medard when a murderous butcher served human meat pies to two clerics, unbeknownst to what they were eating, they were excommunicated.
3	"Scientology; Dagger John; Napolean Murder Mystery"	March 30, 2014
An FBI investigation code named Operation Snow White involving the Celebrity Centre International, part of the Church of Scientology in Hollywood, California has science fiction writer and founder L. Ron Hubbard under suspicion of his new religion. Central Congregational Church in Fall River, Massachusetts becomes intertwined with member Lizzie Borden when she is accused of murdering her parents in 1892. When the St. Patrick's Old Cathedral in New York City, New York is attacked by Nativists, anti-Catholic rioters, Bishop "Dagger John" Hughes earns his nickname by rounding up an army of Irish immigrants to defend the church. Built by movie moguls in 1928, the once crumbling Wilshire Boulevard Temple was the center of controversy when Warner Bros. artist Hugo Ballin painted memorial murals on the walls, causing an uproar by Jews who said the "graven images" violated the Second Commandment, however, it was reversed when Dura-Europos in Syria was discovered with ancient art in its synagogue. The mystery surrounding Napoleon Bonaparte's tomb at the Eglise du Dome (today called Les Invalides) in Paris, France brought on a conspiracy that his body was switched when brought back from St. Helena during his exile.
