= Mysteries at the Castle =

American television series

- Also known as: Castle Secrets & Legends
- Genre: Documentary reality
- Narrated by: Ted Stewart
- Country of origin: United States
- Original language: English
- No. of seasons: 3
- No. of episodes: 31

Production
- Executive producers: David E. Gerber; Nicola Moody; Domininc Stobart
- Producer: Amanda Abel Desai
- Editors: Ed Kaz, Marc Senter, Jacob Serlen, Sak Costanzo, Nigel Filson, Fred Heismeyer, Michael Lioce, Leigh Anne Sides, Gerard Sztabnik
- Running time: 60 minutes
- Production company: Optomen Productions

Original release
- Network: Travel Channel
- Release: January 19, 2014 – March 31, 2016

Related
- Mysteries at the Museum; Mysteries at the Monument; Church Secrets & Legends; Mysteries at the Hotel; Mysteries at the National Parks

Mysteries at the Castle (formerly Castle Secrets & Legends) is an American reality television series that premiered on January 19, 2014, on the Travel Channel. The series features the secrets and legends "behind the gates and walls" of castles, mansions and manor houses around the world. The first-season episodes aired on Sundays at 10:00pm, while the second and third-season episodes were moved to Fridays at 9:00pm EST. It was then moved to Thursdays at 9:00pm EST in the middle of the third season.

Note: In season 2, which premiered on January 2, 2015, the series name was changed to Mysteries at the Castle.

== Premise ==
Each episode includes dramatic recreations featuring actors re-telling the most mysterious, secret and strange stories and legends from a castle's history. These stories have occurred either inside the fortifications or near the many famous and even infamous castles in Europe and America.

== Series overview ==
Season	Episodes	Originally released	
Season	Episodes	First released	Last released
1	5	January 19, 2014	February 23, 2014
2	13	January 2, 2015	March 27, 2015
3	13	January 8, 2016	March 31, 2016

== Episodes ==
=== Season 1 (2014) ===
No. overall	No. in season	Title	Original release date
1	1	"Real Frankenstein; Mummy Curse; Man in the Iron Mask"	January 19, 2014
In the series premiere, a scandalous affair between a British government minister, a showgirl, and a Soviet spy begins at Cliveden House in Taplow, England. Frankenstein Castle, now in ruins on a rocky hilltop in Darmstadt, Germany is the home of scientist, Johann Konrad Dippel who conducted experiments to bring the dead back to life and was the inspiration behind Mary Shelley's Frankenstein. Highclere Castle in Hampshire, one of the most famous country manor houses in England holds Egyptian treasure when after the home's owner, the fifth Earl of Caranrvon is cursed when he unearths the long-buried tomb of Tutankhamun. The legend of the Man in the Iron Mask's place of imprisonment is revealed at the foreboding Fort Royal on the island of Île Sainte-Marguerite a part of the Lérins Islands, a half a mile from France's coast off Cannes. A visit to Hammond Castle in Gloucester, Massachusetts, where inventor John Hays Hammond Jr. and psychic medium Eileen Garrett experimented with a Faraday Cage proving if ESP exists.
1	2	"Crown Jewels Heist; Marquis de Sade; Enigma of Kaspar Hauser"	January 26, 2014
The Tower of London in London, England, built in 1066 as a royal residence is where the crown jewels are securely kept until an attempt by Irish rebel Thomas Blood who tried to steal the regalia in 1671. The Morris-Jumel Mansion in New York City is still home of the ghost of Eliza Jumel who is believed to have let her wine merchant husband die by bleeding to death in their home in 1832. The Château de Miolans, an impenetrable bastion in St. Pierre d’Albigny in the South of France is where the French aristocrat-turned writer Marquis de Sade was imprisoned after an out of control party in 1772 landed him an attempted murder charge. The Karlsruhe Palace in Karlsruhe, Germany, erected in 1706 kept a centuries-old secret about a mysterious teenage boy, Kaspar Hauser who was found claiming to have spent his life locked in a windowless room there. With his passion for fast cars, William Vanderbilt's idea to build a raceway while at his Spanish-style mansion, Eagle’s Nest in Centerport, New York, paves the way for America’s modern age. A plot to kill the protestant Queen Elizabeth I is hatched by Catholic conspirators in the secret passageways of Thrumpton Hall, a 16th-century country manor in Nottinghamshire, England.
1	3	"Hound of the Baskervilles; Lord Gordon-Gordon; Escape from Colditz"	February 9, 2014
Cromer Hall, a British manor house on a moor inspired Sir Arthur Conan Doyle to write his classic novel, The Hound of the Baskervilles of his Sherlock Holmes stories. When Scottish aristocrat Lord Gordon-Gordon gets a share in the Erie Railroad, it results in a scandal from a scheme by Wall Street robber baron Jay Gould, and owner of a castle known as Lyndhurst in Tarrytown, New York. An escape attempt by British captain Pat Reid unfolds inside the stone walls of Colditz Castle in Colditz, Germany that served as a Nazi-run POW camp during World War II. Berkeley Castle in Berkeley Springs, West Virginia, was built by Colonel Samuel Taylor Suit for his young bride, who after his death, was believed to be involved in her lovers' deaths. In 1885, the history of Tour Magdala, a remote citadel in the medieval village of Rennes-le-Château becomes a treasure hunter's dream when a priest, Bérenger Saunière finds parchments from Blanche of Castile's hidden 8th century gold. Marble House, a neoclassical mansion in Newport, Rhode Island, set the stage of a famous mother-daughter conflict of the Gilded Age when social-climber, Alva Erskine Smith locks her daughter in her room when she refuses an arranged marriage.
1	4	"The Tichborne Claimant; Washington Resurrection; Loch Ness Hoax"	February 16, 2014
Castello di Malaspina in Fosdinovo, Italy becomes a tomb for Bianca Malaspina, an albino girl who defied her noble parents when she fell in love with a stable boy, causing them to brick her up alive in the dungeon. Upton House in Poole, England was a part of an inheritance dispute when a man from Wagga Wagga, Australia, claimed to be English aristocrat Roger Tichborne, the family's sole heir who drowned in a shipwreck 10 years prior. On Friday the 13th, December 1799, George Washington falls ill, and after doctors try to treat him with bloodletting, he passes away the next day in his home, Mount Vernon in Mount Vernon, Virginia, however, Dr. William Thornton proposes a radical procedure to reanimate him. When French emperor Napoleon is exiled on the small island of Elba, 7 miles off Italy's coast, his plans to escape are born in his 17th century manor, Villa dei Mulini. Sightings of the Loch Ness Monster date back to the 6th century when Irish missionary Saint Columba spotted the creature on Loch Ness near Urquhart Castle in Inverness, Scotland. Washington Times-Herald owner, Eleanor "Cissy" Patterson makes Mount Airy Mansion in Upper Marlboro, Maryland, her home after fleeing her womanizing husband.
1	5	"The Black Dinner; Voynich Manuscript; Seward Attack"	February 23, 2014
In 1440, the boy king, James II takes revenge on the rebellious Earl of Douglas for wanting his throne by inviting him to a banquet at Edinburgh Castle in Edinburgh, Scotland, later known as the "Black Dinner", inspiring one of the most brutal scenes in the Game of Thrones. When a wealthy widow of railroad millionaire Mark Hopkins falls ill and dies after marrying Edward Searles, the designer of Searles Castle in Great Barrington, Massachusetts, the community believes he poisoned her for money. Gradara Castle in Gradara, Italy was at the center of two warring families—the Malatestas and the Polentas—who married off their beautiful daughter Francesca to the ugly Giovanni Malatesta, starting a tragic tale of love between her and his brother, Paolo. Danesfield House in Marlow, England was the headquarters of the British CIU where RAF officer Constance Babington Smith discovered an aerial recon photo of Nazi V-1's, causing Operation Crossbow during[World War II. After an attempt on his life by conspirator Lewis Powell in the Lincoln assassination conspiracy, Secretary of State William Seward retires at his beloved home, today called the Seward House Museum in Auburn, New York. Villa Mondragone in Rome, Italy is the site where the mystery of the Voynich Manuscript began when antique book dealer Wilfrid Voynich discovered an ancient book written in a cryptic cipher in 1912.

=== Season 2 (2015) ===
Note: Episodes in this season aired under the changed title name Mysteries at the Castle.

No. overall	No. in season	Title	Original release date	U.S. viewers
2	1	"Dracula; Queen and the Mistress; King Arthur"	January 2, 2015	680,000
After impaling his Turkish enemies at Bran Castle in Bran, Romania, the bloodthirsty prince, Vlad III (aka Vlad the Impaler) inspires Bram Stoker's Dracula, one of the most notorious characters in modern literature. Glastonbury Abbey in Glastonbury, England was once the setting of the mythical tale of King Arthur and the legendary love triangle of Sir Lancelot and Queen Guinevere. When an ailing U.S. Army medic is pronounced dead from meningitis, he makes a miraculous recovery, and doctors use his blood for a cure, inspiring him to live a long life building his dream home, Loveland Castle in Loveland, Ohio. Castle Predjama in Predjama, Slovenia was once the center of an epic siege between Erasmus Luegar, a murderous knight and Emperor Fredrick III's army who are sworn to bring him to justice. Château de Chenonceau in Loire Valley, France, plays an important role in a three-way war raged between King Henry II, his vengeful queen Catherine de' Medici, and his materialistic mistress Diane de Poitiers that made for an explosive marriage. Wealthy businessman Henry Flagler and his idea of creating an overseas railroad to Key West are engineered at his tropical palace, Whitehall in Palm Beach, Florida.
2	2	"Henry 8th; Bannerman's Castle Curse; Mechanical Turk Hoax"	January 9, 2015	N/A
King Henry VIII's uncontrollable obsession to retain his reign by producing a male heir with his three wives paves the way for a tale of tragedy taking place at Hampton Court Palace near Surrey, England. Carlisle Castle in Carlisle, England was home to King William II, whose suspicious death led many to believe he was murdered by Walter Tirel, a possible assassin hired by his younger brother Henry I to ascend the throne. Schönbrunn Palace in Vienna, Austria becomes the showplace of inventor Wolfgang von Kempelen's creation "The Turk", a chess-playing automaton made for Empress Maria Theresa. When wealthy heiress Lucy Aldrich travels to China, it turns into a harrowing journey when she gets kidnapped by bandits, and it all started at the Aldrich House in Providence, Rhode Island. Ammunitions dealer Francis Bannerman's beloved bastion, Bannerman Castle on Pollepel Island in New York was reduced to ruins after his global empire came crashing down in an explosion of greed, betrayal and the sinister curse of a tugboat captain. Knole Park Estate in Almondsbury, England once became a safe haven for exotic foreign Princess Caraboo after her daring escape from pirates, but her story quickly turns into a tall tale.
2	3	"Faust; Pirate Queen; First Versailles"	January 16, 2015	N/A
Alchemist-astrologer Johannes Faust's desire for knowledge leads him into a pact with the devil with his demon Mephistopheles at Waardenburg Castle in Waardenburg, Netherlands. Rockfleet Castle, a strategic stronghold in Newport, County Mayo, Ireland becomes the center of Pirate queen Grace O'Malley and powerful chieftain Richard Burke who clash in a tale of passion, betrayal, and later, love. During the English Civil War, captured King Charles I plans an escape from at Carisbrooke Castle in Carisbrooke on the Isle of Wight, England. W.K. Kellogg Manor House in Hickory Corners, Michigan, hides a bitter family feud that paved the way for a culinary revolution when an accidental discovery was cooked up by the mansion’s owner. Jean-Baptiste Colbert's plan to backstab his rival, the Minister of Finance Nicolas Fouquet by telling King Louis XIV that the treasurer used state funds to build Vaux-le-Vicomte in Maincy, France. On the brink of defeat, a young patriot comes up with a perilous plan and it all centers on New York's Fort Ticonderoga in the Adirondacks.
2	4	"Green Lady; Count of Monte Cristo; Robin Hood"	January 23, 2015	N/A
Trapped in a loveless marriage, Charlotte de Breze seeks affection by having a secret affair, but when her brutal husband Jacques de Breze finds out, it results her vengeful ghost at the Château de Brissac in Loire Valley, France. After toy production is banned for the holidays during World War I, A. C. Gilbert becomes "the man who saved Christmas" with his invention of the Erector Set, inspiring the design of his home, Maraldene Mansion in New Haven, Connecticut. The tragic tale of Pierre Picaud becomes the inspiration of Alexandre Dumas's novel The Count of Monte Cristo when he plotted revenge while a prisoner inside the foreboding prison at Fenestrelle Fort in Fenestrelle, Italy. Brewer Henry Meux digs himself out of bankruptcy after a large vat at the Horse Shoe Brewery caused a tidal wave of beer that flooded the streets of London, leaving a lasting legacy at the Theobalds House in Hertfordshire, England. Nottingham Castle in Nottingham, England will forever be linked to the legendary outlaw Robin Hood's epic escape from the dungeons of the Sheriff of Nottingham. After the sudden death of his wife inspires Samuel Morse to invent the telegraph, he reaps the rewards in building Locust Grove in Poughkeepsie, New York.
2	5	"House That Saved a King; Joan of Arc; Hamilton Sex Scandal"	January 30, 2015	N/A
In 1651, Moseley Old Hall near Staffordshire, England, becomes the hiding place of the future King Charles II who escaped Parliamentary forces during the English Civil War. The heroic story of German officer Claus von Stauffenberg, who came up with a plot to assassinate Adolf Hitler during World War II started at his birthplace inside Jettingen Castle in Jettingen-Scheppach, Germany. Hamilton Grange in New York City is the setting for a sordid scandal involving one of America's founding fathers, Alexander Hamilton and his mistress Maria Reynolds. The unsolved mystery of the Green Children all took place on the grounds of Wyken Hall in Suffolk, England. The Royal Fortress of Chinon in Loire Valley, France was where peasant girl, Joan of Arc met with King Charles VII and left a warrior who drove back the English army during the Siege of Orléans, forever changing the course of French history. Inventor Thomas Edison's experiment with concrete housing was first developed at his home, Glenmont Estate in West Orange, New Jersey.
2	6	"Royal Baccarat Scandal; Soleste and Moroello; Franz Ferdinand"	February 6, 2015	N/A
Playboy prince, Edward VII was embroiled in a scandal while playing an illegal game of baccarat at Tranby Croft near Hull, England, that almost cost him the throne. The legend of Moroello and Soleste, a heartbreaking tale of ill-fated love and its haunting aftermath plays out behind the walls of Bardi Castle in Bardi, Italy. Artstetten Castle's crypt in Artstetten, Austria becomes the final resting place of Austria-Hungary's, Archduke Franz Ferdinand when his motorcade takes a fateful wrong turn into global disaster, and he and his wife, Sophie are assassinated by Black Hand member, Gavrilo Princip. When longshoreman union leader Harry Bridges starts a city-wide strike in 1934, it makes California Governor's Mansion in Sacramento a reminder of the labor movement. Astronomer William Parsons builds a great telescope at his home, Birr Castle in Birr, Ireland and with it, discovers the Whirlpool Galaxy. During the Civil War, a Confederate spy longs to visit his beloved at Carlyle House in Alexandria, Virginia, however, the mansion is in Union territory.
2	7	"Book Chest; Miracle of Anne Greene; Hemingway's Last Cent"	February 13, 2015	678,000
The prison at Oxford Castle in Oxford, England, was where lowly servant, Anne Greene overcame a shocking injustice by her employer and returned from the dead after being hanged in 1650. When his young son was diagnosed with rheumatoid arthritis, Italian immigrant Candido Jacuzzi's innovation of the Jacuzzi tub help eased his pain and funded the Jacuzzi Family Home in Sonoma, California. When philosopher Hugo Grotius is imprisoned for life after writing controversial papers on Arminianism, he stages an escape from the Netherlands' Loevestein Castle near Poederoijen. After journalist Charles Fletcher Lummis gets his dream job at the Los Angeles Times, he decides to take death-defying journey through America in order to get there, inspiring his L.A. home, the Lummis House. When struggling painter, Geert Jan Jansen turns to art forgery, he dups the art world and reaps the rewards, but his outlandish operation comes to a head at Zeist Castle in Utrecht, Netherlands. The Hemingway House in Key West, Florida, was the setting for Ernest Hemingway's second martial meltdown, when his soon to be ex-wife Pauline Pfeiffer literally takes him for his last cent, encasing the penny at the foot of the pool she built for him.
2	8	"Book Thief; Bigamist Dutchess; Patent-ly Absurd"	February 20, 2015	699,000
A book thief pulls off an incredible heist that unfolds at the mountaintop retreat of Mont Sainte-Odile Abbey in the Vosges Mountains of France. York Castle in York, England was where infamous highwayman Dick Turpin was incarnated after being caught in a manhunt that ended his long crime spree. After Elizabeth Chudleigh, Duchess of Kingston is charged with bigamy by marrying in her youth Augustus Hervey, 3rd Earl of Bristol and then Evelyn Pierrepont, 2nd Duke of Kingston-upon-Hull, her rags to riches story ends in scandal, exiling her from Thoresby Hall in Nottinghamshire, England. When an art conservator discovers a portrait of former First Lady Mary Lincoln is a fake in 2010, he pinpoints its origins to vaudeville actor Lew Bloom who created the hoax, which hung in the Illinois Executive Mansion in Springfield, Illinois. Trifels Castle in Annweiler, Germany becomes the place of King Richard the Lionheart's imprisonment, and if it wasn't for his mother's ransom payment, he would have been kept there by his usurper brother's bribes. A chemist creates a cure-all tonic that enthralls the ailing public, making him believe his medicine is truly a miracle, when the funds construct the Seelye Mansion in Abilene, Kansas.
2	9	"Martin Luther Kidnapping; Witches of Belvoir; Secret Queen"	February 27, 2015	N/A
After the Earl of Rutland's two sons die at their family estate, Belvoir Castle near Grantham, England, he believes they were cursed by the Witches of Belvoir. When the Catholic Church arrests revolutionary monk Martin Luther, his protestant supporters rescue him and escape to Wartburg Castle in Eisenach, Germany. The Highlands Ranch Mansion in Highlands Ranch, Colorado, was once the home of socialite Isabel Springer, whose affair with two men at the same time led to the 1911 shooting. Château de Maintenon in Maintenon, France becomes the secret setting of the scandalous royal romance between King Louis XIV and his mistress, Françoise d'Aubigné. When German officer, Gunther Plüschow is captured, he makes one of the most daring escapes in history from Donington Hall in Derby, England, once a POW camp during World War I. Railroad baron James J. Hill's plan to run a train line through some of America's toughest terrain all began at his home, the James J. Hill House in St. Paul, Minnesota.
2	10	"The Real Beauty and the Beast; Birdman of Scotland; Master of Disguise"	March 6, 2015	705,000
The Château de Blois in Blois, France was the boyhood home of a "monster", who with his wife, inspired one of the most famous fairy tales of all time, Beauty and the Beast. As the most wanted man, Confederate States Secretary of State Judah P. Benjamin sparks a chase across America, seeking refuge at the Gamble Mansion in Ellenton, Florida. Eccentric Italian alchemist John Damian de Falcucci launches an experiment of human-powered flight when he tries to fly off the battlements of Stirling Castle in Stirling, Scotland. La Fortaleza in San Juan, Puerto Rico was the scene of a life-or-death stand-off when a man armed with a knife enters, putting Governor Sila María Calderón's life on the line. When freedom fighter Robert Emmet plans to attack Dublin Castle in Dublin, Ireland, the English seat of government, it makes history as the site of the Irish rebellion of 1803. The once spirited young poet, Emily Dickinson mysteriously withdraws from society and only the walls of the Emily Dickinson Homestead in Amherst, Massachusetts, know the reason why.
2	11	"Irish Art Heist; Dickens Affair; Prince of Porcelain"	March 13, 2015	N/A
Russborough House in County Wicklow, Ireland becomes the scene for one of the biggest art heists in the world when members of the IRA, including English radical Rose Dugdale stole 19 paintings from owner Alfred Lane Beit in 1974. The story of sizzling stage star Josephine Baker's mission to free France from Nazi occupation during World War II all started at her home, Château des Milandes in Périgord, France. Literary titan Charles Dickens conceals an illicit affair with 18-year-old actress Ellen Ternan, giving in to temptation on the grounds of Château d'Hardelot in Condette, France. After a sword fight between French soldiers break out over a lady's honor, the disappearance of the slain leads to the haunting discovery of his headless body at Old Fort Niagara Castle in Youngstown, New York. When alchemist Johann Friedrich Böttger's quest to turn base metals into gold is a fraud, he is held captive by Augustus II the Strong at Albrechtsburg Castle in Meissen, Germany, where he discovers the formula of porcelain. Industrialist Henry Ford along with test pilot Harry J. Brooks set records in aviation with his small plane the "Ford Flivver", but fails to land at his winter retreat, The Mangoes in Fort Myers, Florida.
2	12	"Making of an Artist; Secret Sonar; Fairy Flag"	March 20, 2015	699,000
Wealthy widow Mary Eleanor Bowes falls prey to a scheme by fraudster Andrew Robinson Stoney who plotted marriage to steal her fortune at Glamis Castle in Glamis, Scotland. Lonely outcast-tuned-famous painter Henri de Toulouse-Lautrec changes the art world forever and it all began at his childhood home, Château du Bosc in Aveyron, France. Architectural genius, Frank Lloyd Wright designs Graycliff Estate in Derby, New York, drawing inspiration on his time in Tokyo when he developed an earthquake-proof building. When a chief of the Clan MacLeod weds a fairy princess, a legendary love story and a magical flag unfurls through the generations at Dunvegan Castle in Isle of Skye, Scotland. Casa Loma in Toronto, Canada, becomes a covert site of an ultra-top secret operation to develop sonar devices during the Second World War. After the new United States places a tax on whiskey, radical leader David Bradford forms a militia causing a conflict that comes to a head at his home, the Myrtles Plantation in St. Francisville, Louisiana.
2	13	"Battle to Cross the Channel; Royal Matchmaker; Boettcher Kidnapping"	March 27, 2015	644,000
Château de Maillebois in Maillebois, France, was the launch pad for a contest between French aviators, Louis Blériot and Hubert Latham to be the first pilot to cross the English Channel. When his beloved Elizabeth Bowes-Lyon refuses his marriage proposals, the lovelorn Prince Albert has a secret cupid in Margaret Greville inside her estate, Polesden Lacey in Great Bookham, England. A kidnapping of a millionaire carried out by Verne Sankey, America's first public enemy #1 is connected to Boettcher Mansion in Golden, Colorado. When mathematician Émilie du Châtelet loses her fortune playing a high-stakes card game at Château de Fontainebleau in Fontainebleau, France, she creates a contract to pay it back. After sailing to find the island of Bimini's Fountain of Youth, explorer Juan Ponce de León accidentally discovers the state of Florida, affording him to build La Casa Blanca in San Juan, Puerto Rico. The story of Mars Candies founder Frank Mars', success in creating the Milky Way bar results in Milky Way Farm in Pulaski, Tennessee.

=== Season 3 (2016) ===
No. overall	No. in season	Title	Original release date	U.S. viewers
3	1	"The Diamond Necklace Affair; Topless Duel; Abseiling Escape"	January 8, 2016	490,000
Don learns of the Affair of the Diamond Necklace started by an 18th-century con artist named Jeanne de Valois-Saint-Rémy that involved Marie Antoinette and the greedy Cardinal Rohan in France's Château de Versailles. Discovers Kynžvart Castle in Czech Republic was the setting of a bare-chested duel between two hot-headed socialites—Princess Pauline Metternich vs. Countess Anastasia Kielmannsegg. Visits Königstein Fortress, where imprisoned French general, Henri Giraud once made a daring escape to freedom during World War II. Explores the secrets behind Harry Houdini's estate hidden in Hollywood Hills, California. Goes inside Kew Palace, the childhood home of King George III where his illness almost drove him to madness. And examines the story of spiritualism at Seminole Lodge in Fort Myers, Florida, where Thomas Edison conducted his strangest experiment ever—proof of an afterlife with his device that could communicate with those who passed on at a séance.
3	2	"Fall of the Knights Templar; Resurrecting Sherlock; Weeping Stones Curse"	January 15, 2016	502,000
With evidence from the Chinon Parchment, Don examines the origins of Friday the 13th at Paris' La Conciergerie when King Philip IV of France falsely accused and arrested the Knights Templar, causing their downfall. Arthur Conan Doyle revives his iconic character Sherlock Holmes through actor William Gillette who resurrects the sleuth on the stage and dedicates his home Gillette Castle in East Haddam, Connecticut, to the detective. Learns the legend of the Weeping Stones Curse put on Fyvie Castle in Aberdeenshire, Scotland, by prophetic minstrel Thomas the Rhymer after a gust of wind shut the home's gates to him. Discovers that Château de Chambord was built on the ego of King Francis of France to make his archrival Emperor Charles V of the Habsburg Empire jealous of French culture. Explores Allerton Castle in Harrogate, England, the former home of Prince Frederick, Duke of York whose illicit affair with Mary Anne Clarke and public trial caused his resignation as commander-in-chief of the British army.
3	3	"Good King Wenceslas; Prison Painter; Butlers's Secret"	January 22, 2016	570,000
Prague Castle in Prague, Czech Republic, was the setting of a bitter rivalry that came to a head when the peaceful king Wenceslaus I was slayed by his brother Boleslav the Cruel to overtake the throne. A prison during the French Revolution, Palais du Luxembourg in Paris, France was where artist Jacques-Louis David was imprisoned for his involvement in the Reign of Terror, leading to his masterpiece The Intervention of the Sabine Women, earning his freedom. The story of a jealous butler learns of his master, William Keyt's affair with a young maid that sends him running for his life from Burnt Norton Estate in Chipping Campden, England, Berkeley Plantation in Charles City, Virginia, becomes the site of the first Thanksgiving in 1619 when ship captain John Woodleaf is thankful for surviving a storm on his voyage to the New World a year before the pilgrims made it to Plymouth. The Virgin Queen, Elizabeth I's romantic liaison with nobleman Robert Dudley who the public believed to have killed his wife Amy Robsart culminates at Kenilworth Castle in Kenilworth, England. After her husband dies, Eilley Bowers turns to a successful career in fortune-telling at her beloved home, the Bowers Mansion in Washoe County, Nevada.
3	4	"The Brothers Grimm; Savior of Fort Jefferson; Missing Head of State"	January 29, 2016	644,000
Philippsruhe Castle in Hanau, Germany, honors the work of Jacob and Wilhelm Grimm, who became the legendary storytellers, Brothers Grimm after revising crude folk tales into children-friendly fairy tales. When Fort Jefferson at Dry Tortugas National Park in Florida suffers a yellow fever epidemic, inmate Samuel Mudd, a doctor accused of playing a part in Abraham Lincoln’s assassination, redeems himself by saving 270 people from the disease. Château de Pau in Pau, France, the birthplace of King Henry IV, recalls the life of a benevolent monarch and the quest to find his missing mummified head. After shipping magnate G.W. Adams plans his dream home, Prospect Place Mansion in Trinway, Ohio, turns into a nightmare when a bricklayer he hired to build it burns it down. As a RAF Fighter Command during World War II, Bentley Priory in Stanmore, England becomes the setting where military commanders come up with a solution to stop the Nazis in The Blitz, using aircraft interception radar against them. Hardwick Hall in Derbyshire, England bears witness to the romantic relationship of Lady Arbella Stuart and William Seymour that was opposed by her cousin King James I.
3	5	"Betrayal of William Wallace; Casanova's Greatest Love; Astronomical Whodunnit"	February 5, 2016	661,000
The legend of Scottish rebel William Wallace comes to an end when he is captured by English King Edward I at Chillingham Castle in Northumberland, England. Duchcov Chateau in Duchcov, Czech Republic is where the great seducer Giacomo Casanova spent his last days after losing his love for a married Frenchwoman. Kronborg Castle in Helsingør, Denmark once served as an observatory to astronomer Tycho Brahe whose sudden illness leading to his death was solved over 400 years later. When a young Winston Churchill, who served as a reporter during the Second Boer War is imprisoned, he escapes and returns to his home at Blenheim Palace in Oxfordshire, England. Shakespeare's Birthplace in Stratford-upon-Avon, England tells the story of Shakespeare collector Samuel Ireland who fell victim of the famous playwright's forgeries created by his son, William Henry to get his father's attention. The estate Stonecliffe in Mackinac Island, Michigan, becomes a safe haven for the Cudahy family after the 1900 kidnapping of their teenage son Edward Jr.
3	6	"Queen Victoria Assassination Attempt; Lucky Lindy; Affair of the Poisons"	February 12, 2016	648,000
Kensington Palace in London, England, Queen Victoria's birthplace, is celebrated for the brave monarch's help in baiting her assailant to his arrest after an assassination attempt. The Knight family, who created their dream home Vikingsholm in Tahoma, California, sets a place in aviation history by funding Charles Lindbergh's 1927 non-stop solo flight across the Atlantic. Château de Vincennes in Vincennes, France, was once a prison that held offenders of the poison affair, including fortune teller Marie Bosse. Fortezza Vecchia in Livorno, Italy, exhibits the Amedeo Modigliani sculpture heads hoax that occurred in 1984 when students threw their amateur works into the Royal Canal so the public would believe it was the artist's masterpieces he threw away decades before. Indiana Territory Governor William Henry Harrison's mansion Grouseland in Vincennes, Indiana, starts a series of presidential deaths 20 years a part linked by a curse of "The Prophet", who wanted to avenge his brother Shawnee Chief Tecumseh's death during his war. Ardkinglas Estate in Cairndow, Scotland, is a reminder of feminist Caroline Sheridan who proposed the Infant Custody Bill after her abusive husband denied her divorce and custody over their children.
3	7	"Prince's Plight; Mad King Ludwig; Falling for Love"	February 19, 2016	635,000
After escaping from Dunstaffnage Castle in Oban, Scotland, Bonnie Prince Charles Edward Stuart flees the country with help from his supporter Flora MacDonald who disguised him as an Irish maid. After being in debt by building fairy tale castles, the eccentric King Ludwig II is forced out of his beloved Neuschwanstein Castle in Schwangau, Germany when he is deemed mad by psychiatrist Dr. Bernhard von Gudden. Dunrobin Castle in Golspie, Scotland becomes haunted by the ghost of Lady Margaret, the Earl of Sutherland's daughter after she fell to her death from a tower in order to be with her true love, a stable boy (presented by Dr Leo Ruickbie). Vice Admiral Bertram Ramsay makes the secret tunnels at Dover Castle in Dover, England his headquarters to plan the rescue of 300,000 Allied soldiers trapped on the beaches of Dunkirk, France, known as Operation Dynamo during the Second World War. The story of two ladies escape their pre-destined lives to make their dream of living an unconventional life together, finding their "new home" at Plas Newydd in Llangollen, Wales. Louisiana's Old State Capitol in Baton Rouge was once linked to the Louisiana Scandals of 1939 when Governor Richard Leche had the building restored using taxpayers' money.
3	8	"Pink Diamond Heist; Bloody Baron; Samlesbury Witches"	February 25, 2016	N/A
In 1926, Château de Chantilly in Chantilly, France becomes the scene of a heist where robbers made off with its pink diamond called Le Grand Condé, but was recovered by a hungry chambermaid as she bit into the burglars' apple. Castello di Roccascalegna in Roccascalegna, Italy, once the home of cruel baron, Corvo de Corvis, now haunts the castle after suffering a violent death when he renewed the medieval law jus primae noctis; virgin brides must submit to him on their first night. Samlesbury Hall in Samlesbury, England stands as a grim reminder of the Samlesbury witches trial when a Catholic priest who lived there had a girl accuse three women of witchcraft after they switched to Protestantism. After surviving an assault by a thug during a political debate in 1843, anti-slavery activist Cassius Clay flees to his home, White Hall in Richmond, Kentucky. In order to restore his family's honor, French knight Jean de Carrouges requests the last trial by combat after his rival Jacques Le Gris ravaged his wife at their home, Château de Carrouges in Carrouges, France. Stratford Hall in Stratford, Virginia, was the home of Major Henry Lee who tasked Sergeant Major John Champe in capturing the traitor Benedict Arnold.
3	9	"Deadliest Chess Game; Gustav III Assassination; Shot in the Heart"	March 3, 2016	484,000
After marrying the Countess of Ross to get lands and a title, Alexander Stewart, "The Wolf of Badenoch" pillages his way across the country, that even the Devil takes notice of his evil, and challenges him to play a deadly game of chess (presented by Dr Leo Ruickbie). Gustav III's Pavilion in Solna, Sweden becomes the final resting place of the beloved King Gustav III after nobleman Jacob Johan Anckarström is so angered by the monarch's progressive liberal reforms that he assassinates him at a masquerade ball. Mount Helena in Rolling Fork, Mississippi, was once home to a young woman named Helen who lost her fiancé Henry in a duel a week before their wedding and buried him on the same day. Bamburgh Castle in Bamburgh, England was once home to Jacobite Thomas Forster and her sister Dorothy, who risked her life to help break her brother out of prison during the 1715 uprising. After his divorce to a risqué dancer becomes too public, wealthy playboy George Whittell Jr. builds an escape known as Thunderbird Lodge in Incline Village, Nevada. Mugdock Castle in Mugdock, Scotland, is linked to the legend of Rob Roy MacGregor, "the Robin Hood of the Highlands" when the stronghold's overlord, the ruthless Duke of Montrose seized his lands.
3	10	"Savior of Flamenco; Murderous Mathelda; The Bickerstaff Hoax"	March 10, 2016	562,000
After a stabbing that destroyed his career as a young man, elderly flamenco vocalist Diego Bermúdez Cala gets a second chance to sing on stage during a contest inside the Alhambra in Granada, Spain. Castello di Poppi in Poppi, Italy, is haunted by the murderous Matilda, Count Guidi's gorgeous wife, who after luring men to her bed chamber, sent them on their way through a deadly trap door. Moor Park in Farnham, England was home to author Jonathan Swift whose satire in his almanac under pseudonym Isaac Bickerstaff, predicted John Partridge's death after the astrologer caused a mass panic by faking a fever epidemic. When power-hungry Johan Struensee is appointed the royal physician to mad King Christian VII, he neglects his duties and manipulates the monarch into becoming regent at Christiansborg Palace in Copenhagen, Denmark. Pittock Mansion in Portland, Oregon, is a reminder to outdoorsman Henry Pittock, who proved his boss Thomas Dryer at The Oregonian a fraud for claiming he was the first to climb Mount Hood, by scaling the mountain himself. Le Logis Royal in Loches, France, was the scene of a mysterious murder when King Charles VII’s mistress, Agnès Sorel was poisoned by an unknown enemy.
3	11	"Aussie Adam & Eve; Corpse Queen; Voyage of the Clermont"	March 17, 2016	588,000
After sentenced to death for thievery, doomed lovers, Henry Kable and Susannah Holmes are imprisoned at Norwich Castle in Norwich, England, but gets deported and transforms the penal colony of Australia. Quinta das Lágrimas in Coimbra, Portugal holds the legend of forbidden royal love between Prince Pedro and Inês de Castro, who after being slain on King Alonso IV's orders, her body was put on the throne by her beloved. Engineer Robert Fulton changed the way of long-distance travel when he built the first steamboat Clermont, named after his financier Robert Livingston's home Clermont Mansion in Germantown, New York. When the Parliamentarians laid siege to Dunnottar Castle in Stonehaven, Scotland, home to the Scottish Crown Jewels, a preacher's wife becomes a hero when she smuggles them out under her dress. Sagamore Hill in Oyster Bay, New York, once the summer retreat of Teddy Roosevelt, is a reminder of the president and Harvard Coach Bill Reid teaming up to save American football. On the grounds of Château de la Muette in Paris, France scientist Jean-François Pilâtre de Rozier and Marquis d'Arlandes became the first aerial travelers when they took to the sky in the first hot air balloon.
3	12	"Witchfinder General; Isabella and Ferdinand; Poisoned Rice"	March 24, 2016	635,000
Colchester Castle in Colchester, England, was where witch hunter Matthew Hopkins imprisoned and tortured several falsely accused witches in its dungeon. Alcázar de los Reyes Cristianos in Córdoba, Spain stands as a reminder of teenage heirs Princess Isabella and Prince Ferdinand who pursued their dreams of uniting the five kingdoms into one nation. Nichols-Rice-Cherry House in Houston, Texas, was once the home of the aging William Rice who was schemed by his butler and a conniving lawyer to fake the millionaire's will and take his fortune to fund a university in his name. When future king Henry V catches an arrow to the face, surgeon John Bradmore saves the prince by performing the operation with a new tool at Shrewsbury Castle in Shrewsbury, England. Hochosterwitz Castle in Launsdorf, Austria, was nearly sieged by countess Margarete Maultasch who gave up when a knight threw his only food source, an ox stuffed with barley as a ruse that she couldn't starve his people out. Meeker Mansion is where businessman Ezra Meeker came up with his plan to persevere the Oregon Trail, the same route he used to come out west, by traveling it in reverse in his covered wagon to raise money for monuments.
3	13	"Jack The Giant Killer; Last Emperor of Mexico; Saving Britain's Art "	March 31, 2016	597,000
A heart-shaped stone at St Michael's Mount in Cornwall, England, pays tribute to "Jack the Giant Killer", a young farmer's son who took on a gigantic 18-foot fearsome foe who terrorized towns and villages across the land. Chapultepec Castle in Mexico City, Mexico, becomes the home of Maximilian I when he is deceived by his ally, France's Napoleon III, who forcefully got the Mexican people to appoint the Austrian archduke as their emperor. Penrhyn Castle in Bangor, Wales became the hiding place of Britain's most prized art collection to avoid the Blitz during World War II when director of the National Gallery, Kenneth Clark and his assistant Martin Davies stored the paintings there. Ajuda National Palace in Lisbon, Portugal, is rebuilt by the royal family with the designs of architect Eugénio dos Santos, who rebuilt the city after a devastating 1755 earthquake. A detective tracks an army lieutenant to Linz Castle in Linz, Austria where, after he was snubbed at a higher rank, he decides to poison the promoted officers with cyanide pills disguised as a libido drug. Frederick Law Olmsted and British architect Calvert Vaux create Belvedere Castle in New York City after winning a landscaping contest to design Central Park.
