= Mysteries at the Museum =

Television program

- Series title
- Genre: Mystery
- Presented by: Don Wildman
- Country of origin: United States
- Original language: English
- No. of seasons: 22
- No. of episodes: 278

Production
- Executive producers: David Gerber, Nicola Moody and Dominic Stobart
- Production location: Varies
- Running time: 60 min (including commercials)
- Production company: Optomen Productions

Original release
- Network: Travel Channel
- Release: November 2, 2010 – January 27, 2019

Related
- Mysteries at the Castle; Mysteries at the National Parks; Mysteries at the Monument; Mysteries at the Hotel

Mysteries at the Museum is an hour-long television program on the Travel Channel which features museum artifacts of unusual or mysterious origins.

== Plot ==
The show's first season was hosted by Jay Thomas. Beginning season 2, Don Wildman became host. The executive producer is David Gerber and the show is produced by Optomen Productions under the executive producers Nicola Moody and Dominic Stobart.

== Episodes ==
=== Series overview ===
Season	Episodes	Originally released	
Season	Episodes	First released	Last released
1	12	November 2, 2010	January 11, 2011
2	24	October 4, 2011	July 10, 2012
3	12	November 15, 2012	March 21, 2013
4	12	August 15, 2013	November 21, 2013
5	13	January 2, 2014	April 3, 2014
6	13	September 12, 2014	December 26, 2014
7	13	April 3, 2015	June 26, 2015
8	13	October 2, 2015	January 1, 2016
9	13	April 7, 2016	June 25, 2016
10	13	July 2, 2016	September 9, 2016
11	13	September 16, 2016	December 22, 2016
12	13	September 23, 2016	December 30, 2016
13	13	January 5, 2017	May 11, 2017
14	13	February 2, 2017	April 27, 2017
15	13	February 9, 2017	July 27, 2017
16	13	August 3, 2017	November 2, 2017
17	13	October 26, 2017	February 1, 2018
18	13	February 8, 2018	April 12, 2018
19	13	February 15, 2018	August 8, 2018
20	11	June 7, 2018	November 28, 2018
21	11	July 19, 2018	November 28, 2018
22	13	November 7, 2018	January 27, 2019

=== Season 1 (2010–2011) ===
No. overall	No. in season	Title	Original release date
1	1	"Alcatraz; Enigma Machine; Real Mona Lisa"	November 2, 2010
On June 12, 1962, three convicts were missing from their cells: John Anglin, his brother Clarence, and Frank Morris. In their beds were cleverly built dummy heads made of plaster, flesh-tone paint, and real human hair that assisted in one of the most unusual prison escapes in history.
2	2	"Prehistoric Monster; 60 year old Govt. Cover Up"	November 9, 2010
Larger than life legends roaming the La Brea Tar Pits Museum. The little Bockscar that could and the fateful day that changed the course of history forever. Discover how a stone giant came to be found on a farm in Cardiff, NY. Discover how two lighting brackets were involved in one of the worst avalanche accidents in US history. Roswell is one of the hottest spots for alien encounters, but how did it happen? Ordinary dentures that belonged to an extraordinary owner.
3	3	"San Francisco Quake; Mastodon Story"	November 16, 2010
The truth behind one of the infamous kidnappings of all time. The incredible fossil at the center of a spine-chilling murder mystery. A mysterious sea creature that holds an amazing secret. A spy's treachery that changed the hearts of Americans during the cold war. The riddle of what caused one of the worst natural disasters in American history. Learn how desperate immigrants outwitted the very exam designed to keep them out of the US.
4	4	"Japanese WMD's; Houdini Statue..."	November 23, 2010
5	5	"Bonnie & Clyde Rifle; Deep Sea Fish"	November 30, 2010
6	6	"T-Rex Skeleton; Slinky & McKinley Nightshirt"	December 7, 2010
7	7	"Greensboro Lunch; Radithor; WWII U-boat"	December 14, 2010
8	8	"Rosa Parks; Eliot Ness; Bigfoot"	December 21, 2010
9	9	"Theremin; Silly Putty; Tacoma Narrows Bridge"	December 28, 2010
10	10	"Dillingers Death Mask; Frisbee; Shipwreck"	January 4, 2011
11	11	"USS Intrepid; Seattle Glue Pot; Wing Walkers"	January 11, 2011
12	12	"Concorde; Robert the Doll; Unabomber's Shack"	January 11, 2011

=== Season 2 (2011–2012) ===
No. overall	No. in season	Title	Original release date
24	12	"Flying Car; Prison Riot; Dreamland Fire"	October 4, 2011
23	11	"Lotto Scam; Somali Pirates; Haunted Plane"	October 16, 2011
22	10	"Anthrax; Marilyn Monroe; Hunley Submarine"	October 18, 2011
21	9	"Outlaw Shoes; Astrochimp; Message in a Bottle"	October 25, 2011
20	8	"LA Raid; Bioterror; Automation"	November 1, 2011
19	7	"Shrunken Heads; Greeley Expedition; Broken Arrow"	November 8, 2011
18	6	"American Spy; Belle Gunness; Oarfish"	November 15, 2011
17	5	"S.S. Eastland Disaster; Lost Gold Mine; Smuttynose Murders"	November 22, 2011
16	4	"French Connection; Shipwrecked Gold; Area 51 Plane Crash"	November 29, 2011
15	3	"Prison Experiment; Butch Cassidy Manuscript; Dueling Mammoths"	December 6, 2011
14	2	"Annabelle Doll; Bridge Collapse; Whale Attack"	December 13, 2011
13	1	"Siamese Twins; Assassin Umbrella; Capone Haunted Cell"	December 20, 2011
25	24	"Goat Gland Doctor; Legend of the Red Ghost; Easter Island"	April 17, 2012
26	23	"Roulette Computer; LA Shootout; The Brooklyn Enigma; Equitable Building Disaster; Pigeon Missile; 1918 Flu"	April 24, 2012
27	22	"Exorcism; Honey Island Swamp Monster; The Real James Bond; La Belle Shipwreck; Sgt. Stubby"	May 1, 2012
28	21	"Chowchilla Kidnapping; Texas City Disaster; Bezoar Stones"	May 8, 2012
29	19	"Hitchcock's Birds, Hope Diamond, Phineas Gage"	May 15, 2012
30	20	"Black Dahlia; French Angel; Sterling Hall Bombing"	May 22, 2012
31	18	"Lost Colony of Roanoke, Dr. Linda Hazzard, Deep Blue, Greenbrier Hotel Bunker, Death of Edgar Allan Poe, Liberty Bell 7"	May 29, 2012
32	17	"Keely's Motor, Reagan Limousine, Audubon's Mystery Book"	June 5, 2012
33	16	"Kelly-Hopkinsville Encounter, Lincoln Brass Knuckles, Pneumatic Subway, Karen Silkwood Murder"	June 12, 2012
34	15	"Boston Molasses Disaster, D.B. Cooper, Buddy Holly Curse"	June 19, 2012
35	14	"Dr. Crippen, Kinross, Shoe Bomber, the Salton Sea, the Donner Party, FDR's Cane"	June 26, 2012
36	13	"Brinks Heist, Saddam's Spider Hole, Ringdocus"	July 10, 2012

=== Season 3 (2012–2013) ===
No. overall	No. in season	Title	Original release date
37	13	"Great Train Robbery; Phoenix Lights; Santa Cruz Sea Serpent"	November 15, 2012
38	12	"Patience Worth; Space Monkey; Absinthe"	November 22, 2012
39	11	"The Conqueror's Curse; Play-Doh; Poe Murder"	November 29, 2012
40	10	"Santa Claus Heist; Long Island Heiress; Papago Park"	December 6, 2012
41	9	"Cleveland Tumor; Lions of Tsavo; Willamette Meteorite"	December 13, 2012
42	8	"Sheppton Mine Disaster; Bite Board; Erie Collar Bomb"	December 27, 2012
43	7	"St. Francis Dam; Philly the Dog; Suicide Table"	January 10, 2013
44	6	"Buried Alive; Mauve; Crash at Crush"	January 24, 2013
45	5	"Leopold and Loeb; U2 Spy Plane; Chewing Gum"	February 7, 2013
46	4	"Little Trunk of Horrors; Russian Roswell; Coney Island Baby Incubators"	February 21, 2013
47	3	"Prophet of Oak Ridge; Human Scalp; Mothman"	February 28, 2013
48	2	"MGM Fire; UFO Car; Prophecy Sword"	March 7, 2013
49	1	"Railroad Heroine; Niagara Falls Daredevil; Accidental Nuclear Bomb"	March 21, 2013

=== Season 4 (2013) ===
No. overall	No. in season	Title	Original release date
50	1	"Edison's Electric Pen; Vanishing Carroll Deering; Lizard Man"	August 15, 2013
51	2	"Operation Pastorius; Nellie Bly; Boston Strangler"	August 22, 2013
52	3	"Squeaky Fromme; Hodag; Typhoid Mary"	August 29, 2013
53	4	"The Dance That Seduced a City; Vanishing Lake; Mysterious Death of Bugsy Siegel"	September 5, 2013
54	5	"Don Bolles' Quest for the Truth; Stanley's Miraculous Snake Oil; The Infamous Northfield Raid"	September 12, 2013
55	6	"The Infamous Jersey Devil; Tank Rampage; The Mysterious Death of President Harding"	September 19, 2013
56	7	"Margery the Medium; Everest Ascent; The Pastor and the Choir Singer"	September 26, 2013
57	8	"Jack the Ripper in New York; Jim the Penman; Locust Swarm"	October 3, 2013
58	9	"East River Blowout; The Day It Rained Meat; Michigan Triangle"	October 10, 2013
59	10	"The Death of William Wood; Hacker Spy; Skunk Ape"	October 24, 2013
60	11	"Prison Experiment; The Real Noah's Ark; The Informant"	November 14, 2013
61	12	"Asylum Poisoning; Naked Joe; The Mad Bomber"	November 21, 2013

=== Season 5 (2014) ===
No. overall	No. in season	Title	Original release date
62	1	"Miracle Car; Glass Armonica; Yankee Spy"	January 2, 2014
63	2	"Strangers on a Train; Madame Tussaud; WD-40"	January 9, 2014
64	3	"Psychic Horse; Strange Story of Rubber; Pulaski Axe"	January 16, 2014
65	4	"Funhouse Mummy; Playboy's Gold; Lawn Chair in the Sky"	January 23, 2014
66	5	"Outlaw Marshall; 76 Days Adrift; Diamond Hoax"	January 30, 2014
67	6	"The Cinder Woman; Milgram Experiment; Gold Accumulator Hoax"	February 6, 2014
68	7	"The Blonde Butcher; Charley Ross Kidnapping; Southern Sasquatch"	February 20, 2014
69	8	"Failed Assassination of JFK; Max Factor; Martian Monkey"	February 27, 2014
70	9	"Civil War Prostitutes; Art Hoax; In Cold Blood"	March 6, 2014
71	10	"Baseball Stalker, Peggy Shippen, Moon Hoax"	March 13, 2014
72	11	"Annie Oakley, Project Chariot, Old State Prison Haunting"	March 20, 2014
73	12	"Damascus Missile; Eye in the Sky; Soapy Smith"	March 27, 2014
74	13	"Son of a Gun; Whale Rescue; Bottle Popping Poltergeist"	April 3, 2014

=== Season 6 (2014) ===
No. overall	No. in season	Title	Original release date
75	1	"Brassiere Brigade; Flight for Life; Connecticut Haunting"	September 12, 2014
76	2	"Circling the Skies; Lady & the Panda; 12 Years a Slave"	September 19, 2014
77	3	"Love Canal; Duquesne Spy Ring; Survival in the Colonies"	September 26, 2014
78	4	"Doyle & Houdini; the Poison Squad; the Great Imposter"	October 3, 2014
79	5	"Tootsie Roll Miracle; Singing Convict; Operation Paperclip"	October 17, 2014
80	6	"Cold War Checkmate, Radioactive Scout, Southwest Outbreak"	October 24, 2014
81	7	"Skull in the Ashes; Nazi Art Hoax; Hunger Strike"	November 14, 2014
82	8	"Mail Missile, Dare to Dream, Child Warrior"	November 21, 2014
83	9	"Robber's Bride; the Night Disco Exploded; Escape by Sea"	November 28, 2014
84	10	"Dramatic Defection; Wrong Way Flight; Cowboy's Revenge"	December 5, 2014
85	11	"The Kiss That Saved a Million Lives, Heist of the Century, Lorenzo's Oil"	December 12, 2014
86	12	"Porcelain Twins, The Warden's Wife, Lost City Of Atlantis"	December 19, 2014
87	13	"Dial M For Missing, $7 Renoir, Secret in the Attic"	December 26, 2014

=== Season 7 (2015) ===
No. overall	No. in season	Title	Original release date
88	1	"The Invention of a Cellophane, The Eruption of Mt. Edgecumbe, The King in the Parking Lot"	April 3, 2015
89	2	"Invention of the Mile High Club, The Attempted Assassination of Andrew Jackson, Zip to Zap"	April 10, 2015
90	3	"Opera Riot, Golfer Behind Enemy Lines, The Great Mail Train Robbery"	April 17, 2015
91	4	"Stolen Strad, Fall From Space, Czech Dream"	April 24, 2015
92	5	"Birth of the Road Map; Attack of the Killer Bees; Invention of the Gas Mask"	May 1, 2015
93	6	"Erno Rubik's Cube; World's First Factory; The Amphicar"	May 8, 2015
94	7	"Invention of Pop Rocks; Pinball Wizard; London Smog"	May 15, 2015
95	8	"Pike's Peak Peanut Pusher; Hollywood Holdout; Ireland's Lost Treasure"	May 22, 2015
96	9	"Peeping Tom Butler; Operation Beaver Bomb; Mother of Mother's Day"	May 29, 2015
97	10	"Cherry Sisters, President's Cow, Birth of a Riot"	June 5, 2015
98	11	"Great Kipton Train Wreck, First Inoculation, Spanish Space Suit"	June 12, 2015
99	12	"Crossword Code, Ampelmann, Brushy Bill"	June 19, 2015
100	13	"Blaschka Flowers, Ford Versus Ferrari, Lost Map"	June 26, 2015

=== Season 8 (2015–2016) ===
No. overall	No. in season	Title	Original release date
101	5	"Cellini Heist, Real Romeo and Juliet, Link to the Skies"	October 2, 2015
102	3	"Fallen Robins; Romeo Spies, All in for Poker"	October 9, 2015
103	10	"Alligators in the Sewers, Unstoppable Car, Founding Forensics"	October 16, 2015
104	6	"Forgotten Lindbergh, Fordlandia, Forest Owlet Fraud"	October 23, 2015
105	7	"Alcoholic Antidote, Reno Haven, Strange Death of President Taylor"	November 6, 2015
106	4	"Operation Migration, Sausage Duel, Around the World"	November 13, 2015
107	8	"First Female Aviator, Mysterious Metronome, Army of Two"	November 20, 2015
108	9	"Aaron Burr Conspiracy, How Gatsby Became Great, Lady With the Lamp"	November 27, 2015
109	11	"To Catch a Fake, Tiny Coffins of Edinburgh, Tjipetir Mystery"	December 4, 2015
110	12	"JFK Boat Rescue, Scheming Queen, Tiger Cage"	December 11, 2015
111	1	"Dolley Madison, Christmas Truce, Exploding Whale"	December 18, 2015
112	2	"Wild West Rumble, Sweet Smell of Success, Antiseptic Doctor"	December 25, 2015
113	13	"Revolutionary Suffragette, Tokyo Rose, Billion Dollar Will"	January 1, 2016

=== Season 9 (2016) ===
No. overall	No. in season	Title	Original release date
114	1	"Indestructible Mike, Bubble Trouble, The Penny Man"	April 7, 2016
115	2	"Carnival of Naked Animals, Melon Heads, Worst Video Game"	April 14, 2016
116	9	"Italian UFO, Doomsday Survivor, Birth of Geocaching"	April 21, 2016
117	7	"Nation of Sealand, Nantucket Sea Monster, Bandit Queen"	July 1, 2016
118	5	"Bizarre Bread, Worst Train Robbery, Legend of the Jackalope"	May 5, 2016
119	6	"The Legend of William Tell, The President's Daughter, The Chomp-Chomp Game"	May 12, 2016
120	8	"The Mysterious Death of Van Gogh, Marathon Woman, Montana Burning"	May 19, 2016
121	13	"A Father's Mission, Hilary's Yeti, Swedish Titanic"	May 20, 2016
122	3	"Great Baby Race, Citizen Hearst, Bobbie the Wonder Dog"	May 26, 2016
123	4	"Mystery of the Spinning Statue, The Unwanted Elephant, Pirates of the Me"	June 2, 2016
124	10	"Who Killed Superman; Silver Lake Sea Serpant; Wooden Horse Escape"	June 10, 2016
125	12	"Pigeon Bra; Alpine Air Rescue; Her Promised Land"	June 17, 2016
126	11	"Bobbed Hair Bandit; A Deadly Substitution; Escape From the Jungle"	June 24, 2016

=== Season 10 (2016) ===
Season 10 debuted a new opening and graphics.

No. overall	No. in season	Title	Original release date
127	1	"Dancing Plague, Tracking Santa and Annie Londonderry"	July 1, 2016
128	2	"Man Who Saved the World, Man in a Box and From the Depths of Hell"	July 8, 2016
129	3	"Yellow Fever Fiend, Angel in Bordeaux and Invention of Jaywalking"	July 15, 2016
130	4	"Arrow Stork, Terror in the Sky and Feuding Astors"	July 22, 2016
131	5	"Father of the American Cavalry, Rosa Parks of NY and Black Knight UFO"	July 29, 2016
132	6	"World's Greatest Slot Cheat; Urine Luck and the White Mouse"	August 5, 2016
133	7	"Muhammad Ali Saves the Day; Beast of Gevaudan; Before Hillary"	August 12, 2016
134	8	"Death of Michael Rockefeller; The 68 Salute; Andes Rugby Crash"	August 19, 2016
135	12	"Swimming the Channel; Bricking the Bank; And Canyon Survivor"	August 25, 2016
136	9	"Ben Franklin's Bones; Heroine of Flight 847; Doctor Zhivago Pilot"	August 26, 2016
137	10	"Millennium Heist; New Jersey Man Eater; Elvis Meets Nixon"	September 2, 2016
138	13	"Hank Williams; Glowing Soldiers; Iceman Cometh"	September 8, 2016
139	11	"Flight of the Bell; Arsenic Soup Plot; and Spring-Heeled Jack"	September 9, 2016

=== Season 11 (2016) ===
No. overall	No. in season	Title	Original release date
140	1	"Miracle on the Hudson; For the Love of Lady Liberty; Dawn of the Synth"	September 16, 2016
142	2	"The Spy That Saved Washington; The Monster in the Egg; Hatfields and McCoys"	September 29, 2016
144	3	"Boston Marathon Cheat; Beast of Bodmin; The Naked President"	October 6, 2016
146	4	"Man on Wire; Bigger is Better; Filipino Follies"	October 13, 2016
148	5	"Prehistoric Mystery Meat; Invention of TP; Antony and Cleopatra"	October 20, 2016
150	6	"White House Water; Queen of the Mist; the Real Holy Grail"	October 27, 2016
152	7	"When Twain Met Sawyer; Guardian Angels; Army of the Dead"	November 3, 2016
154	8	"Limbo for Love; Vampire's Grave; Scarlet Pimpernel of the Vatican"	November 10, 2016
156	9	"Buried Alive, Who Really Invented the Telephone and Hoover Saves Belgium"	November 17, 2016
158	10	"The Man Who Sold a Million Rocks, Party That Started a War and the Umbrella Man"	December 1, 2016
161	11	"Chain of Fools, Rocket Boys and the Cowboys That Saved Britain"	December 8, 2016
163	12	"Titanic Violin, Wicked Fungus and the Greatest Bar Bet"	December 15, 2016
164	13	"One Small Keystroke, Daring Dr. Dan and the Real Batman"	December 22, 2016

=== Season 12 (2016) ===
No. overall	No. in season	Title	Original release date
141	1	"Kidnapped Filmmaker; Pinky's Freedom Ring; Checkered Game of Life"	September 23, 2016
143	2	"Kensington Runestone; Smile! You're Being Hijacked; Harriet the Spy"	September 30, 2016
145	3	"Death of the Ice Cream Blonde; Finding Nessie; World's Worst Opera Singer"	October 7, 2016
147	4	"Hedy Lamarr's Escape; The Kray Twins; Maco Light"	October 14, 2016
149	5	"Big Eyes; Magnetic Girl; the Half-Safe"	October 21, 2016
151	6	"Tonya vs. Nancy; Shrimpy Sonar; Dumbarton Dogs"	October 28, 2016
153	7	"Fish Rain; Oil Heir Snare; Cousteau and the Aqua-Lung"	November 4, 2016
155	8	"Blowing Up the House; Beast of Bray Road; Invention of Penicillin"	November 11, 2016
157	9	"Lancelot the Unicorn, Prohibition Man, Dragon Island and Blood Rain"	November 17, 2016
159	10	"Great Snake Hunt, Minneapolis Svengali and Swimming With Sharks"	December 1, 2016
160	11	"Metal Winners, the Big Con and Operation Babylift"	December 8, 2016
162	12	"Michelangelo the Forger, Finders Keepers and Brownie Wise and the Wonderbowl"	December 15, 2016
165	13	"North Pole Expedition, Iceberg Fleet and the Minnesota Iceman"	December 30, 2016

=== Season 13 (2017) ===
No. overall	No. in season	Title	Original release date
166	1	"Swamp People, Walkie-Talkie Heist and Grant's Writing Water"	January 5, 2017
167	2	"Cupid's Bullet, the Man Who Fooled Houdini and Snail Telegraph"	January 12, 2017
168	3	"The First Super Computer, Flying Under Fire and Dighton Rock"	January 19, 2017
169	4	"King Neptune, Friday Night Bank Robber and Karluk's Last Voyage"	January 26, 2017
171	5	"Jap Herron, Hidden Rockwell and Ticket to Fly"	February 2, 2017
177	6	"Operation Mincemeat, Texas Prison Rodeo and Tully Monster"	February 23, 2017
179	7	"Reckless, Thousand Island Dressing and the Tornado"	March 2, 2017
181	8	"Evel Spirit, Dawn of the Diaper and Cliff Palace"	March 9, 2017
183	9	"Fake Breaking News, Rescue Napoleon and Ernest Bravery"	March 16, 2017
185	10	"Pony Express, Churchill's Misadventure and First Ambulance Corps"	March 23, 2017
187	11	"Riding Thunder, Warm Springs and Catcher Spy"	March 30, 2017
192	12	"Godspeed John Glenn, Canine Convict and Brace for Landing"	May 4, 2017
193	13	"Legally Haunted, Demise of the Dodo and Jersey Kaboom"	May 11, 2017

=== Season 14 (2017) ===
No. overall	No. in season	Title	Original release date
170	1	"Clever Hans, Bertha Benz and Civil War Counterfeiter"	February 2, 2017
172	2	"Terra Cotta Warriors, the Queen of Parachuting and Polish Soldier Bear"	February 9, 2017
174	3	"Mutually Assured Missteps, First Train Robbery and Declaration Discovered"	February 16, 2017
176	4	"Indestructible Jack, Volcano Rescue and Butter Sculptor"	February 23, 2017
178	5	"The Goliath Bone, Money to Burn and Self-Serve Superstore"	March 2, 2017
180	6	"Zip-Lining to Freedom, Maid Turned Spy and Jimmy Carter's UFO"	March 9, 2017
182	7	"Smokey's on Fire, Hot Hunk Lands in Small Town and Napoleon's Sick Day"	March 16, 2017
184	8	"Demon Potato, Boozy Ballot and Ouija Believe It"	March 23, 2017
186	9	"Wallenda Walks, Crazy Taxi and Rest in Peat"	March 30, 2017
188	10	"Making Michigan, Log Jammin' and the Race That Changed the World"	April 6, 2017
189	11	"Saving the Eiffel Tower, Velvet Outlaw and Space Capsule Crisis"	April 13, 2017
190	12	"Hughes Hoax, Rat Bomb and Friday Night Liars"	April 20, 2017
191	13	"The Girl Who Fell to Earth, the Real Ghostbusters and Eclipsed by Columbus"	April 27, 2017

=== Season 15 (2017) ===
No. overall	No. in season	Title	Original release date
173	1	"Amityville Haunting, Ghost Army and Fugitive Golfer"	February 9, 2017
175	2	"Judy the POW Dog, Presidential Suite and Sticky Business"	February 16, 2017
194	4	"Sword of Scotland, Operation Haylift and Swimmin's Lib"	May 18, 2017
195	3	"Long Haul Leroy, Pardo's Push and the Invention of the Cable Car"	May 25, 2017
196	5	"Battle of Palmdale, Rain Man and the Man Who Walked Around the World"	June 1, 2017
197	6	"Tennis Titan, Brooklyn Brownstone Murder and Nuclear Moon"	June 8, 2017
198	7	"Presidential Pet, Dairy Disaster and Covert Catalog"	June 15, 2017
199	8	"Shark Chaser, Haunted Harmony and 1,700-Foot Wave"	June 22, 2017
200	9	"Fire in the Hull, the Gipper's Bombshell and Electric Tricycle"	June 29, 2017
201	10	"Terrible Tommy, Airplane Abduction and the Great Blondin"	July 6, 2017
202	11	"The Kennedy Wedding Disaster, the Weeping Icon and the Red Herring"	July 13, 2017
203	12	"Flatwoods Monster, Vanishing Bus and Hacking Death's Calculator"	July 20, 2017
204	13	"Miracle Bubble, Skeletons in the Closet and Curious George"	July 27, 2017

=== Season 16 (2017) ===
No. overall	No. in season	Title	Original release date
205	1	"Alone in the Arctic, Space Shuttle MacGyver and Angelic Organ"	August 3, 2017
206	2	"Transatlantic Zeppelin, Potato Pool and the Lost Inca City"	August 10, 2017
207	3	"Miss Unsinkable, Crop Circles and Detective Goodwin"	August 17, 2017
208	4	"Project Vortex, Diamond Heist and Tinseltown, NJ"	August 24, 2017
209	5	"Mystery of Silence, Fearless Flyer and Fifty Stars"	August 31, 2017
210	6	"Eisenhower's Crazy Convoy, Criminal Measures and Canyon Adventure"	September 7, 2017
211	7	"Dewey Defeats Truman, the Real Jekyll and Hyde and Sunken Steamship Treasure"	September 14, 2017
212	8	"Winnie the Bear, Frozen Miracle and Whiskey Galore"	September 21, 2017
213	10	"Rikers Island Rescue, She Sells Sea Shells and Weathering the War"	September 28, 2017
214	9	"Beethoven's Mysterious Malady, the Great Raid and Planet X"	October 5, 2017
215	11	"Channel Champion, the Forger and Harper Method"	October 12, 2017
216	12	"Stagecoach Mary, Alaska Firestarter and Mummy Mystery"	October 19, 2017
217	13	"Coast Guard Courage, Pizza Margherita and Jump Jet"	November 2, 2017

=== Season 17 (2017–2018) ===
No. overall	No. in season	Title	Original release date
218	1	"Undercover Informant, the Black Beetle and Unexpected Artist"	October 26, 2017
219	2	"Antis the Radar Dog, Bringing Up the Baby and the Art of Murder"	November 9, 2017
220	9	"Hitler Diaries, Hobby Horse and Parting the Red Sea"	November 16, 2017
221	3	"Dorothy of Dakota, Crop Circles of the Deep and Tunnel of Love"	November 30, 2017
222	4	"How to Sell the Eiffel Tower, Killer Lake and Cinderella Girl"	December 7, 2017
223	5	"Fleeing Fidel, Murder by Shark and Inflated Feud"	December 14, 2017
224	6	"Jackie O. Saves Grand Central, Bouncing Bombs and Row Row Row Your Boat"	December 21, 2017
225	7	"Madame X, the Ultimate Chess Game and a Monster in the Valley"	December 28, 2017
226	8	"Green Goddess, Terror on Tuesday and the Real Great Escape"	January 4, 2018
227	10	"Operation Toothpaste, Case of the Kates and White River Monster"	January 11, 2018
228	11	"Sergeant Bill Goat Hero, Gilded Grudge and Osage Investigation"	January 18, 2018
229	12	"Winter War, Terror in Antarctica and First Snow Globe"	January 25, 2018
230	13	"Battle on Ice, Lost Andree Expedition and Alaskan Sea Monster"	February 1, 2018

=== Season 18 (2018) ===
No. overall	No. in season	Title	Original release date
231	1	"Ground Zero Flag, Space Suit and Pacific Codebreaker"	February 8, 2018
232	2	"Terra Australis, Operation Underworld and Heroine Hostess"	February 8, 2018
234	4	"Jefferson's Wine, First High Flyer and Stefania's Thirteen"	February 15, 2018
235	5	"Alaska Highway, Tale of Beatrix Potter and Cleopatra's Needle"	February 22, 2018
236	6	"Benny's Banner, Lost for Words and Raising Chicago"	February 22, 2018
237	7	"Dishwasher, Golden Lake and Bridge Buster"	March 1, 2018
238	3	"Dippy the Dinosaur, Golden Record and Hooverball"	March 1, 2018
242	8	"Ping-Pong Diplomacy, Blazing Steamship Rescue and Death Ray"	March 15, 2018
243	9	"Battle of the Sexes, Circus Riot and Last Train to Freedom"	March 22, 2018
244	10	"Etch A Sketch, Cowboy Bob and Pilates"	March 22, 2018
245	11	"Leonardo's Parachute, School Children's Blizzard and Muddy Discovery"	March 29, 2018
246	12	"Titanic Orphans, Plot to Kill the Pope and Magical Unicorn"	March 29, 2018
249	13	"Luckiest Lucky Cat, Voyager Emergency and Drive-In Movies"	April 12, 2018

=== Season 19 (2018) ===
No. overall	No. in season	Title	Original release date
233	4	"Nuclear Nightmare, Teddy Roosevelt's Badlands Bandits and the Movie Star and the Dead Man"	February 15, 2018
239	1	"Invention of the Doughnut, Cleopatra in a Carpet and Flight of Fancy"	March 8, 2018
240	2	"Real Life Lassie, Spy Who Went Cold and Sinking of the Andrea Doria"	March 8, 2018
241	3	"Million Dollar Dinner, Thing in the Woods and Cornstalk Colonel"	March 15, 2018
247	6	"Italian Sherlock Holmes, King of the Airwaves and Texan Takes Moscow"	April 5, 2018
248	5	"Great Panjandrum, Jesse James to the Rescue and Willig's Wager"	April 5, 2018
250	7	"Operation Paul Bunyan, the Nose Knows and the Night America Burned"	April 19, 2018
251	8	"Jakarta Incident, Toe-to-Toe in Toledo and Assassinating FDR"	April 26, 2018
252	9	"Lucky Lucca, Flathead Lake Monster and Bumbling to Berlin"	May 3, 2018
253	10	"Betty Lou Had a Great Fall, Gurdon Ghost Light and Twitch and Shout"	May 10, 2018
254	11	"Jack and the Goat, Operation Hydra and Hell on St. Helens"	May 17, 2018
255	12	"Dickens to the Rescue, Check Off to Take Off and Waterlogged Whiskers"	May 24, 2018
265	13	"Lost City of the Monkey God, Christmas Tree for Teddy and Bell Island Boom"	August 8, 2018

=== Season 20 (2018) ===
No. overall	No. in season	Title	Original release date
256	1	"Lunar Fender Bender, Opera Angels and Billiard Balls"	June 7, 2018
257	4	"Presidential Cheese, Spying Space Shuttle and Liberty in the Lake"	June 21, 2018
258	6	"Hollywood Dog, Legend of Zorro and Up in Arms"	July 5, 2018
259	5	"Jack the Ripper, Wooden Money and Deadly Decor"	July 12, 2018
262	3	"China Clipper, Phantom Island and Dueling Dandy"	August 1, 2018
267	2	"Ghost Ship, Bobsledding and Handel's Heartstopper"	August 15, 2018
269	7	"Missing Toe Murderer, Air Locked Out and Trenches Terror"	August 22, 2018
270	8	"Terror Ship, Wicked Stepmother and Message in a Bottle"	August 29, 2018
271	9	"Lord Lucan, World's Greatest Drag Racer and Lighthouse Lifesaver"	September 5, 2018
272	10	"Frightening Foo Fighters, Bird's Eye Spy and Coral Castle Mystery"	September 12, 2018
277	11	"Buffalo Bill Burial Riddle, First Dino Egg and Arctic Murder Mystery"	November 28, 2018

=== Season 21 (2018) ===
No. overall	No. in season	Title	Original release date
260	2	"Cat's Best Friend, Sunken Treasure and Raining Frogs"	July 19, 2018
261	3	"Sandwich in Space, Watergate Crash and Blenda's Banquet"	July 26, 2018
263	4	"Titanic Hustle, Sherlock to the Rescue and America's Greatest Athlete"	August 1, 2018
264	1	"Columbus and the Mermaid, Skyscraper Snafu and Stealing the Show"	August 8, 2018
266	6	"Roosevelt's War on Words, Dragon Slayer and Cheese Puffs"	August 15, 2018
268	5	"Terror on the Tracks, the Ape and the Child and Body in the Bog"	August 22, 2018
273	7	"Titanic Baker, Psychic Scammer and Cuban Swimmer Crisis"	September 19, 2018
274	8	"The Ghost of Katie King, Lake Erie Monster and Secret Stowaway"	September 26, 2018
275	9	"Killer Space Germs, The Yeti's Hand and The Bug That Changed History"	October 3, 2018
276	10	"Murder at Greystone, Paulding Light and Tumbleweed Tycoon"	October 10, 2018
278	11	"Geostorm Inferno, The Typo That Won the War and The Death of Princess Di"	November 28, 2018

=== Season 22 (2018) ===
No. overall	No. in season	Title	Original release date
279	1	"Doppelgangers, Salem's Curse and White House Attack"	November 7, 2018
280	2	"Knocking Ghost, Superman Saves the Day and Sleeping Dragon"	November 14, 2018
281	4	"Woolly Mystery, Snow Spirit and Killer Cola"	December 12, 2018
282	5	"Lincoln's Curse, The Fatberg and Red Meat Riddle"	December 19, 2018
283	6	"Demon Cat, Murderer on Board and Nevada Giant"	December 26, 2018
284	7	"Borrego Sandman, Axeman of New Orleans and Arctic Ghost Ship"	January 2, 2019
285	8	"Resurrection Mary, Nightclub Blaze Whodunit and Wedding Sting"	January 9, 2019
286	9	"Dark Lighthouse, Possessed by Murder and Loveland Frogman"	January 9, 2019
287	10	"Broken Arrow Hero, Heartbreak Haunt and Smoke Jumpers"	January 13, 2019
288	11	"Spaceship on the Beach, Boogie Bomb and Wyatt Earp's Great Escape"	January 13, 2019
289	12	"Serial Mourner, Glacier Inferno and Desert Giants"	January 20, 2019
290	13	"Oakland Poltergeist, King Tut's Alien Jewel and Cursed Castle"	January 27, 2019

=== Specials ===
In the specials, Don Wildman personally visits sites and views artifacts related to a single subject.

Special no.	Title	Original release date
1	"Unsolved Cases: Mysteries at the Museum"	February 28, 2012
2	"Best of: Mysteries at the Museum"	March 6, 2012
3	"Most Extreme: Mysteries at the Museum"	March 13, 2012
4	"Monumental Mysteries: Mysteries at the Museum"	July 17, 2012
5	"Out Of This World: Mysteries at the Museum"	August 21, 2012
6	"Secrets Of New England: Mysteries at the Museum"	August 28, 2012
7	"Freakiest: Mysteries at the Museum"	September 4, 2012
8	"Deadliest: Mysteries at the Museum"	September 11, 2012
9	"Conspiracies: Mysteries at the Museum"	September 18, 2012
10	"Most Notorious: Mysteries at the Museum"	September 25, 2012
11	"Ultimate Adventures: Mysteries at the Museum"	March 28, 2013
12	"Unexplained: Mysteries at the Museum"	April 4, 2013
13	"Most Iconic: Mysteries at the Museum"	April 11, 2013
14	"Secrets Of The South: Mysteries at the Museum"	April 18, 2013
15	"Creepiest: Mysteries at the Museum"	April 25, 2013
16	"Most Scandalous: Mysteries at the Museum"	May 2, 2013
17	"Halloween Special: Mysteries at the Museum"	October 17, 2013
18	"Pioneers: Mysteries at the Museum"	November 13, 2013
19	"Spine Tingling: Mysteries at the Museum"	December 5, 2013
20	"Secrets Of D.C: Mysteries at the Museum"	December 12, 2013
21	"Unbelievable: Mysteries at the Museum"	December 19, 2013
22	"Cloaked In Secrecy: Mysteries at the Museum"	April 17, 2014
23	"Trailblazers: Mysteries at the Museum"	May 1, 2014
24	"Secrets of Chicago: Mysteries at the Museum"	May 8, 2014
25	"Weirdest Weapons: Mysteries at the Museum"	May 15, 2014
26	"Most Explosive: Mysteries at the Museum"	May 29, 2014
27	"Secrets of Las Vegas: Mysteries at the Museum"	May 14, 2015
28	"Death Defying: Mysteries at the Museum"	May 21, 2015
29	"Iconic L.A: Mysteries at the Museum"	May 28, 2015
30	"Amazing Discoveries: Mysteries at the Museum"	June 4, 2015
31	"Forgotten Heroes: Mysteries at the Museum"	June 11, 2015
32	"Incredible Creatures: Mysteries at the Museum"	June 19, 2015
33	"Mind Blowing: Mysteries at the Museum"	July 2, 2015
34	"Notorious New York: Mysteries at the Museum"	July 9, 2015
35	"Undercover: Mysteries at the Museum"	July 16, 2015
36	"Unearthed: Mysteries at the Museum"	July 23, 2015
37	"Space Race: Mysteries at the Museum"	December 8, 2016
38	"Wild West: Mysteries at the Museum"	December 15, 2016
39	"Titanic: Mysteries at the Museum"	December 29, 2016
40	"Alcatraz: Mysteries at the Museum"	January 5, 2017
41	"The White House: Mysteries at the Museum"	January 12, 2017
42	"Dinosaurs: Mysteries at the Museum"	January 19, 2017
43	"King Tut: Mysteries at the Museum"	January 26, 2017
44	"Record Breakers: Mysteries at the Museum"	May 18, 2017
45	"Blast From The Past: Mysteries at the Museum"	May 25, 2017
46	"Lost Civilizations: Mysteries at the Museum"	June 1, 2017
47	"Animal Heroes: Mysteries at the Museum"	June 8, 2017
48	"Hoaxes: Mysteries at the Museum"	June 15, 2017
49	"Vampires: Mysteries at the Museum"	October 5, 2017
50	"Rivals: Mysteries at the Museum"	October 12, 2017
51	"White House Follies: Mysteries at the Museum"	October 19, 2017
52	"Great Escapes: Mysteries at the Museum"	October 26, 2017
53	"Race to the Antarctic: Mysteries at the Museum"	December 28, 2017
54	"Andes Rescue: Mysteries at the Museum"	January 4, 2018
55	"Lincoln Assassination: Mysteries at the Museum"	January 11, 2018
56	"Manhattan Project: Mysteries at the Museum"	January 18, 2018
57	"Battle of Little Bighorn: Mysteries at the Museum"	January 25, 2018
58	"American Mobster: Mysteries at the Museum"	February 1, 2018
59	"Lindbergh Kidnapping: Mysteries at the Museum"	May 31, 2018
60	"Cold War Secrets: Mysteries at the Museum"	June 14, 2018
61	"Cleopatra: Mysteries at the Museum"	June 28, 2018
62	"Space Race: Mysteries at the Museum"	July 12, 2018
63	"Special: Zodiac Killer"	October 3, 2018

== Legacy ==
Mysteries at the Museum is a successful series, and spawned a spin-off from its Monumental Mysteries: A Mysteries at the Museum Special called Monumental Mysteries. Monumental Mysteries and two other Travel Channel series called Hotel Secrets & Legends and Castle Secrets & Legends have been renamed Mysteries at the Monument, Mysteries at the Hotel, and Mysteries at the Castle, respectively, to capitalize on the Mysteries at the Museum name. A conspiracy show called Mysteries at the National Parks has also been developed and broadcast. The show also spawned a series of specials such as the Greatest Mysteries specials.
