= Kölner Domchor =

German boys' choir at Cologne Cathedral

- Mixed boys' choir
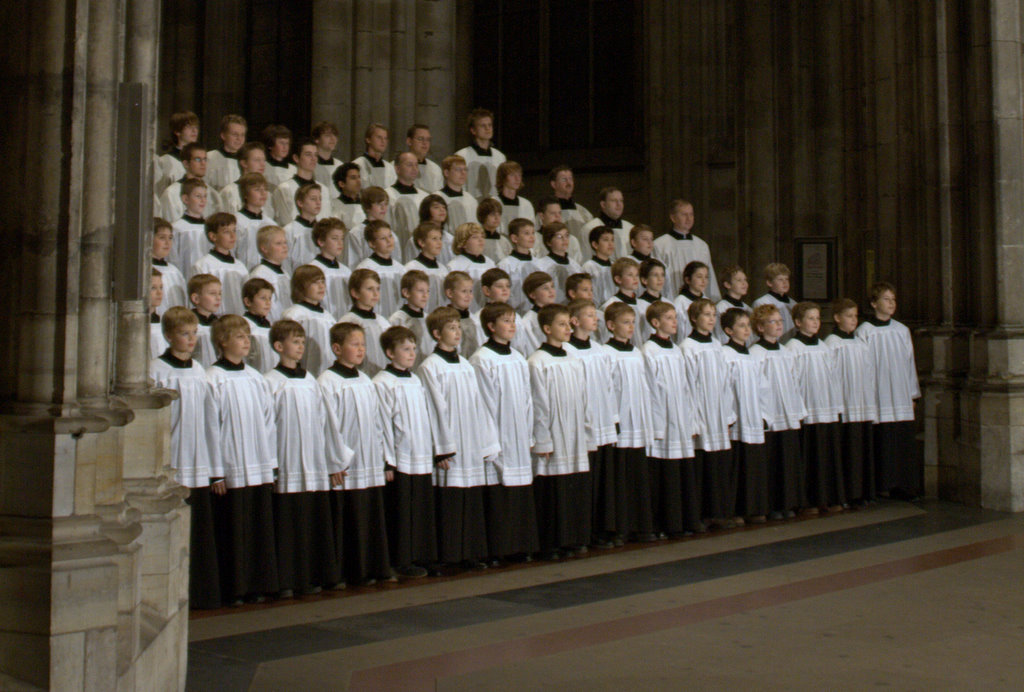
- Origin: Cologne Cathedral
- Founded: 1863
- Chief conductor: Alexander Niehues
- Website: www.koelner-dommusik.de/choere/koelner-domchor

The Kölner Domchor (Cologne Cathedral Choir) is the boys' choir at the Cologne Cathedral, officially founded in 1863. The choir rehearses three times per week. They perform regularly in services at the cathedral, and in concerts there and on international tours, including to Rome and the United States. The choir has been successful at choral competitions.

== History ==
Choral singing had been present at the cathedral for centuries, but the Kölner Domchor was officially re-established in 1863, first performing in public on 1 November in a service with the Missa super Dixit Maria by Hans Leo Hassler and the offertory hymn O quam gloriosum by Tomás Luis de Victoria. The boys rehearse three times per week at the Kardinal-Höffner-Haus for regular performances in services at the cathedral, and for concerts there and internationally. Their broad repertoire ranges from Renaissance and Baroque music to contemporary music. They have collaborated with ensembles of historically informed performance such as Concerto Köln and Neue Düsseldorfer Hofmusik. They have performed, at times with the girls' choir at the cathedral, with Cologne institutions such as Kölner Philharmonie, Cologne Opera, Westdeutscher Rundfunk, and choirs and orchestras of the region.

The choir has been successful at national and international competitions, including the Deutscher Chorwettbewerb, being awarded the first prize in the category boys' choirs in 2002.

The Kölner Domchor is a member of the international Pueri Cantores, an organisation for Catholic choirs for children and young people. In 2004, their choral festival was held at the Cologne Cathedral with around 6,000 young singers.

On the occasion of the group's 150th anniversary, on 1 November 2013, they repeated the two compositions that had been sung for the first performance. The choir was dedicated as a gift a composition commissioned for the occasion, Naji Hakim's setting of Psalm 122, Laetatus sum (I was glad). It was written for a four-part choir, two organs and optionally the cathedral's Pretiosa bell.

== Tours ==
The first transatlantic tour of the Kölner Domchor was in 2002 to the United States and Canada. A 2003 tour went to Erfurt, Dresden, Leipzig and Prague. The choir sang at the festival of the Fondazione Pro Musica e Arte Sacra in Rome three times, in 2003 Bach's St John Passion, in 2006 a Mozart program, and in 2013, when Pope Francis from Buenos Aires took office, Palmeri's Misa a Buenos Aires. Palmeri was the pianist for the performance with members of the Gürzenich Orchestra. The concert was the opening of the 12th edition of the festival, dedicated to Pope Francis. They performed in Israel first, together with the girls' choir, around New Year's Day 2005. In 2017 the choir travelled to South America, performing in Buenos Aires and Rio de Janeiro.

== Recordings ==
The first surviving recording of the Kölner Domchor dates from 1905, a shellac disc with pieces by Giovanni Pierluigi da Palestrina, conducted by Karl Cohen.

== Domkapellmeister ==
Known people who held the position of Domkapellmeister since 1700 include:

- Carl Rosier (1699–1725)
- Theodor Eltz (1748–1770)
- Joseph Aloys Schmittbaur (1775–1777)
- Franz Ignaz Kaa (1777–1803)
- Carl Leibl (1826–1863)
- Friedrich Koenen (1863–1881)
- Karl Cohen (1881–1909)
- Johannes Schulte (1909–1921)
- Johannes Mölders (1921–1943)
- Adolf Wendel (1948–1977)
- Karl-Heinz Obernier (1975–1977)
- Ralph S. March (1978–1987)
- Eberhard Metternich (1987-2025)
- Alexander Niehues (from 2025)
