= Limburg an der Lahn =

- Town
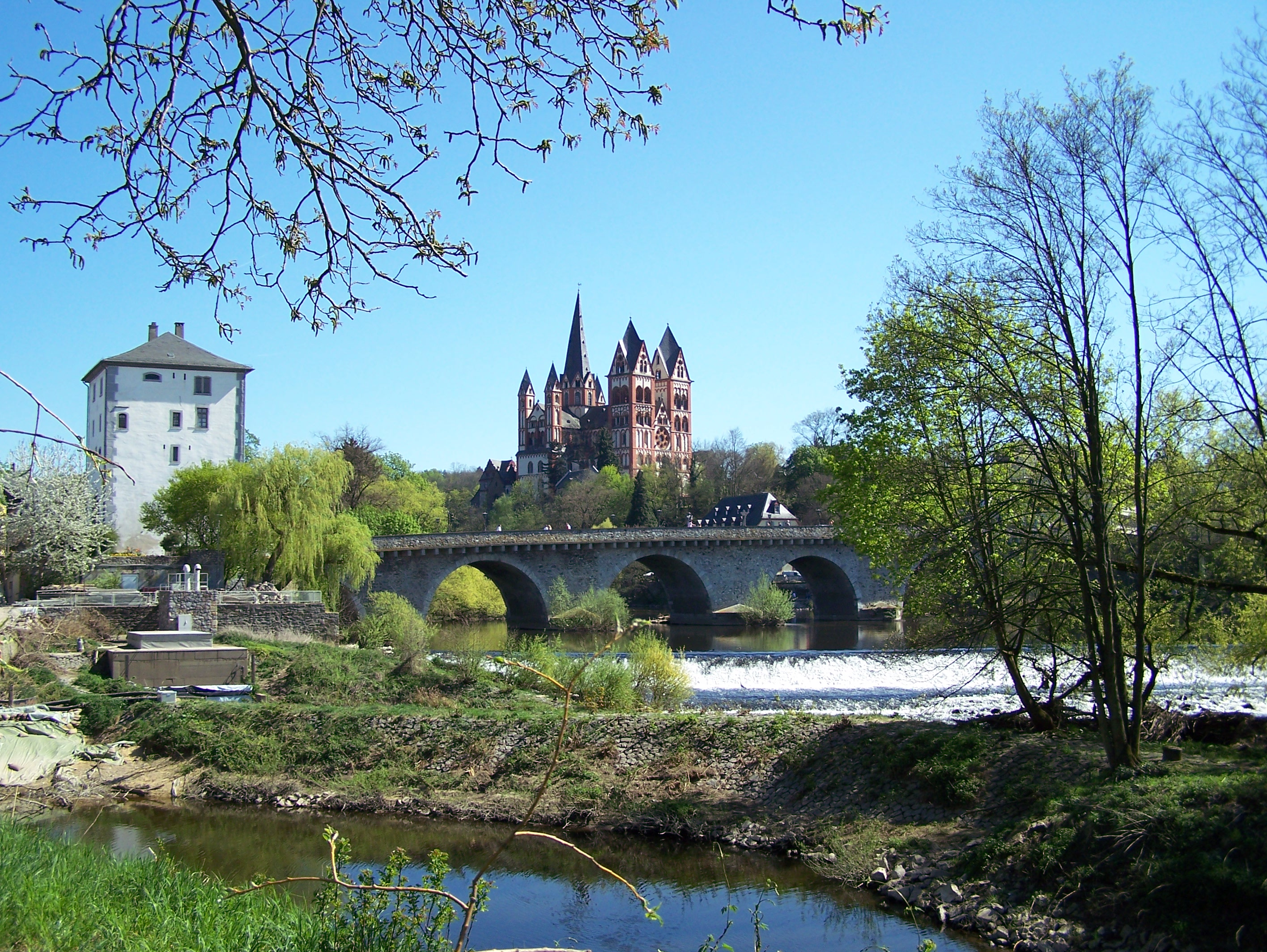
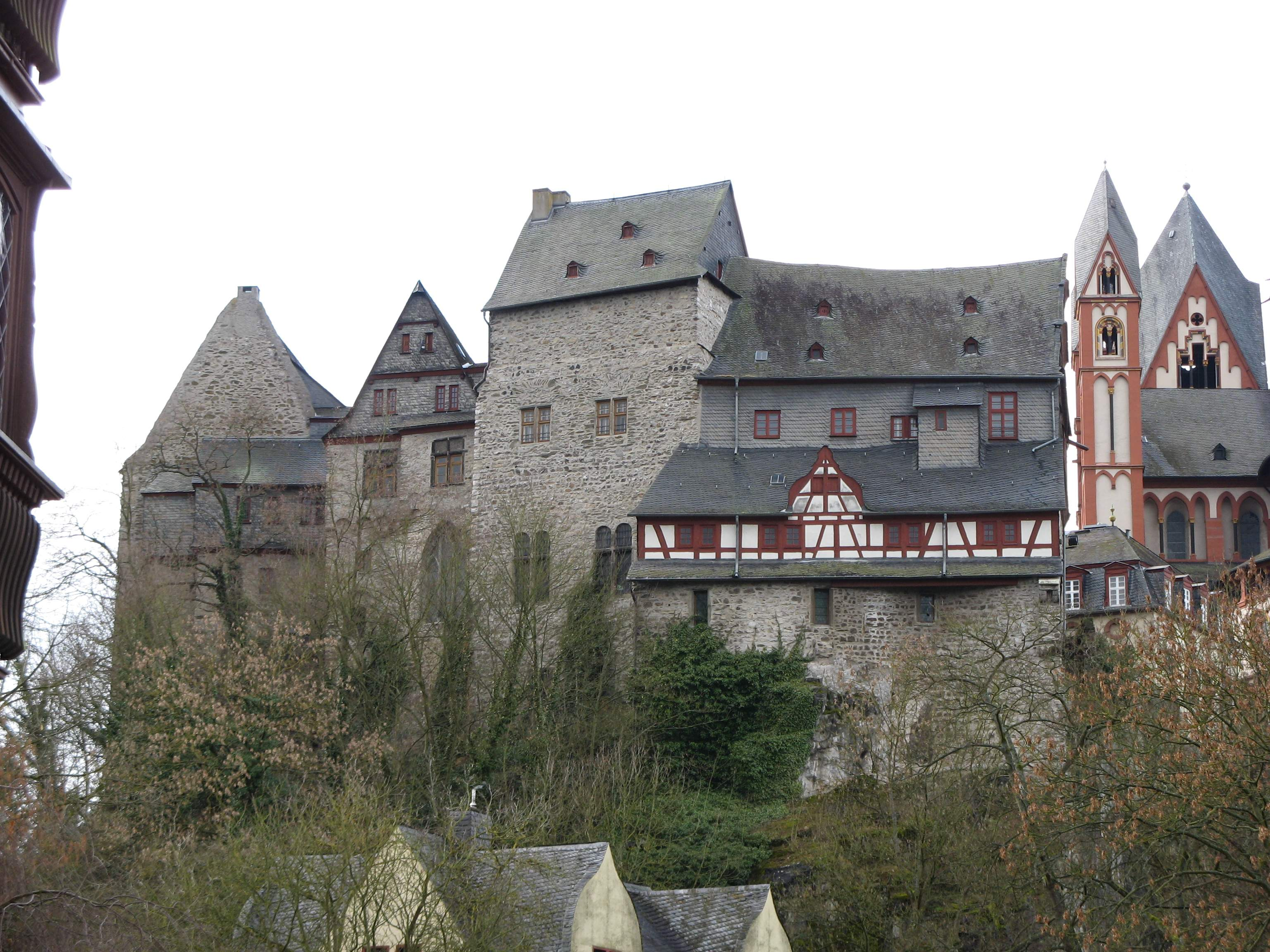
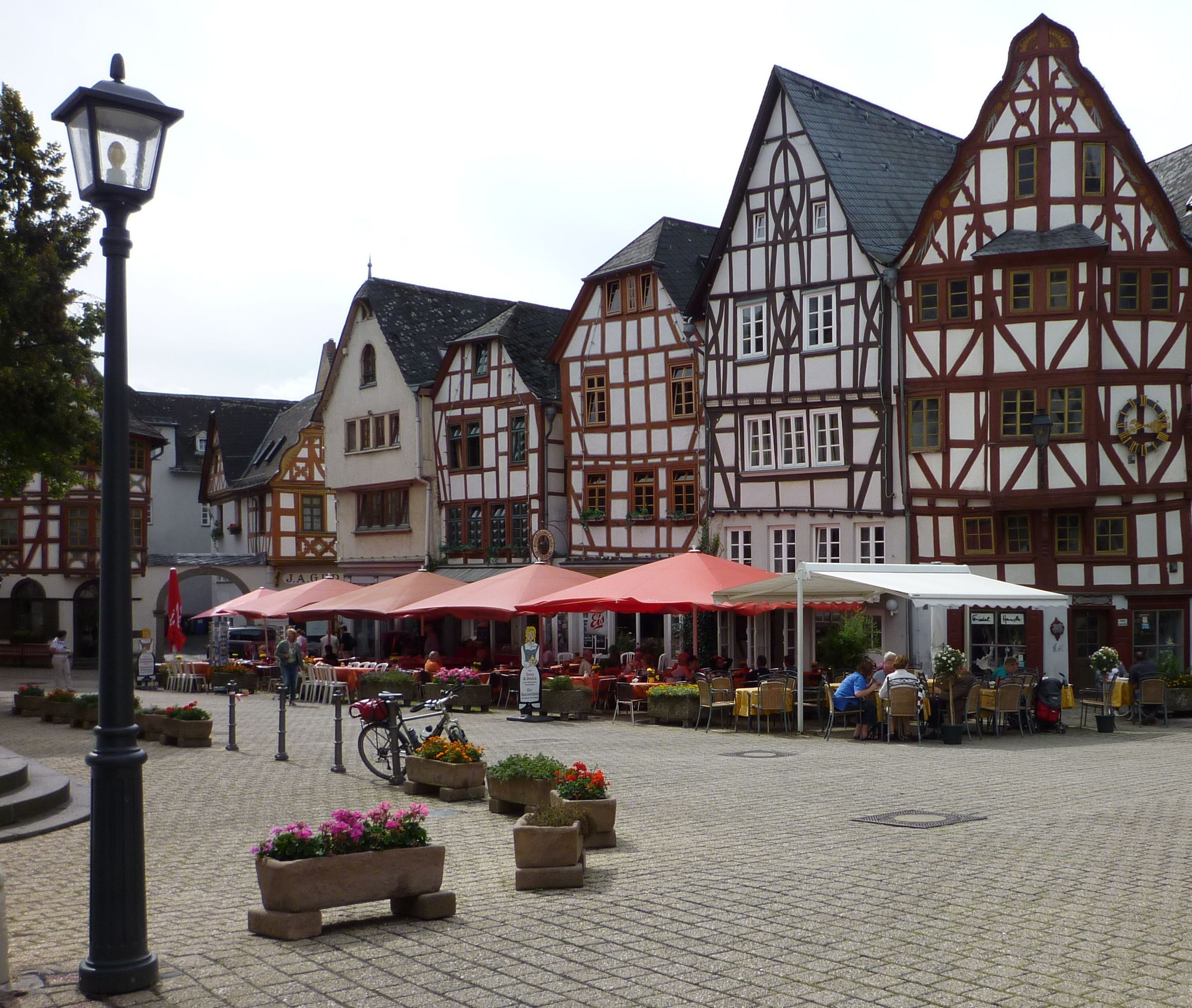
- Limburg Cathedral with the old Lahn bridge Limburg Castle Old town

- Flag Coat of arms

- Location of Limburg an der Lahn within Limburg-Weilburg district
- Interactive map of Limburg an der Lahn
- Location within Germany Location within Hesse
- Coordinates: 50°23′N 8°4′E
- Country: Germany
- State: Hesse
- Admin. region: Giessen
- District: Limburg-Weilburg

Government
  - Mayor (2021–27): Marius Hahn (SPD)

Area
  - Total: 45.16 km^{2} (17.44 sq mi)
- Elevation: 117 m (384 ft)

Population (2025-12-31)
  - Total: 35,802
  - Density: 792.8/km^{2} (2,053/sq mi)
- Time zone: UTC+01:00 (CET)
  - Summer (DST): UTC+02:00 (CEST)
- Postal codes: 65549–65556
- Dialling codes: 06431, 06433 (Ahlbach)
- Vehicle registration: LM, WEL
- Website: www.limburg.de

Limburg an der Lahn (German pronunciation: [ˈlɪmbʊʁk ʔan deːɐ̯ ˈlaːn], lit. 'Limburg on the Lahn'; officially abbreviated Limburg a. d. Lahn) is the district seat of Limburg-Weilburg in Hesse, Germany.

== Geography ==
=== Location ===
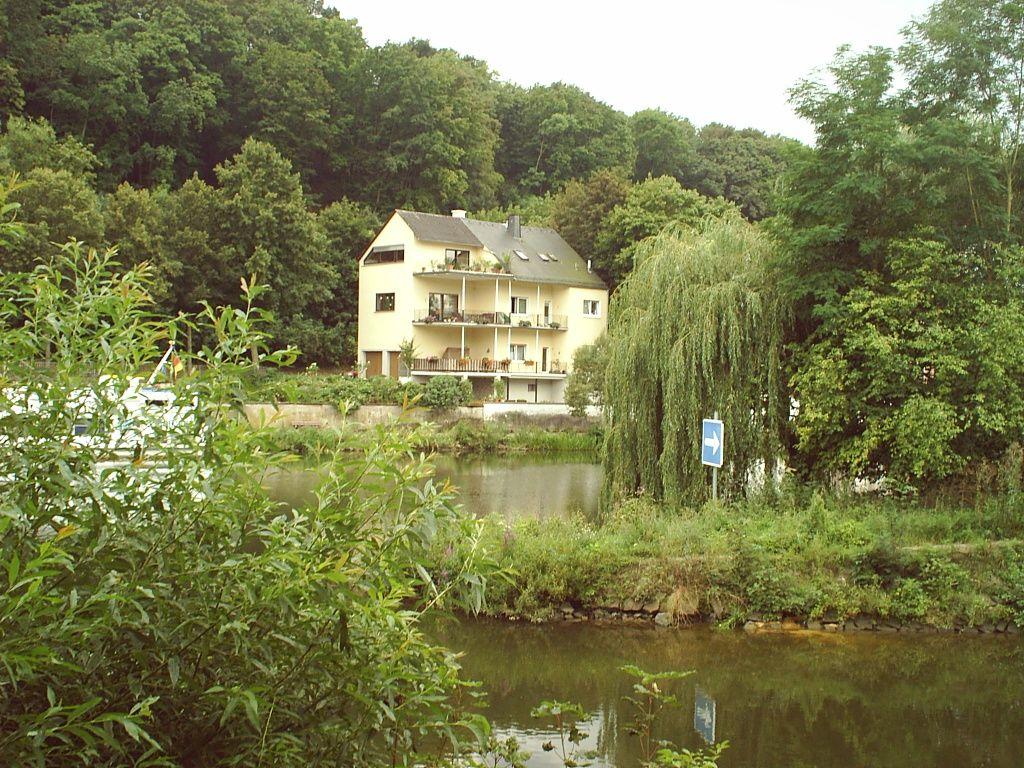
The river Lahn in Limburg

Limburg lies in western Hessen between the Taunus and the Westerwald on the river Lahn.

The town lies roughly centrally in a basin within the Rhenish Slate Mountains which is surrounded by the low ranges of the Taunus and Westerwald and called the Limburg Basin (Limburger Becken). Owing to the favourable soil and climate, the Limburg Basin stands as one of Hesse's richest agricultural regions and moreover, with its convenient Lahn crossing, it has been of great importance to transport since the Middle Ages. Within the basin, the Lahn's otherwise rather narrow lower valley broadens out noticeably, making Limburg's mean elevation only 117 m above sea level.

=== Neighbouring communities ===
Limburg forms, together with the town of Diez, a middle centre (in terms of Central place theory) but partially functions as an upper centre to western Middle Hesse.

Limburg's residential neighbourhoods reach beyond the town limits; the neighbouring centres of Elz and Diez run seamlessly together.

Surrounding towns and communities are the community of Elz and the town of Hadamar in the north, the community of Beselich in the northeast, the town of Runkel in the east, the communities of Villmar and Brechen in the southeast, the community of Hünfelden in the south (all in Limburg-Weilburg), the community of Holzheim in the southwest, and the town of Diez and the communities of Aull and Gückingen in the west (all in the Rhein-Lahn-Kreis in Rhineland-Palatinate).

The nearest major cities are Wetzlar and Gießen to the north east, Wiesbaden and Frankfurt to the south and Koblenz to the west.

=== Constituent communities ===
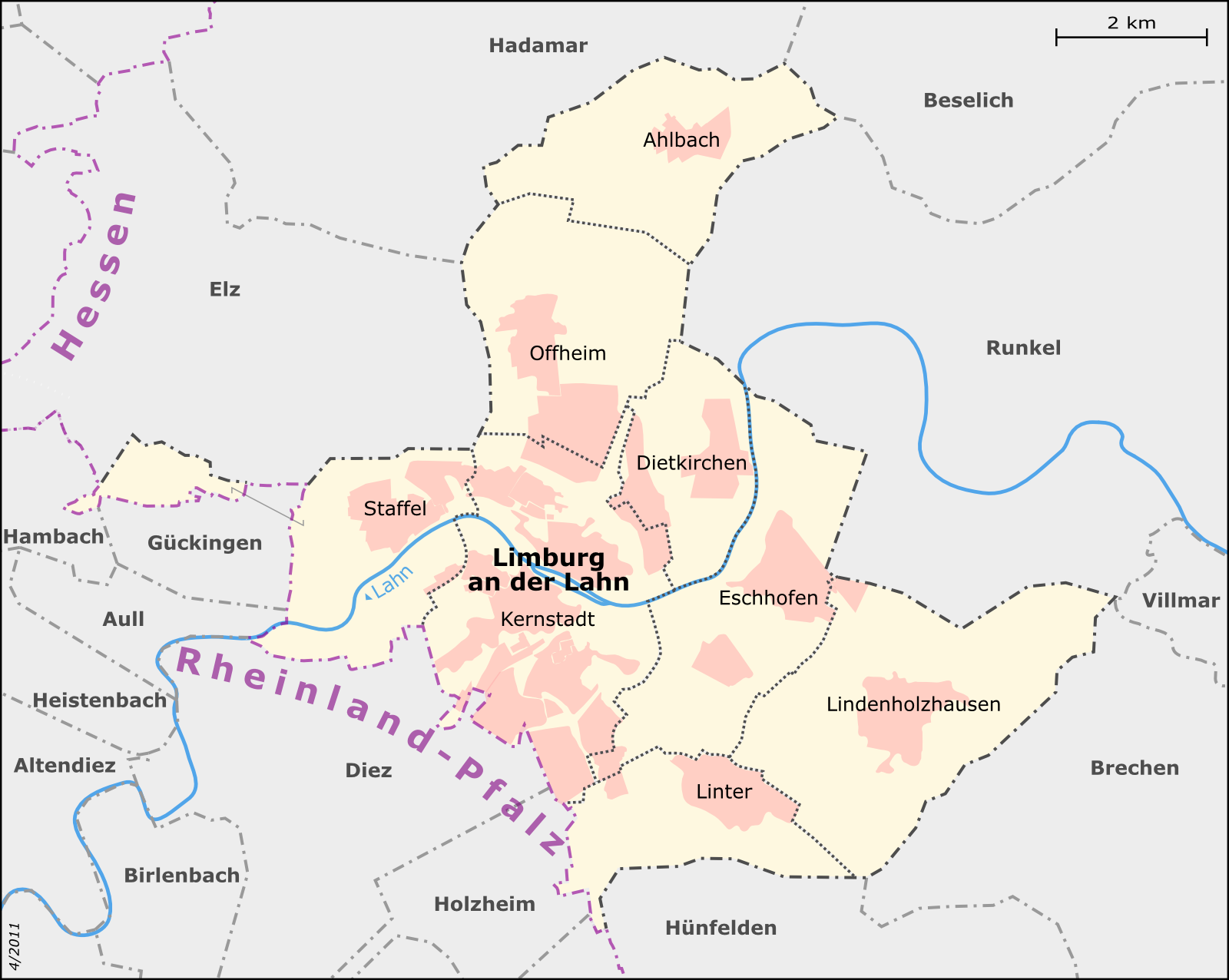
Map of Limburg and its constituent communities

The town consists of eight formerly autonomous Ortsbezirke or boroughs, listed here by population (as of 2020):

1. Limburg: 19,401
2. Lindenholzhausen: 3,315
3. Linter: 3,080
4. Eschhofen: 2,789
5. Staffel: 2,762
6. Offheim: 2,608
7. Dietkirchen: 1,630
8. Ahlbach: 1,252

Each Ortsbezirk is represented by a council. Blumenrod is also often called a constituent community, although this is actually only a big residential neighbourhood in the main town's south end. Its landmark is the Domäne Blumenrod, a former manor house that has been restored and remodelled by the Limburg Free Evangelical community.

Limburg's biggest outlying centre is Lindenholzhausen (3,315 residents as of June 2020); the second biggest is Linter.

== Etymology ==
The derivation of the name "Limburg" is not quite clear and may well derive from a local castle (Burg means "castle" in German). In 910 the town was first mentioned as Lintpurc. Two of the popular theories are:

- The name was chosen because of the close proximity to the Linterer Bach, a former stream in Linter that has now run dry and that emptied into the Lahn at the Domfelsen (crag). Linda is the Gaulish word for water.
- Rather unlikely but very popular is the connection to a dragon saga (see Lindworm) and the connection with the Stift of Saint George the "Dragon Slayer" founded in Limburg. However, the monastery was built after the castle and founded around the time of the first written mention of the name.

== History ==
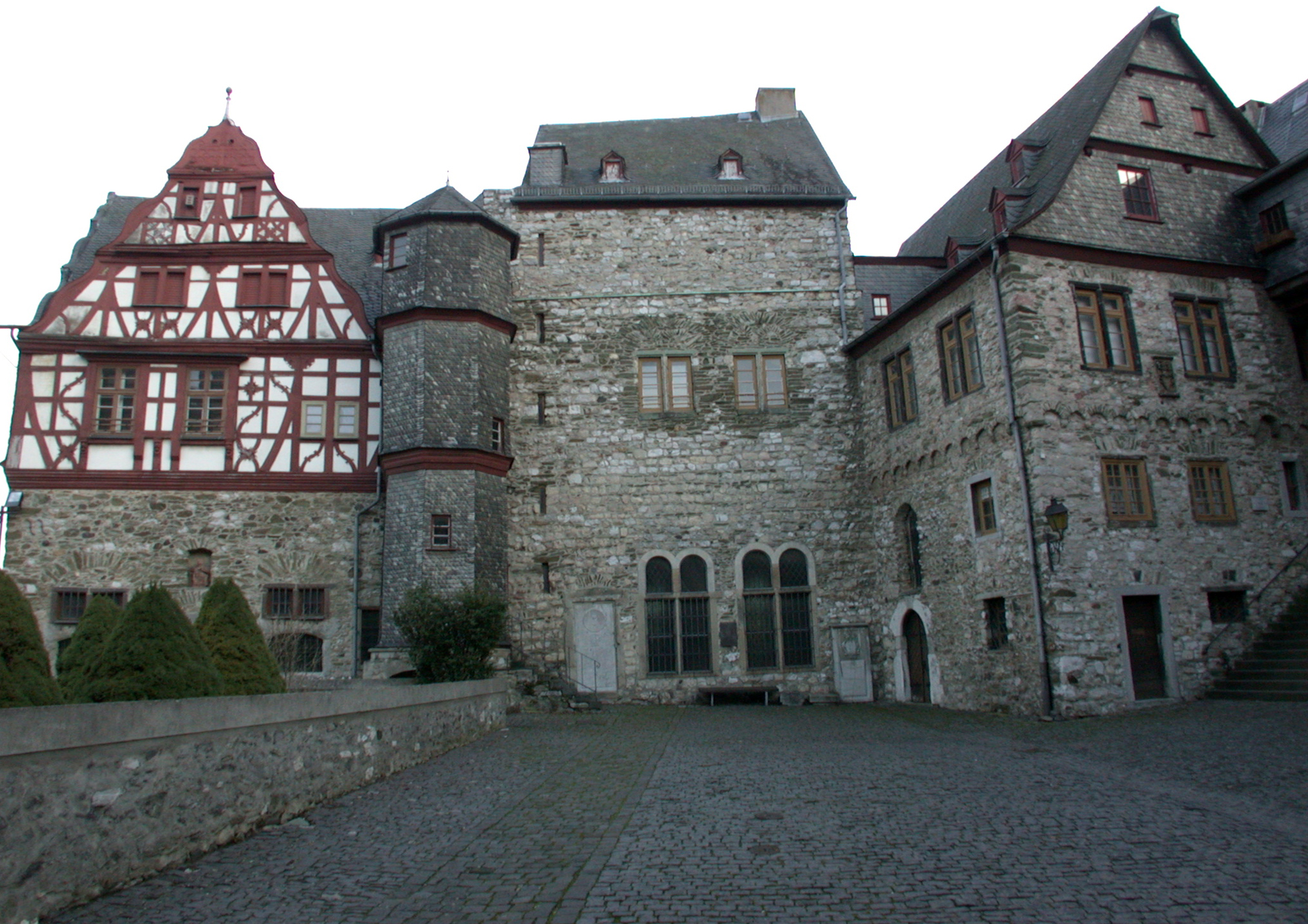
The oldest preserved section of the Limburg Castle, seen from the courtyard

About 800 A.D., the first castle buildings arose on the Limburg crags. This was probably designed for the protection of a ford over the river Lahn. In the decades that followed, the town developed under the castle's protection. Limburg is first mentioned in documents in 910 under the name of Lintpurc when Louis the Child granted Konrad Kurzbold an estate in the community on which he was to build a church. Konrad Kurzbold laid the foundation stone for Saint George's Monastery Church, where he was also buried. The community soon increased in importance with the monastery's founding and profited from the lively goods trade on the Via Publica.

In 1150, a wooden bridge was built across the Lahn. The long-distance road from Cologne to Frankfurt am Main subsequently ran through Limburg. In the early 13th century, Limburg Castle was built in its current form. Shortly afterwards, the town passed into the ownership of the Lords of Ysenburg. In 1214, the community was granted town rights. Remains of the fortification wall from the years 1130, 1230 and 1340 with a maximum length of roughly one thousand metres indicate to this day the blossoming town's quick development in the Middle Ages. There is proof of a mint in Limburg in 1180.

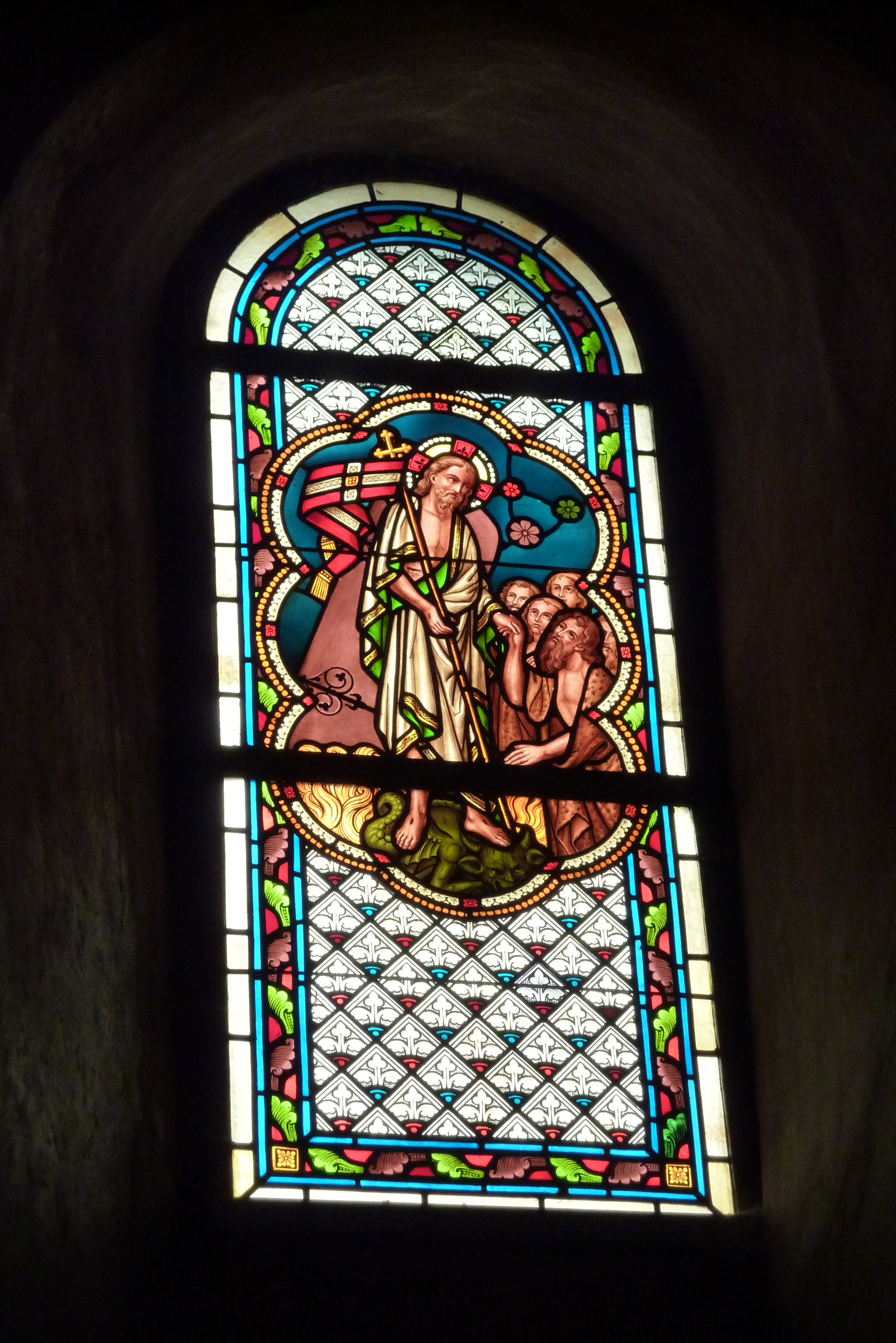
Mediaeval window at the back of the cathedral (peristyle)

One line of the Lords of Ysenburg resided from 1258 to 1406 at Limburg Castle and took their name from their seat, Limburg. From this line came the House of Limburg-Stirum and also Imagina of Isenburg-Limburg, the wife of the German King Adolf.

The ruling class among the mediaeval townsfolk were rich merchant families whose houses stood right near the castle tower and were surrounded by the first town wall once it was built. The area of today's Rossmarkt ("Horse Market"), in which many simple craftsmen lived, was only brought within the fortifications once the second town wall was built. The inhabitants there, however, unlike the merchant élite, were accorded no entitlement to a voice in town affairs and were not allowed to send representatives to the town council. Nevertheless, they had to bear the main financial burden of running the town. Only in 1458 were they allowed to send two representatives to town council.

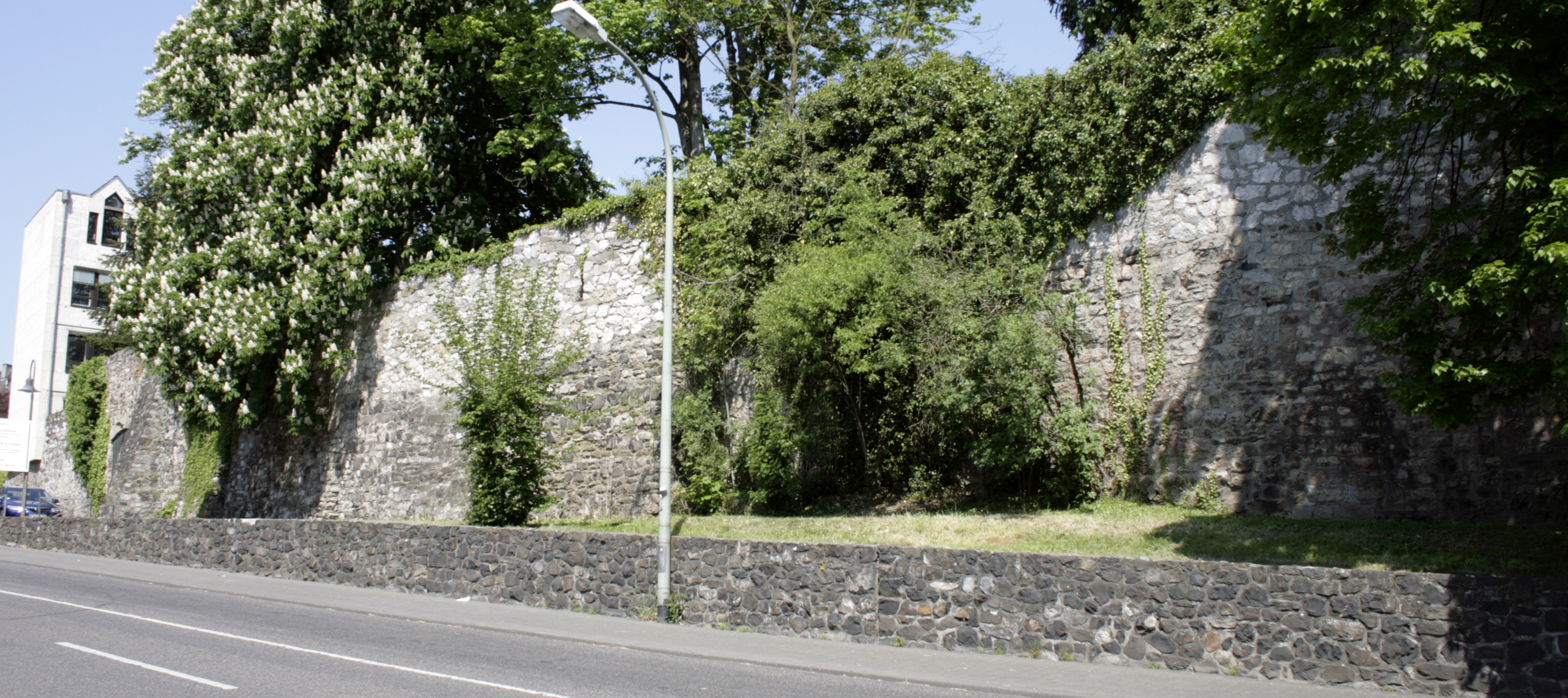
Remains of the town wall on Eschhöfer Weg

Saint George's Cathedral (Sankt-Georgs-Dom) built on the old monastery church's site, and also called Georgsdom, was consecrated in 1235. On 14 May 1289, a devastating fire wiped out great parts of the inner town, although these were subsequently rebuilt. One of the houses built at that time was the Römer 2-4-6, which is today one of Germany's oldest half-timbered houses. In 1337, Limburg's Jews were expelled from the town. Only in 1341 were they once again able to settle in the town, by royal decree. In 1344 a half share of the town was pledged to the Electorate of Trier, and in 1420, the town passed wholly into the ownership of Trier. This event, along with another town fire in 1342, the Black Death in 1349, 1356 and 1365, but above all the rise of the Territorial Princes, led to a gradual decline. In 1315 and 1346, the old stone Lahn Bridge was built (presumably in two sections).

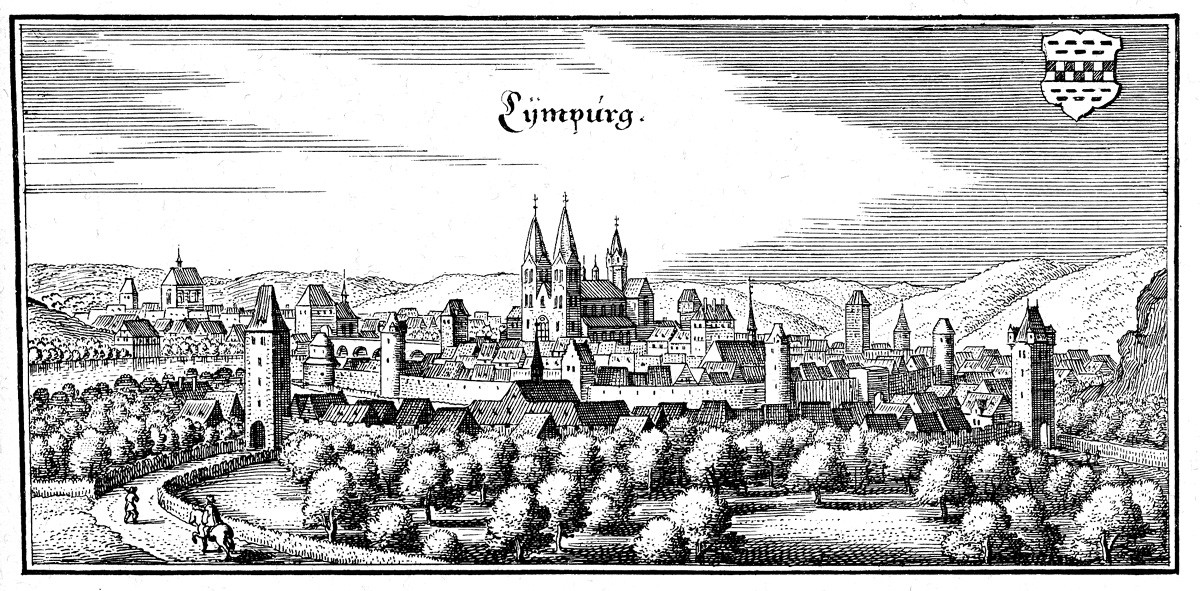
Limburg – extract from the Topographia Hassiae by Matthäus Merian 1655

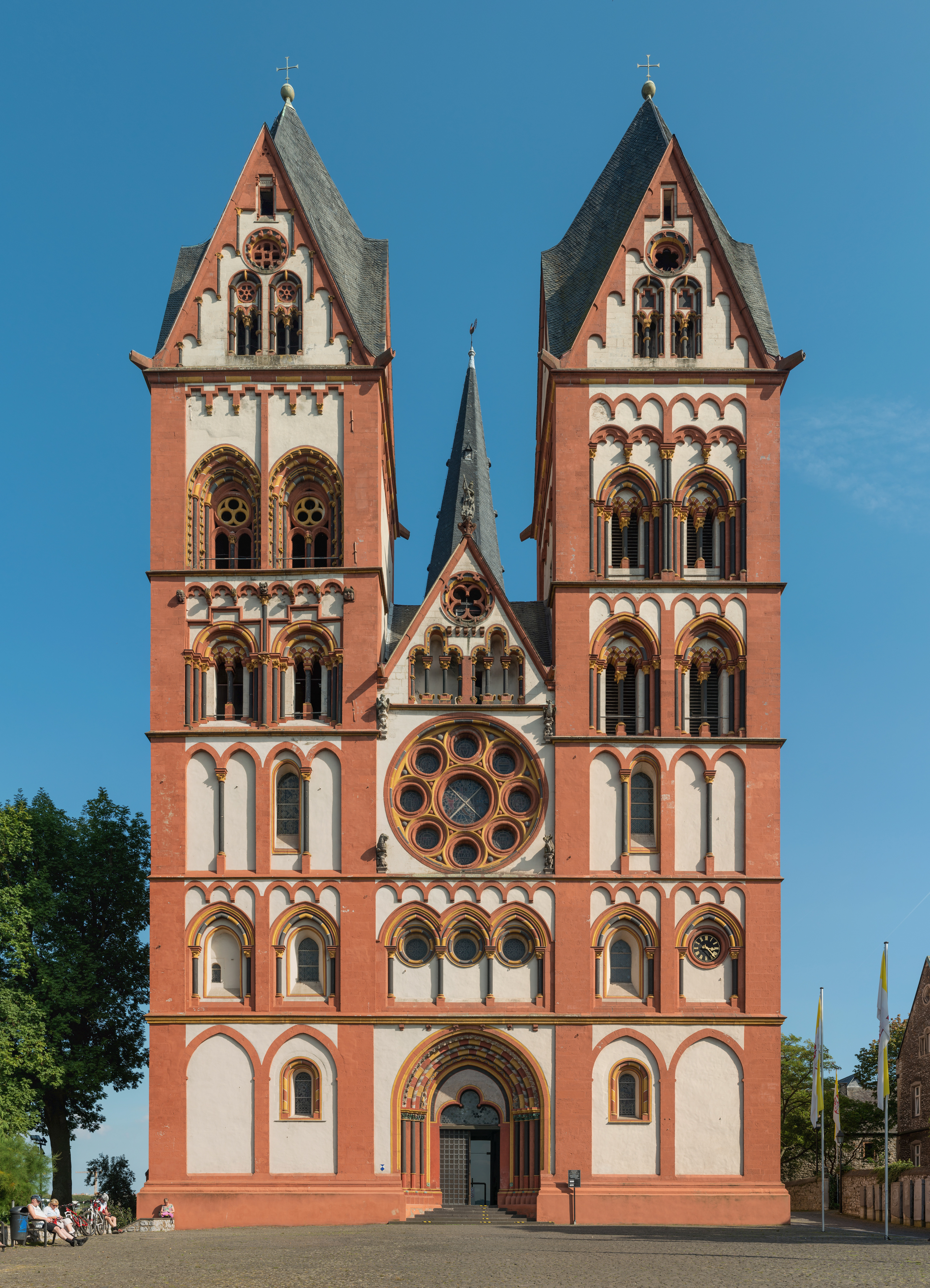
Saint George's Cathedral today

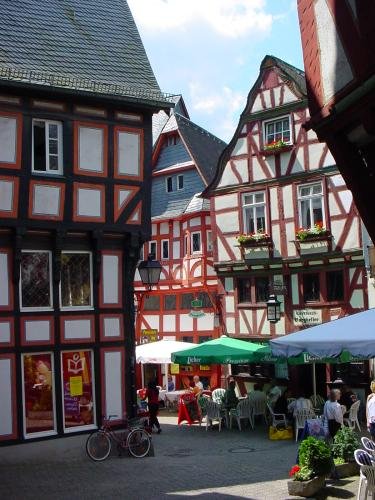
Old Town

Against the background of the German Peasants' War, unrest also arose among the townsfolk in 1525. After the Elector of Trier had demanded that the townsmen turn a Lutheran preacher out of the town, a board made up of townsmen who were ineligible for council functions handed the council a 30-point comprehensive list of demands on 24 May. It dealt mainly with financial participation and equality in taxation, trade and building issues with the merchant class. In the days that followed, these demands were reduced in negotiations between the council and the board to 16 points, which were likely also taken up with the Elector afterwards. On 5 August, however, Archbishop Richard ordered the council to overturn all concessions to the townsmen. Furthermore, a ban on assembly was decreed, and the ineligible townsmen were stripped of their right to send two representatives to council.

In 1806, Limburg came into the possession of the newly founded Duchy of Nassau. In 1818 the town wall was torn down. In 1827 the town was raised to a Catholic episcopal seat. In 1866 the Duchy and with it Limburg passed to Prussia in the wake of the Austro-Prussian War. As of 1862, Limburg became a railway hub and from 1886 a district seat. In 1892, the Pallottines settled in town, but only the men; the women came in 1895.

During World War I there was a major prisoner of war camp at Limburg an der Lahn. Many Irish members of the British Army were interned there until the end of the war and at one stage they were visited by the Irish republican leader Roger Casement in an attempt to win recruits for the forthcoming Irish rebellion.

From 1919 to 1923, Limburg was the "capital" of a short-lived state called Free State Bottleneck (or Freistaat Flaschenhals in German) because during the Allied occupation of the Rhineland it was effectively cut off from the Weimar Republic in an area the shape of a bottle's neck and subsequently separated from its administration.

In August 1939, shortly before the German invasion of Poland and start of World War II, the German Army established the Dulag G prisoner-of-war camp for Polish POWs in the town. The camp was dissolved in January 1941.

== Politics ==
=== Town council ===
The municipal election held on 6 March 2016 yielded the following results:

Parties and voter communities		% 2016	seats 2016	% 2011	seats 2011
CDU	Christian Democratic Union of Germany	42.8	19	42.2	19
SPD	Social Democratic Party of Germany	33.0	15	27.5	13
GRÜNE	Bündnis 90/Die Grünen	15.5	7	9.0	4
FWG	Freie Wähler Gemeinschaft Limburg	-	-	5.2	2
FDP	Free Democratic Party	10.2	5	4.7	2
BZL	Bürgervereinigung Zukunft Limburg	-	-	4.1	2
LINKE	Die Linke	4.7	2	0.8	0
Total		100.0	45	100.0	45
voter turnout in %		45.5		43.5	

=== Mayor ===
The town's mayor is currently Marius Hahn (SPD).

=== Sponsorship ===
In 1956, a sponsorship was undertaken for Sudeten Germans driven out of the town of Uničov, Czech Republic.

== Economy and infrastructure ==
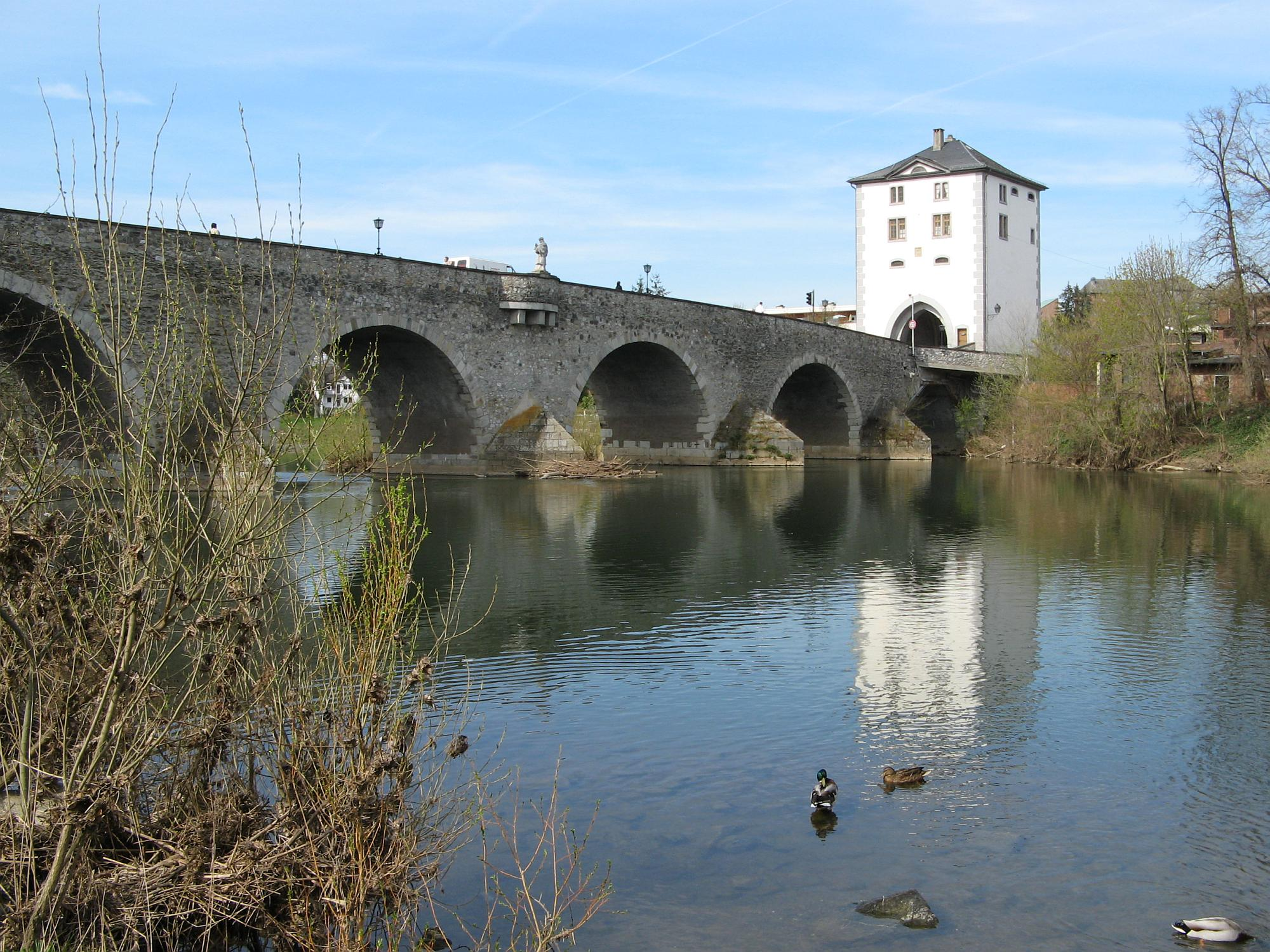
The old Lahn Bridge was where the Via Publica crossed the Lahn

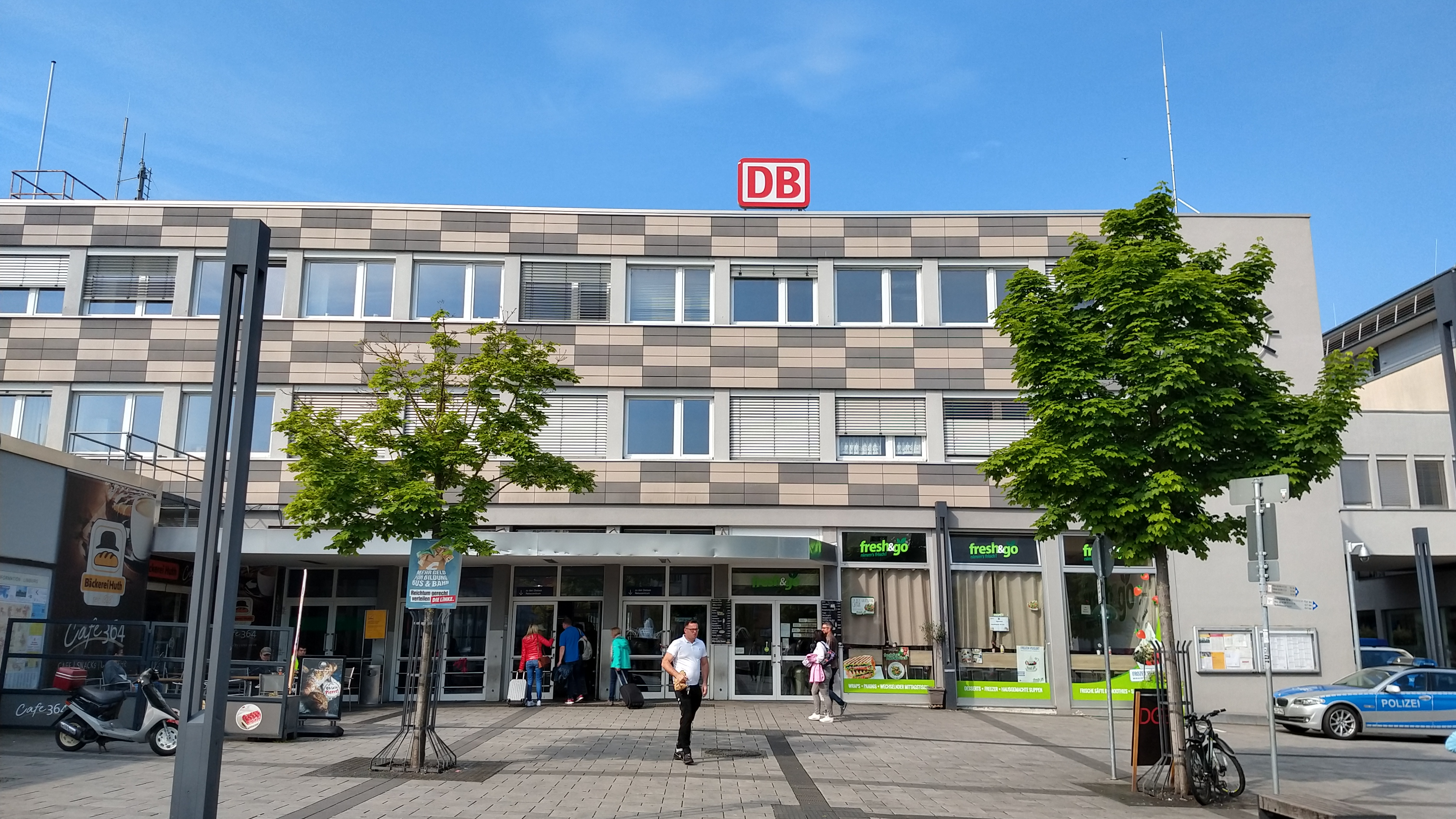
Limburg (Lahn) train station

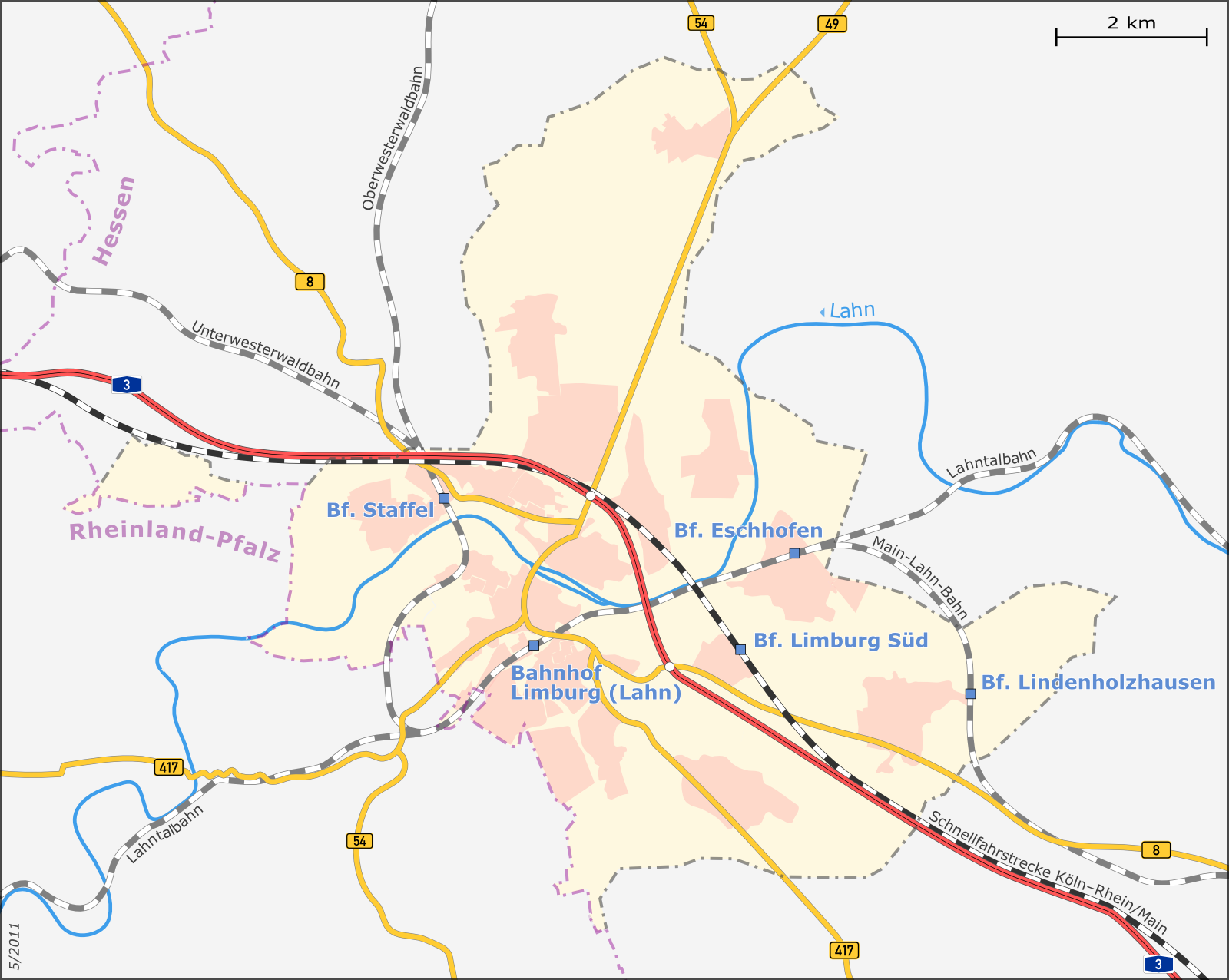
Railway and main road map

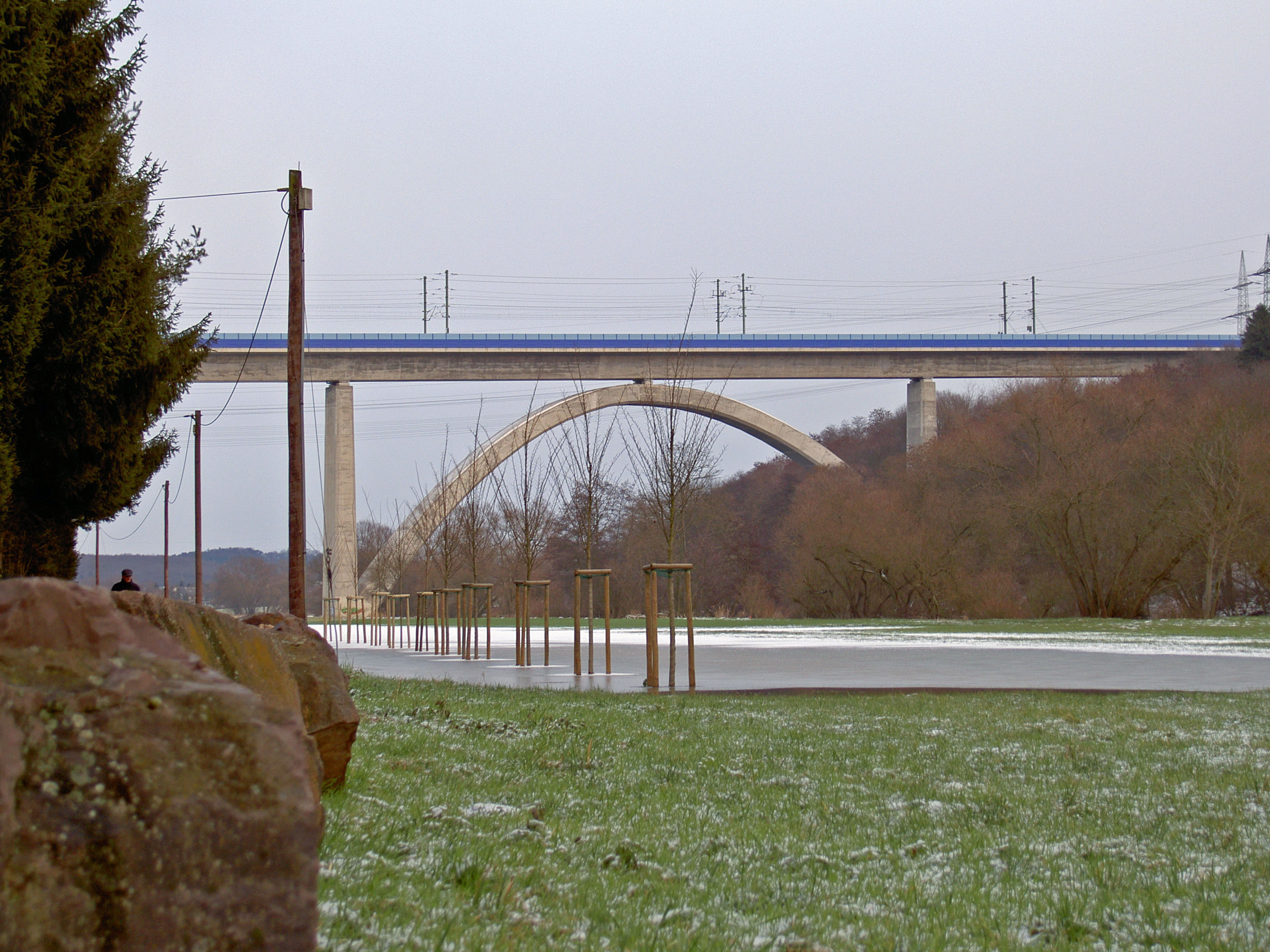
Lahn Valley Bridge on the InterCityExpress high-speed rail line

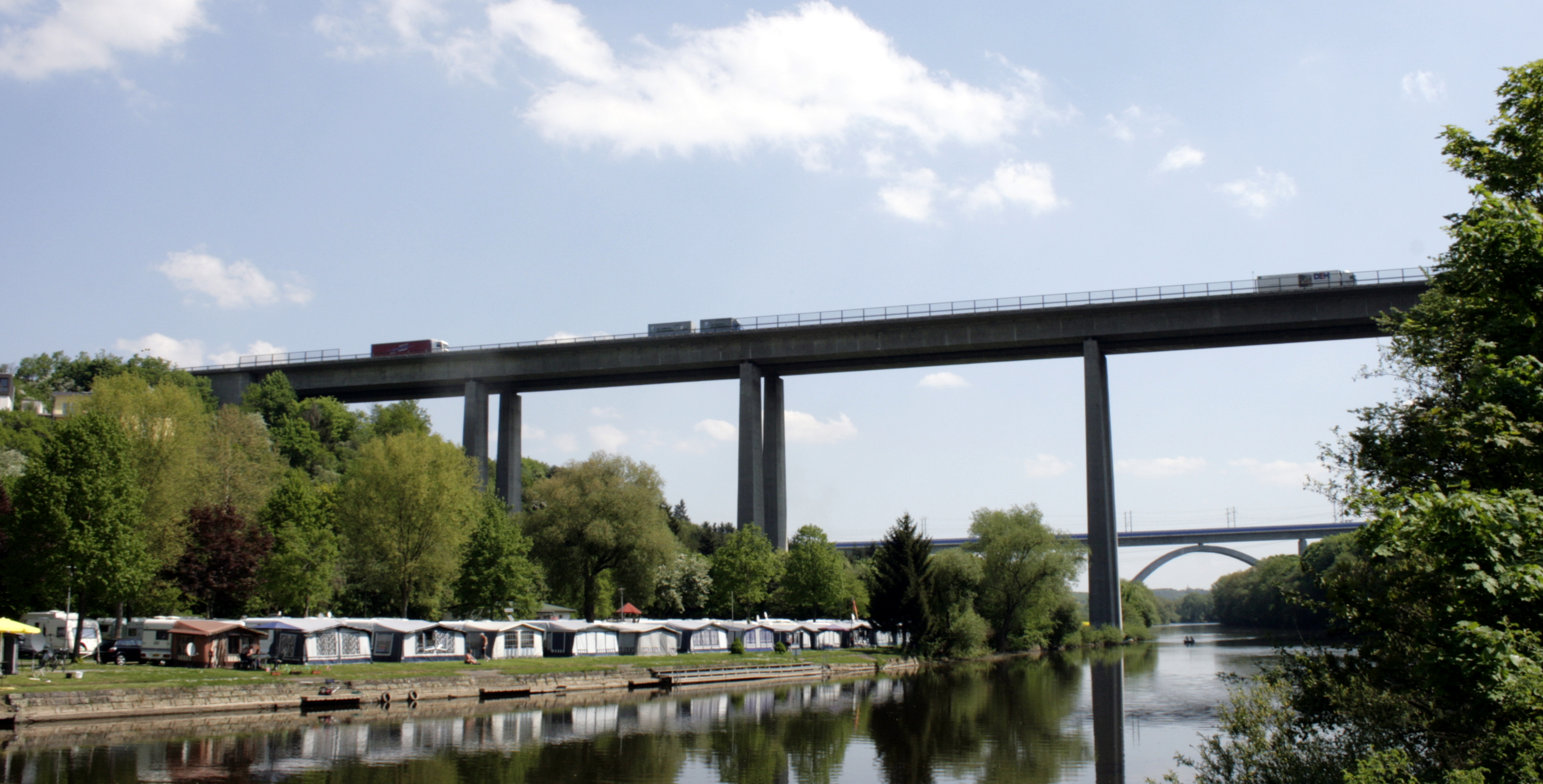
Lahn Valley Bridge on the A3, in the background the ICE bridge, in the foreground at left part of the campground

=== Transport ===
Limburg is a traditional transportation hub. Already in the Middle Ages, the Via Publica crossed the navigable Lahn here. Today the A 3 (Emmerich–Oberhausen–Cologne–Frankfurt–Nuremberg–Passau) and Bundesstraße 8, which both follow the Via Publica's alignment as closely as possible, run through the town. Bundesstraße 49 links Limburg to Koblenz towards the west and Wetzlar and Gießen towards the east. The section between Limburg and Wetzlar is currently being widened to four lanes. This section as far as Obertiefenbach is also known as Die lange Meil ("The Long Mile"). Bundesstraße 54 links Limburg on the one hand with Siegen to the north and on the other by way of Diez with Wiesbaden, which may likewise be reached over Bundesstraße 417 (Hühnerstraße).

As early as 1248, a wooden bridge spanned the Lahn, but was replaced after the flooding in 1306 by a stone bridge, the Alte Lahnbrücke. Other road bridges are the Lahntalbrücke Limburg (1964) on the A 3, the Lahnbrücke near Staffel and the Neue Lahnbrücke from 1968, over which run the Bundesstraßen before they cross under the inner town through the Schiedetunnel, a bypass tunnel.

Once the Lahntalbahn had been built, Limburg was joined to the railway network in 1862. Limburg railway station developed into a transport hub. Eschhofen station is also in Limburg. Other railway lines are the Unterwesterwaldbahn, RB29 (Limburg.- Diez Ost - Montabaur - Siershahn), the Westerwald-Sieg-Bahn, RB90 (Limburg - Diez Ost - Westerburg - Hachenburg - Altenkirchen (Westerwald) - Au (Sieg) - Wissen - Siegen Hbf), both RB29 and RB90 are operated by Hessische Landesbahn (HLB), section DreiLänderBahn and the Main-Lahn Railway. At Niedernhausen station on the Main-Lahn Railway, transfer to the Ländchesbahn to Wiesbaden is possible. With the exception of the upper section of the Lahntalbahn and express lines to Koblenz and Frankfurt, which are still served by Deutsche Bahn.

Limburg (Lahn) station, Eschhofen station and Lindenholzhausen stop have Bike and ride facilities and Park and ride parking lots, Limburg (Lahn) station also a Park and ride lot especially for motorbikes.

The city of Limburg is located in the area of the transport association Rhein-Main-Verkehrsverbund (RMV), zone number 6001 as well as the zone number 177 of the transport association Verkehrsverbund Rhein-Mosel (VRM).

Once the InterCityExpress Cologne-Frankfurt high-speed rail line had been built, Limburg acquired an ICE station. It is the only railway station in Germany at which exclusively ICE trains stop. The high-speed rail line crosses the Lahn over the Lahntalbrücke and then dives into the Limburger Tunnel.

The nearest airport is Frankfurt Airport, 63 km away on the A 3. Travel time there on the ICE is roughly 20 minutes. Cologne Bonn Airport is 110 km away and can be reached on the ICE in 44 minutes.

The Lahn between Lahnstein and Wetzlar is a Bundeswasserstraße ("Federal waterway"). Since the Lahntalbahn's expansion, however, the waterway's importance has been declining. It is used mainly by tourists with small motorboats, canoes and rowboats. Limburg is the landing site of the tourboat Wappen von Limburg.

=== Established businesses ===
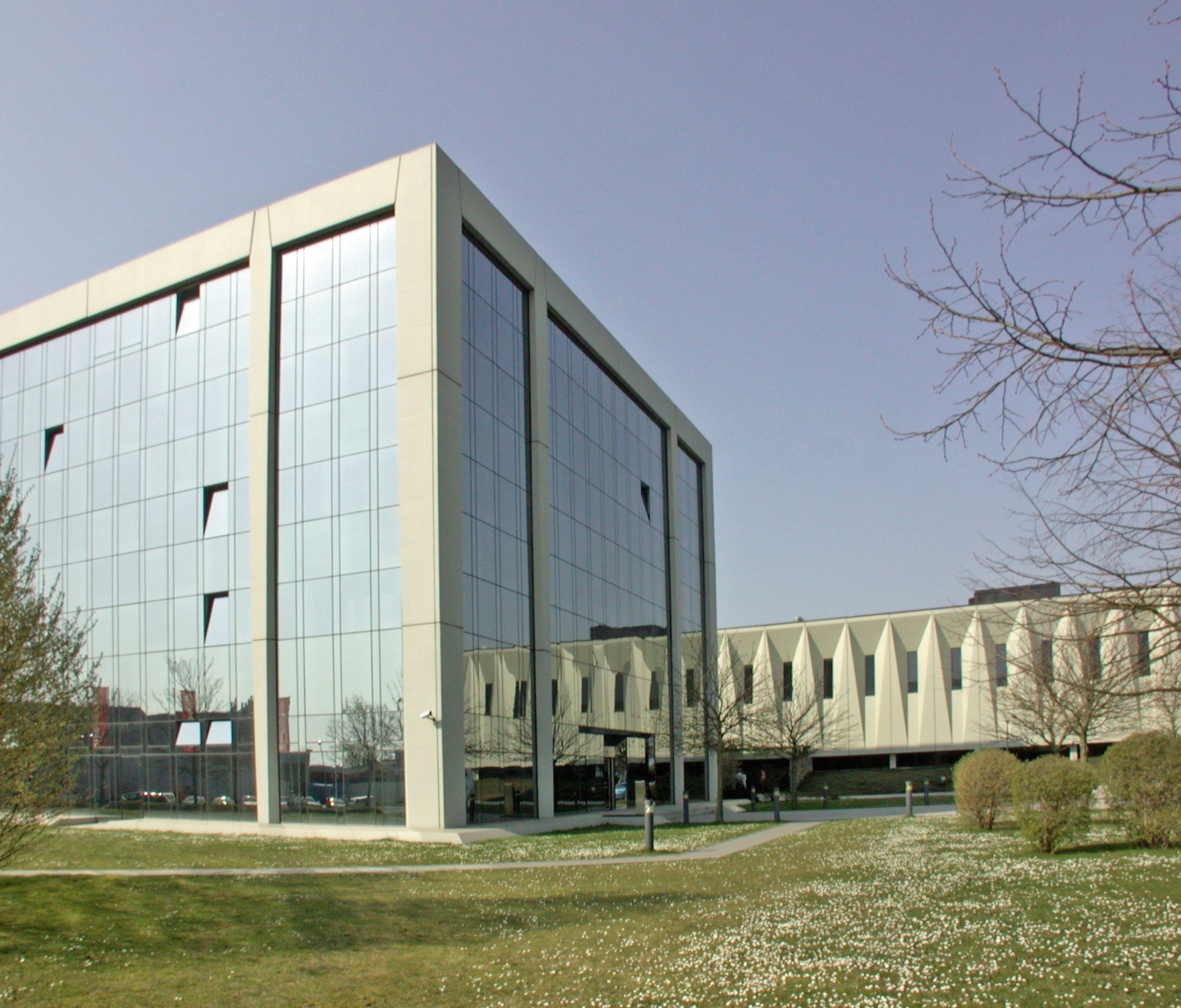
Mundipharma headquarters in the Dietkircher Höhe commercial park

- Blechwarenfabrik Limburg GmbH (Metal and plastic packaging)
- Bundesanzeiger Verlag (publishing house)
- Harmonic Drive AG
- MOBA Mobile Automation AG
- Mundipharma
- Tetra Pak
- Vectus Verkehrsgesellschaft mbH (transport)
- Nassauische Neue Presse (newspaper)

=== Energy ===
The EVL (Energieversorgung Limburg GmbH) is the local electricity supplier.

In the district Lindenholzhausen, the first Wind turbine of the Limburg-Weilburg district has been constructed in 1995, althohgh nowadays it is no longer in service due to use down.

A wind farm of two wind turbines, that should be extendet to four, is located in the district Offheim of Limburg.

At the river, electricity also is being produced thorough a small Hydropower generator.

== Public institutions ==
=== Education ===
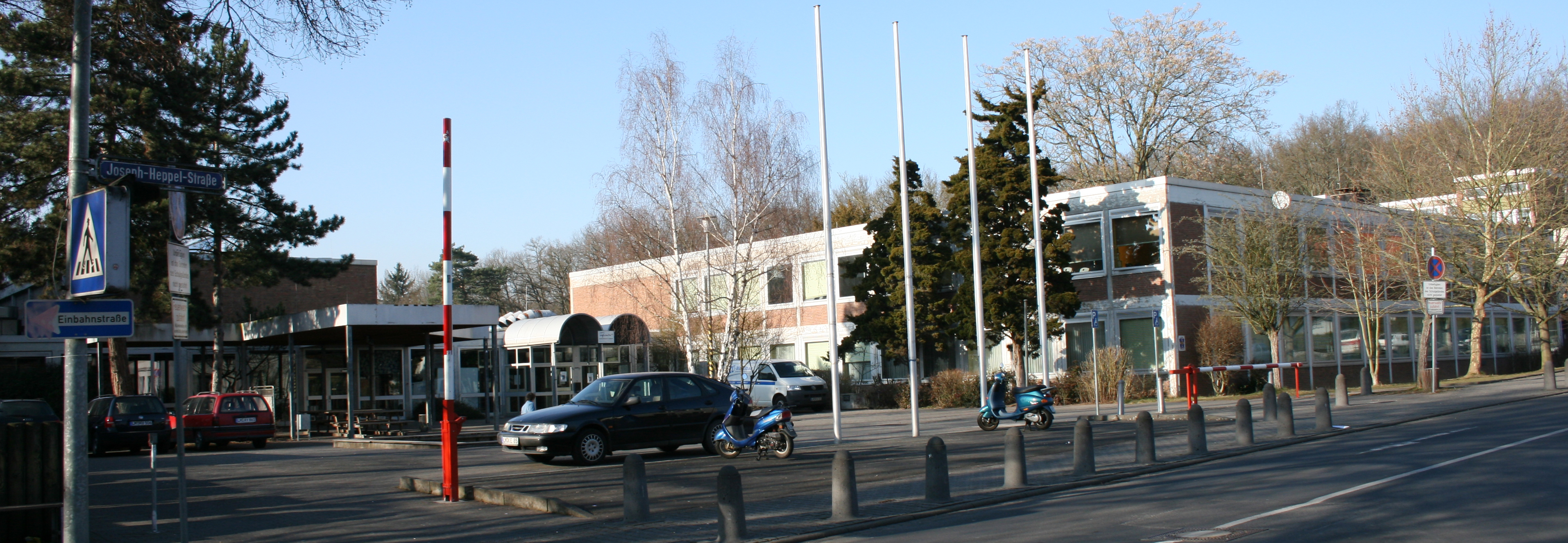
Tilemannschule

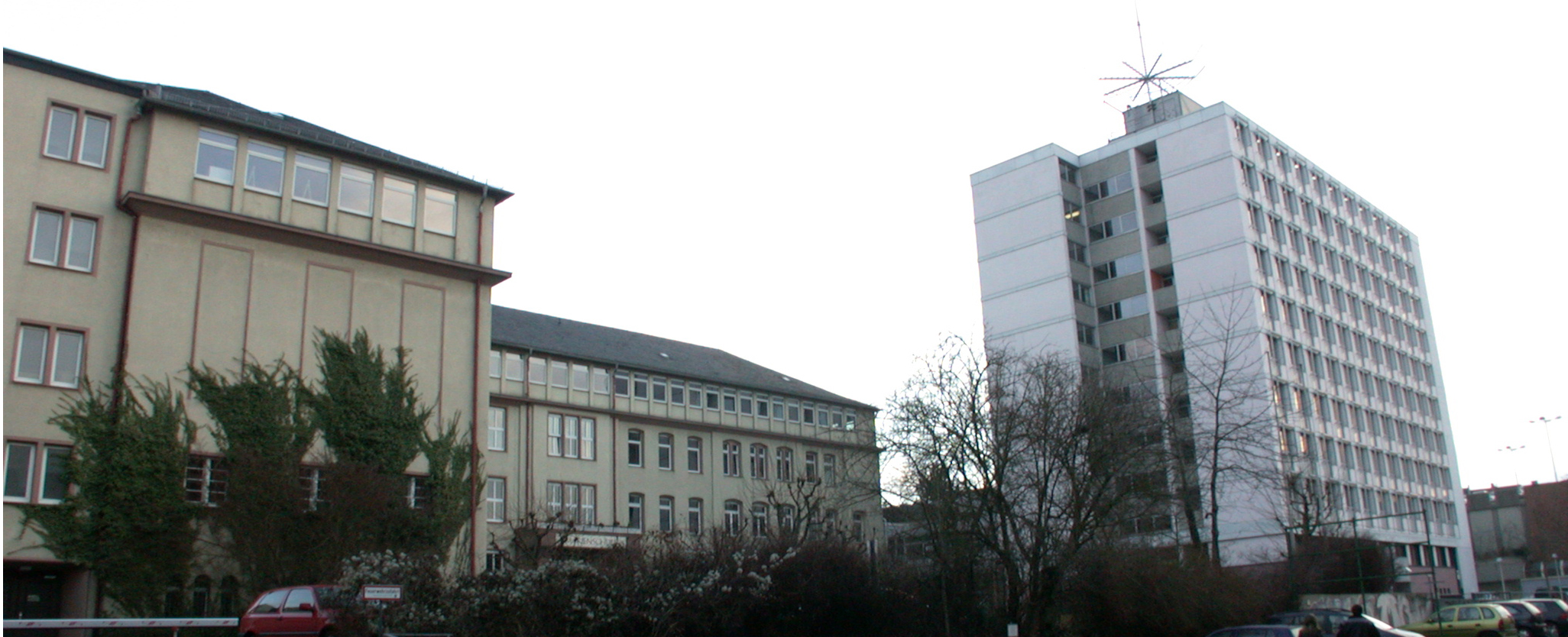
Marienschule with the old building on the left and the former boarding school hall of residence on the right

Limburg has four schools which lead to, among other qualifications, the Abitur:

- Tilemannschule, which has existed since the late 19th century and was named after the famous Limburg chancellory head Tilemann Elhen von Wolfhagen in the 1950s
- Marienschule, a private Gymnasium (Grammar School), which has existed since 1895 and which belongs to the Bishopric of Limburg.
- Peter-Paul-Cahensly-Schule with vocational Gymnasium (Grammar School) in the fields of economics and administration, data processing, electrical engineering and machine building
- Adolf-Reichwein-Schule with vocational Gymnasium in the fields of dietetics and health sciences

Professional training schools:

- Peter-Paul-Cahensly-Schule
- Friedrich-Dessauer-Schule
- Adolf-Reichwein-Schule
- Marienschule

Hauptschulen and Realschulen:

- Johann-Wolfgang-von-Goethe-Schule
- Leo-Sternberg-Schule
- Theodor-Heuss-Schule

Libraries:

- Dombibliothek
- Diözesanbibliothek

=== St. Vincenz Hospital ===
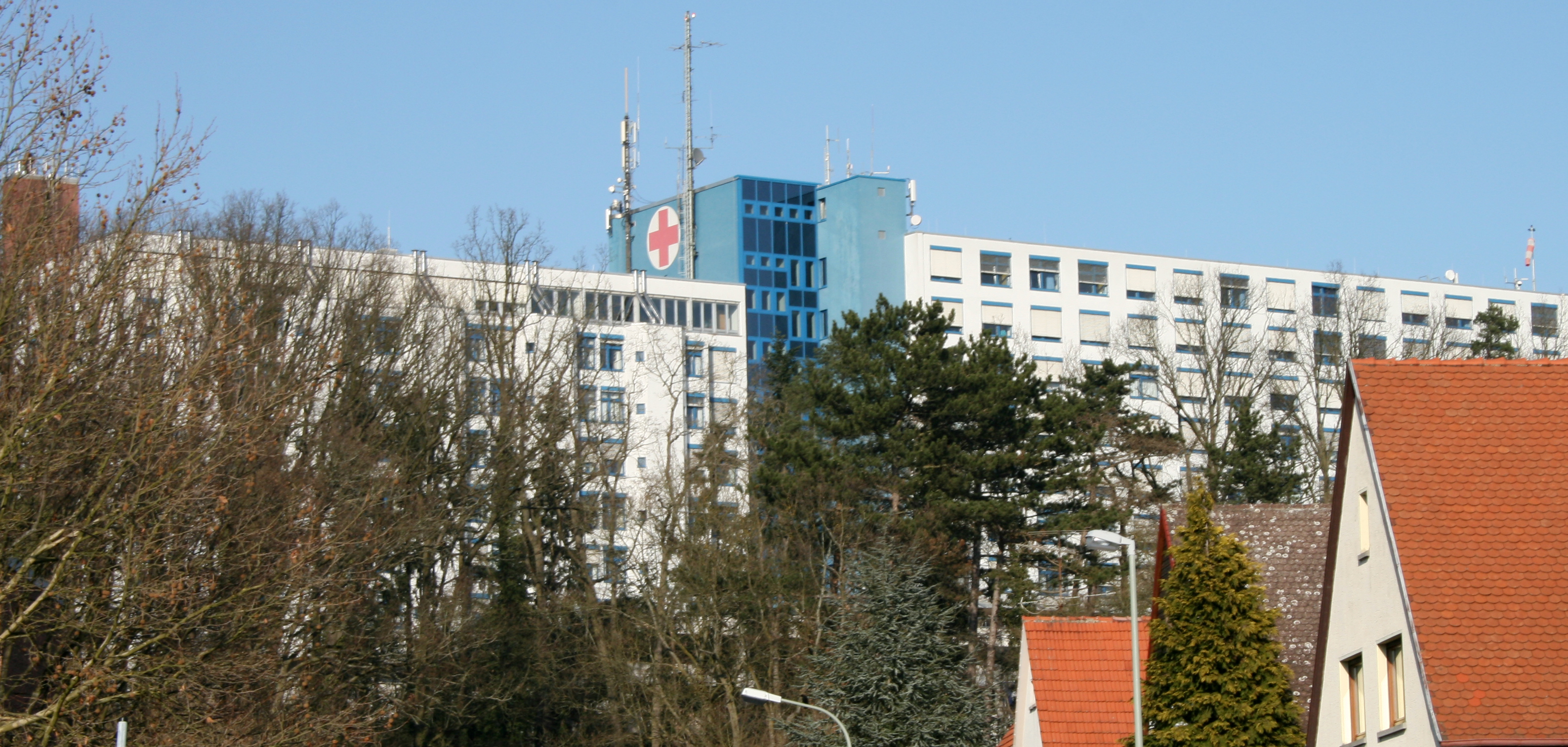
Krankenhaus St. Vincenz

The hospital perched on the Schafsberg overlooking the town has at its disposal 433 beds and 15 specialist departments.

=== Sport and leisure ===
In Limburg there are various sport clubs; some are even represented in Bundesligen, and even at the world level.

- Limburger Club für Wassersport 1895/1907 e.V. (training base for the Deutscher Ruderverband)
- Limburger Hockey Club
- Schwimmverein Poseidon Limburg e. V. (swimming)
- various clubs in the outlying centres such as the Turnverein Eschhofen (gymnastics club), the fistball stronghold in Limburg-Weilburg

=== Youth meeting place in Limburg ===
The Evangelical Church offers with its Jugendfreizeitstätte Limburg (JFS for short, meaning "Youth Leisure Place") a meeting place for youth with many events. With table football, Internet café and many events, this institution is not only church-based, with two staff and a Zivildienstleistender supporting the visitors not only with their problems.

=== Limburg Mothers' Centre ===
The Mütterzentrum Limburg is a family meeting place for those with or without children on Hospitalstraße. The club is supported by the town of Limburg and the Bundesland of Hesse and offers among other things a parents' service that looks after children, a broad array of course offerings for children and adults, a miniature kindergarten and a café.

=== Volunteer fire brigades ===
- Limburg an der Lahn Volunteer Fire brigade, founded 1867 (includes Youth Fire Brigade)
- Ahlbach Volunteer Fire Brigade, founded 1908 (includes Youth Fire Brigade)
- Dietkirchen Volunteer Fire Brigade, founded 1934 (includes Youth Fire Brigade)
- Eschhofen Volunteer Fire Brigade, founded 1901 (includes Youth Fire Brigade)
- Lindenholzhausen Volunteer Fire Brigade, founded 1933 (includes Youth Fire Brigade)
- Linter Volunteer Fire Brigade, founded 1935 (includes Youth Fire Brigade)
- Offheim Volunteer Fire Brigade, founded 1898 (includes Youth Fire Brigade)
- Staffel Volunteer Fire Brigade, founded 1880 (includes Youth Fire Brigade)

== Culture and sightseeing ==
=== Performers ===
The cabaret troupe "Thing", founded more than 25 years ago, moved after a short time from its initial home in the outlying centre of Staffel to the Josef-Kohlmaier-Halle, a civic event hall, where its stage can now be found in the hall's club rooms. The troupe is run by an independent acting club. On the programme are chanson, cabaret, literature and jazz as well as folk, Rock and performances by singer-songwriters. It makes a point of furthering young artists. Each month, three or four events are staged.

The dedication of "Thing" was recognized on 6 December 2003 when the Kulturpreis Mittelhessen ("Middle Hesse Culture Prize") was awarded to it.

Limburg Cathedral has a boys' choir, the Limburger Domsingknaben, which trains at Musical Boarding School in Hadamar, and a girls' choir, the Mädchenkantorei Limburg, both singing at the Limburg Cathedral and internationally.

=== Museums ===
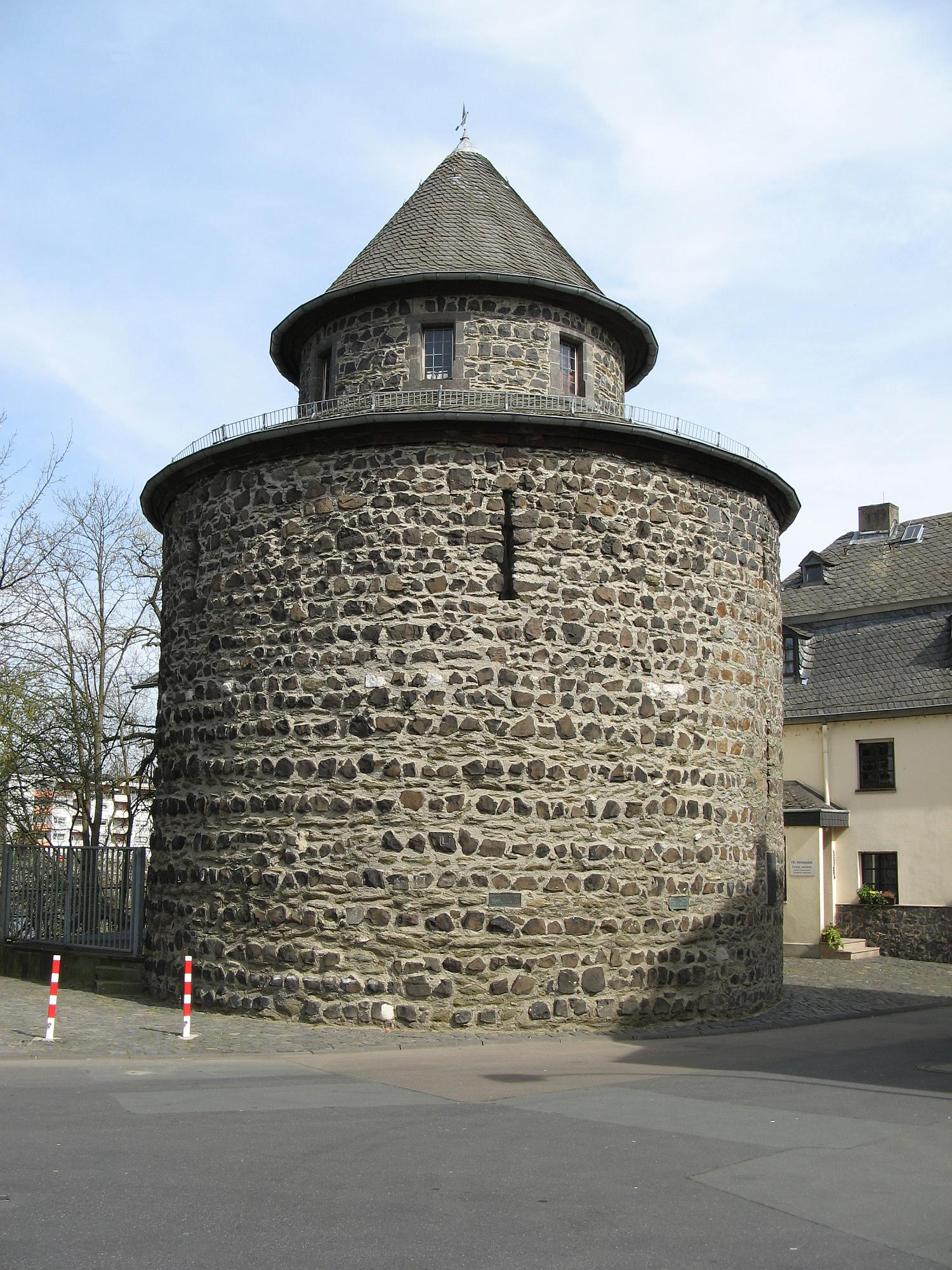
The Katzenturm, formerly part of the town wall, today a navy museum

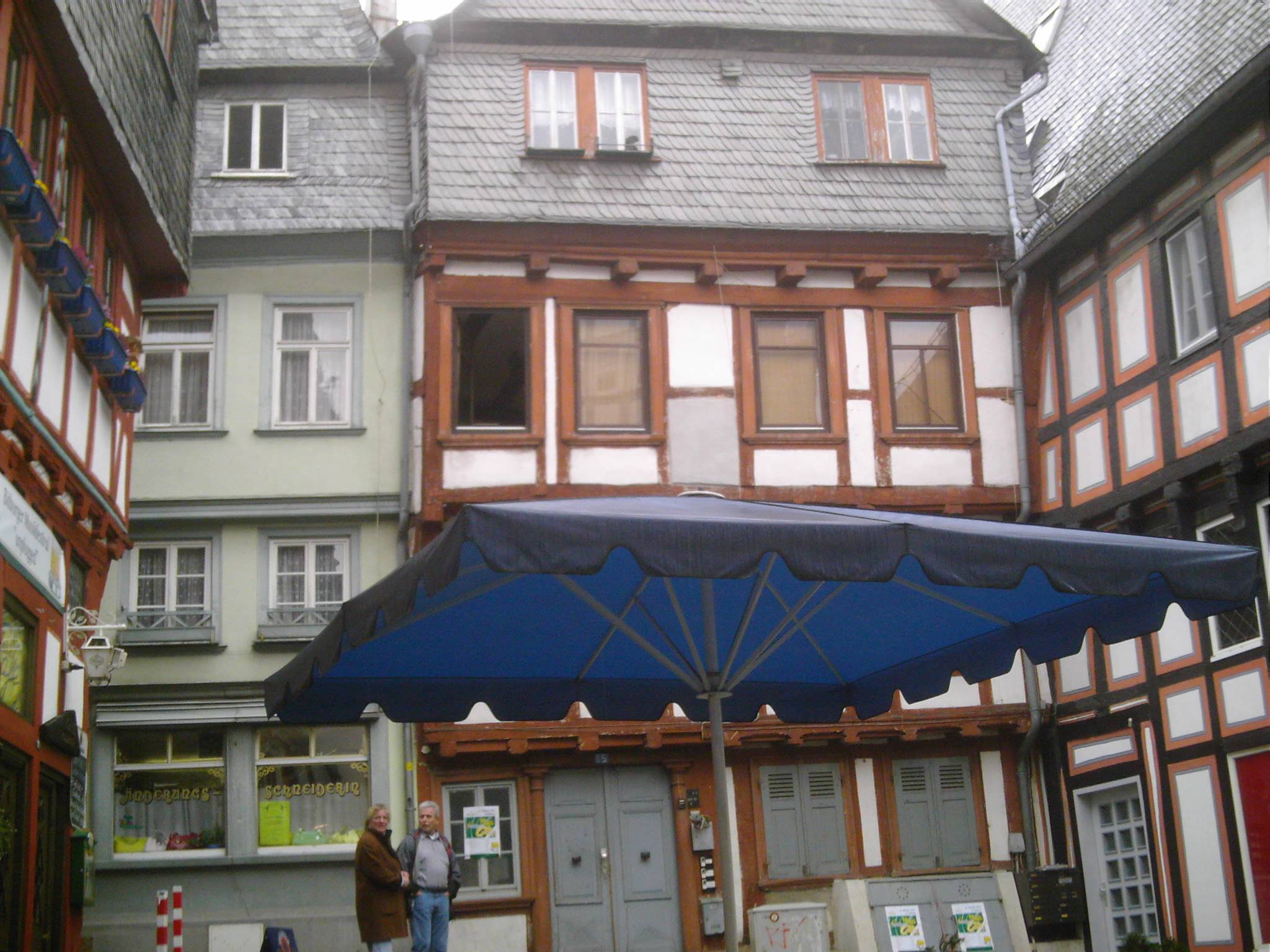
Fischmarkt

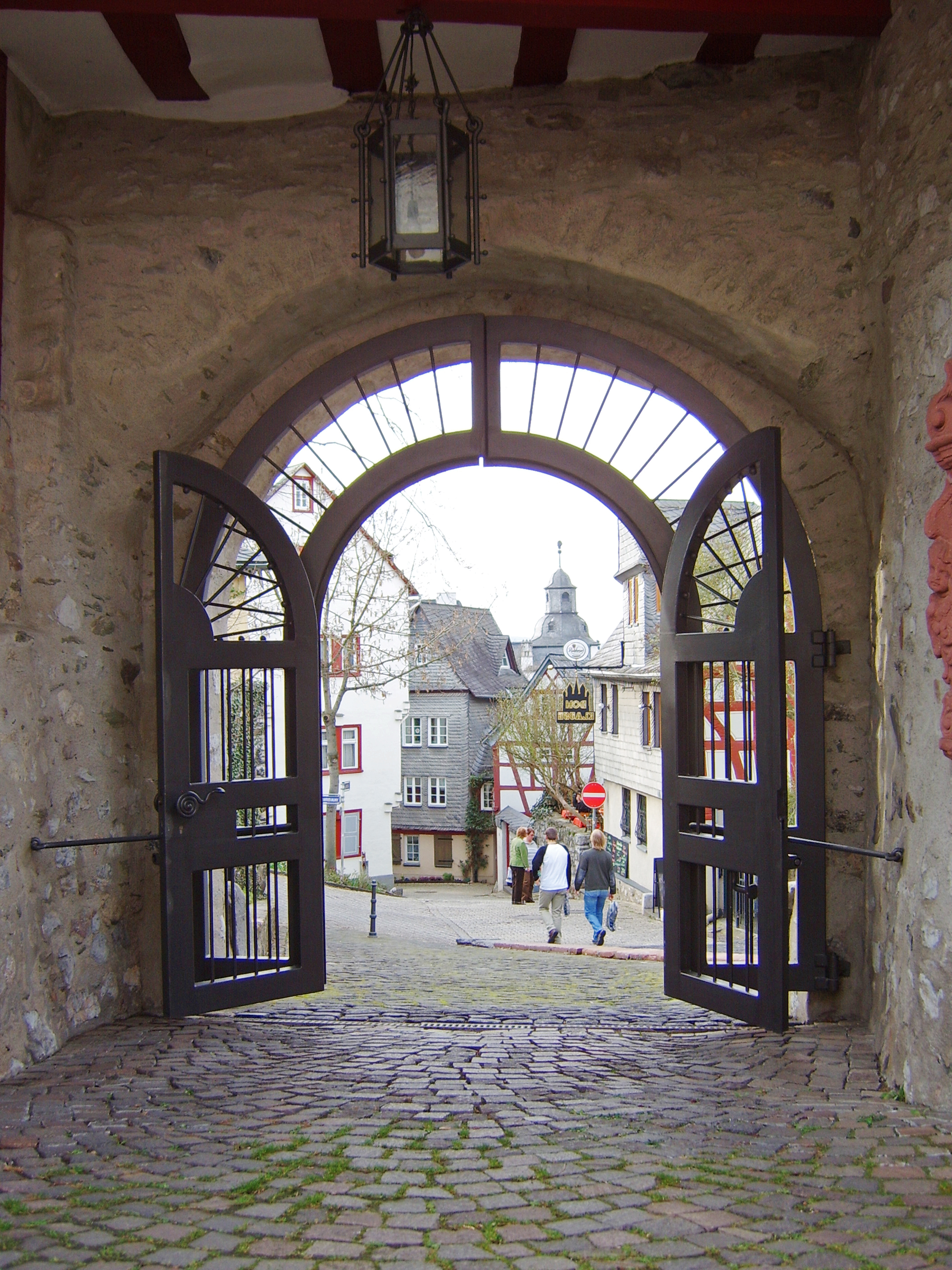
View through a gate near the Limburg cathedral treasury

In Limburg there are several museums. The most important are:

- Town of Limburg art collections that offer changing exhibits
- Staurothek, cathedral treasury and diocesan museum with the Limburger Staurothek (a cross reliquary)
- Museum Limburg Navy Museum
- Pallottine Mission museum

=== Buildings ===
Only a few towns, like Limburg, have been able to keep a full set of nearly unscathed mediaeval buildings. The formerly walled town core between St. George's Cathedral, Grabenstraße (a street marking the old town moat) and the 600-year-old Lahn Bridge thus stands today as a whole under monumental protection.

The Altstadt ("Old Town") has a fine cathedral and is full of narrow streets with timber-frame houses, dating mainly from the 17th and 18th centuries; hence the name the German Timber-Frame Road.

- Limburger Dom, one of the most complete creations of Late Romanesque architecture. It was printed on the reverse of the 1,000 Deutsche Mark note from the second series, which was in circulation from 1960 to 1989. The cathedral was recently renovated and painted to reflect its original appearance.
- Limburger Schloss, built in early 13th century by Gerlach von Ysenburg
- Burgmannenhaus, built about 1544; serves as a museum today
- St. Anna-Kirche (church), stained glass from third fourth of 14th century with eighteen scenes from the New Testament
- Old Lahn Bridge, from 1315, place where the Via Publica (road) crossed the Lahn
- In the Old Town stand many timber-frame houses from the 13th to 19th centuries. One peculiarity seen among the timber-framed houses of Limburg is the "hall house" from the High Middle Ages, which has a great hall on the ground floor. When restoration work began in the Old Town in 1972, the houses were carefully restored. Among the best known timber-frame houses are:
  - Haus Kleine Rütsche 4, narrowest spot on the historic trade road between Frankfurt and Cologne, whose breadth is written at the Haymarket (Heumarkt) in Cologne
  - Haus der sieben Laster ("House of the Seven Vices") at Brückengasse 9, built in 1567, timber-frame house with carvings showing Christianity's seven deadly sins, namely pride, greed, envy, lust, gluttony, wrath and sloth
  - Werner-Senger-Haus, a beautiful stone hall house with timber-framed façade dating from the 13th century
  - Houses at the fishmarket. The square's name in the 13th century was still Fismart ("Yarn Market" or "Wool Market") in the Limburg dialect, and it was the Limburg wool weavers' trading centre
  - Römer 2-4-6, Germany's oldest freestanding timbered house; in the garden a mikvah was found
- Rathaus ("Town Hall"), built in 1899
- "Huttig" (town wall tower remnant)
- Former noble estate of the Counts of Walderdorff at Fahrgasse 5

== Twin towns – sister cities ==
Limburg an der Lahn is twinned with:

- Lichfield, England, United Kingdom
- Oudenburg, Belgium
- Sainte-Foy-lès-Lyon, France

== Notable people ==
- Imagina of Isenburg-Limburg (c. 1255 – 1313?), the Queen consort of Adolf of Nassau, King of Germany
- Alois Anton Führer (1853–1930), indologist
- Sergey Taboritsky (1897-1980), Jewish-Russian antisemitic Nazi collaborator, died there
- Alexej Stachowitsch (1918–2013), Austrian-Russian author, pedagogue and songwriter, died there
- Franz Kamphaus (born 1932), bishop emeritus of the Roman Catholic Diocese of Limburg
- Theo Geisel (born 1948), physicist
- Eberhard Metternich (born 1959), catholic church musician
- Christoph Prégardien (born 1956), lyric tenor
- Alison Browner (born 1957), Irish mezzo-soprano opera singer, based in Limburg an der Lahn
- Franz-Peter Tebartz-van Elst (born 1959), prelate of the Catholic Church
- Germar Rudolf (born 1964), chemist and a convicted Holocaust denier
- Veronika Winter (born 1965), soprano
- Stefan Saliger (born 1967), field hockey player
- Peter W. Marx (born 1973), theatre and performance studies scholar
- Tamara Bach (born 1976), youth book author
- David Heiss, convicted murderer

== Gallery ==
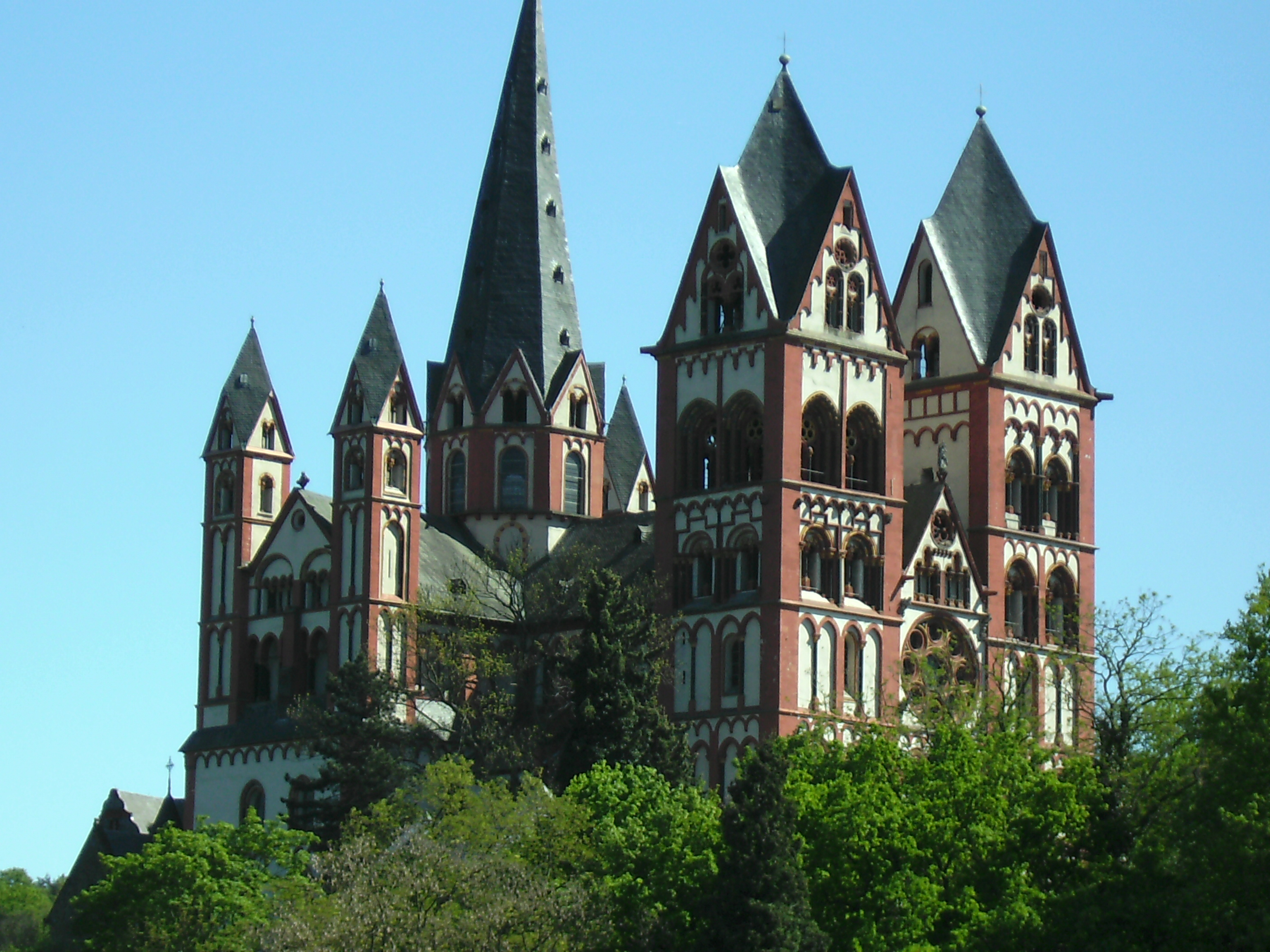
Limburg Cathedral seen from the Lahn bridge

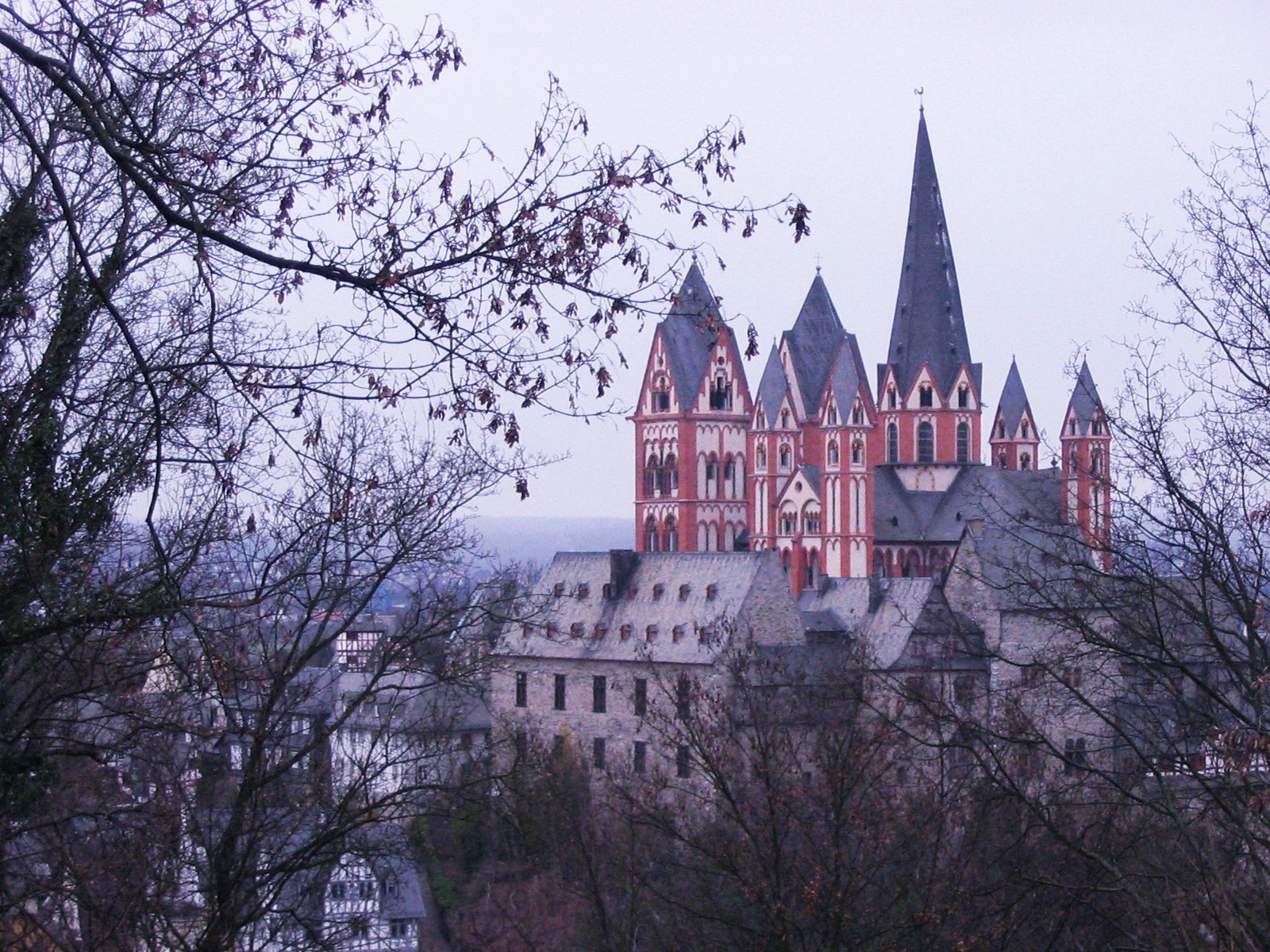
Cathedral with castle

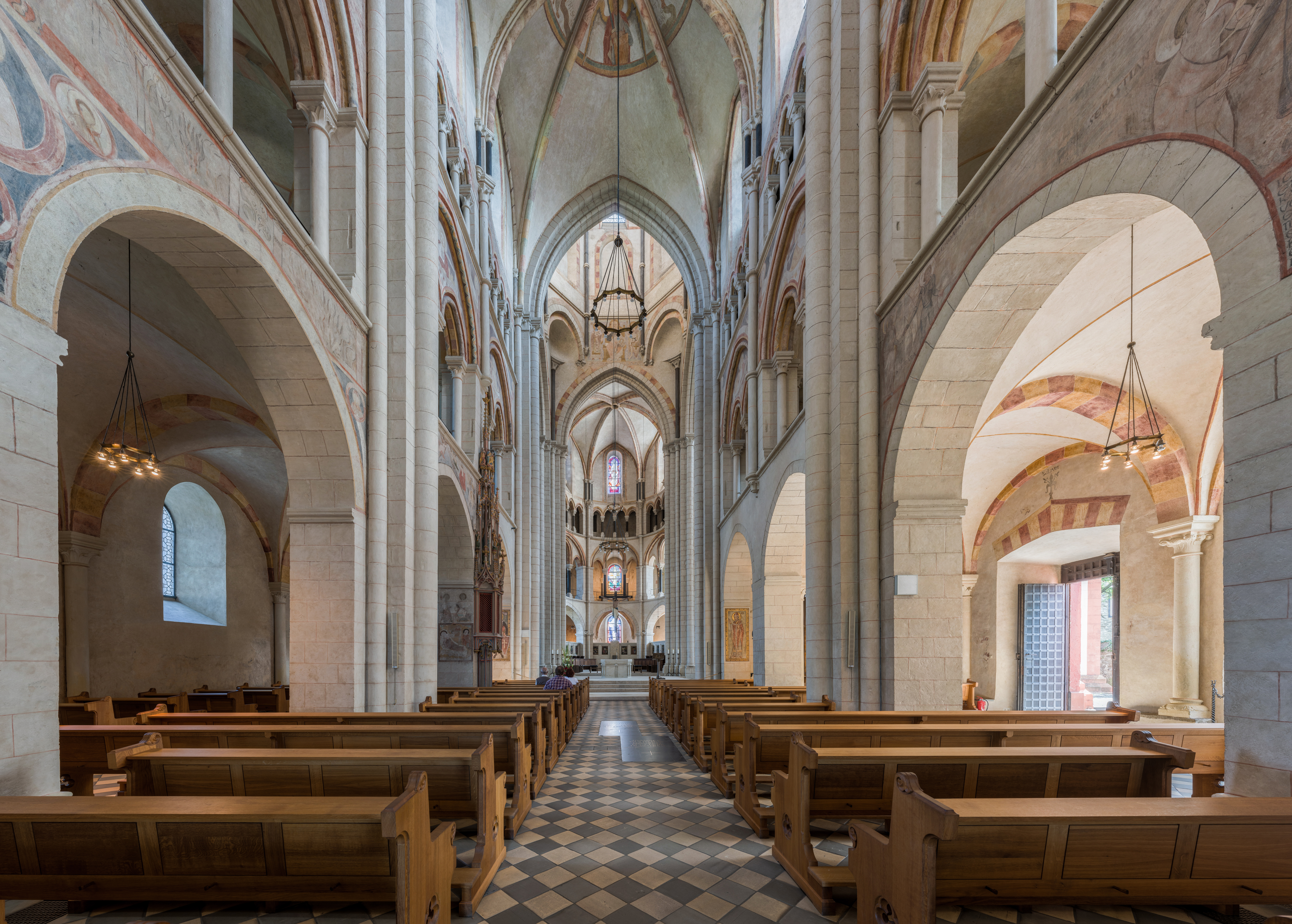
Cathedral, inside view

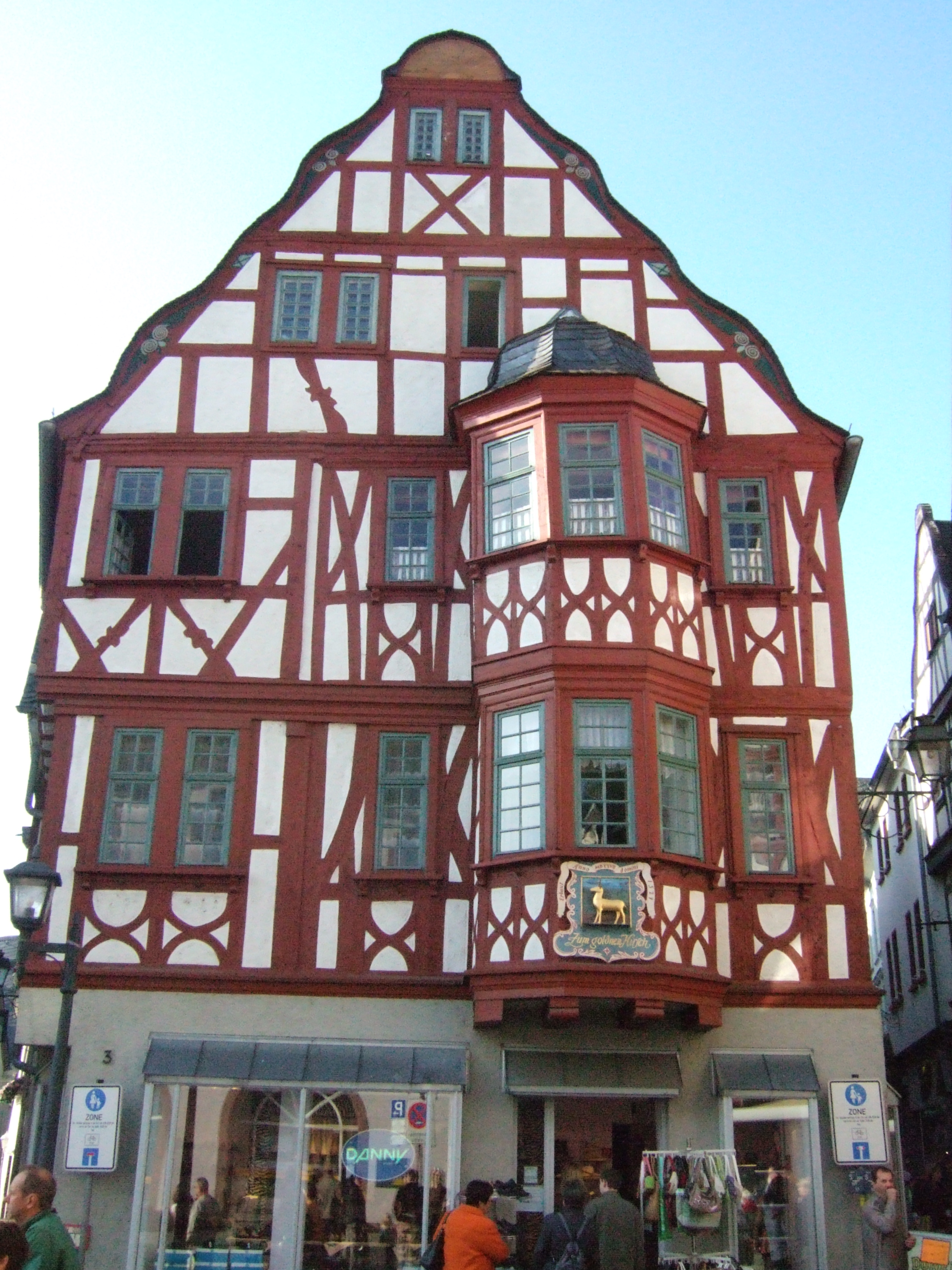
Zum goldenen Hirsch

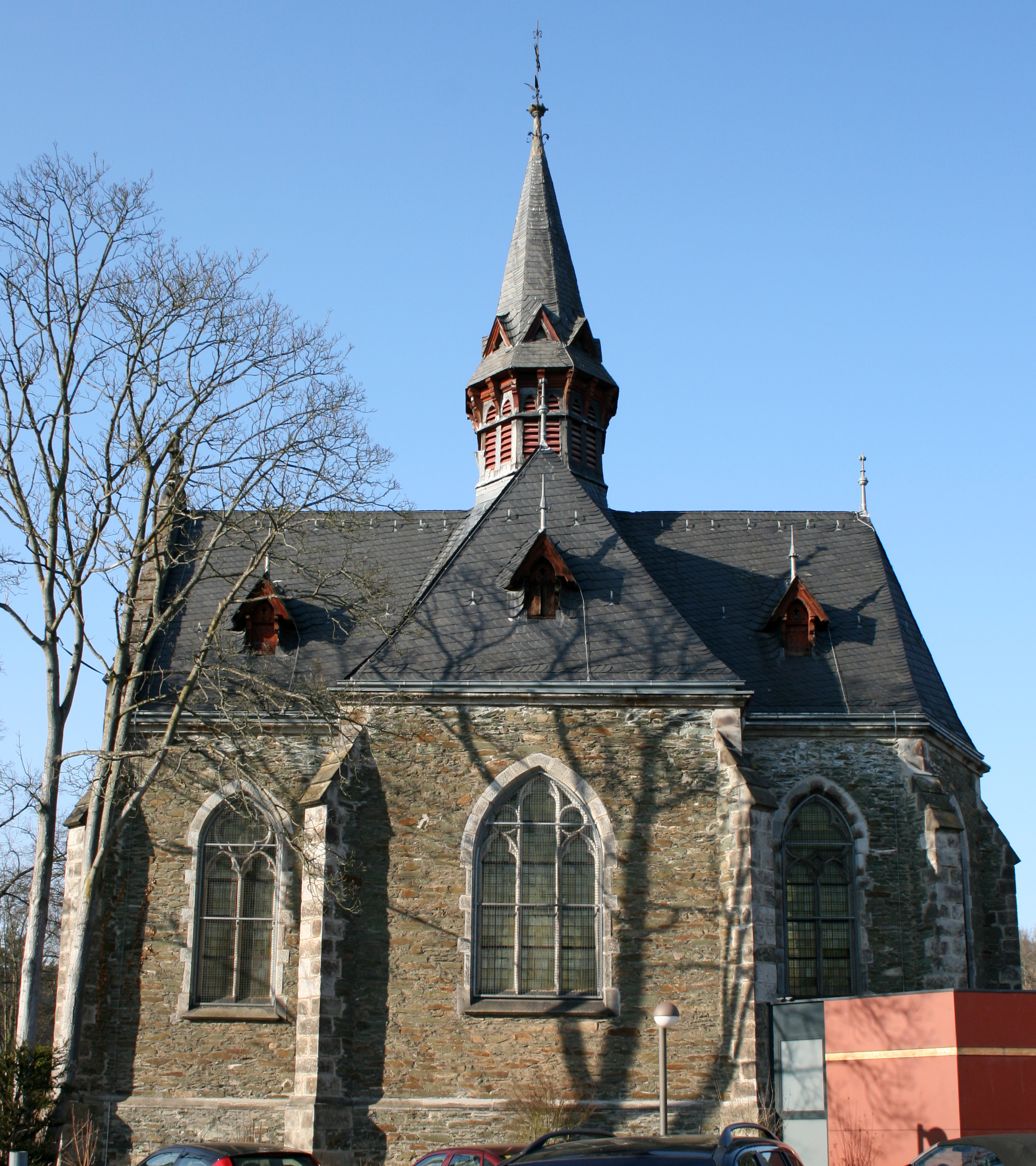
Former graveyard chapel, eaves side

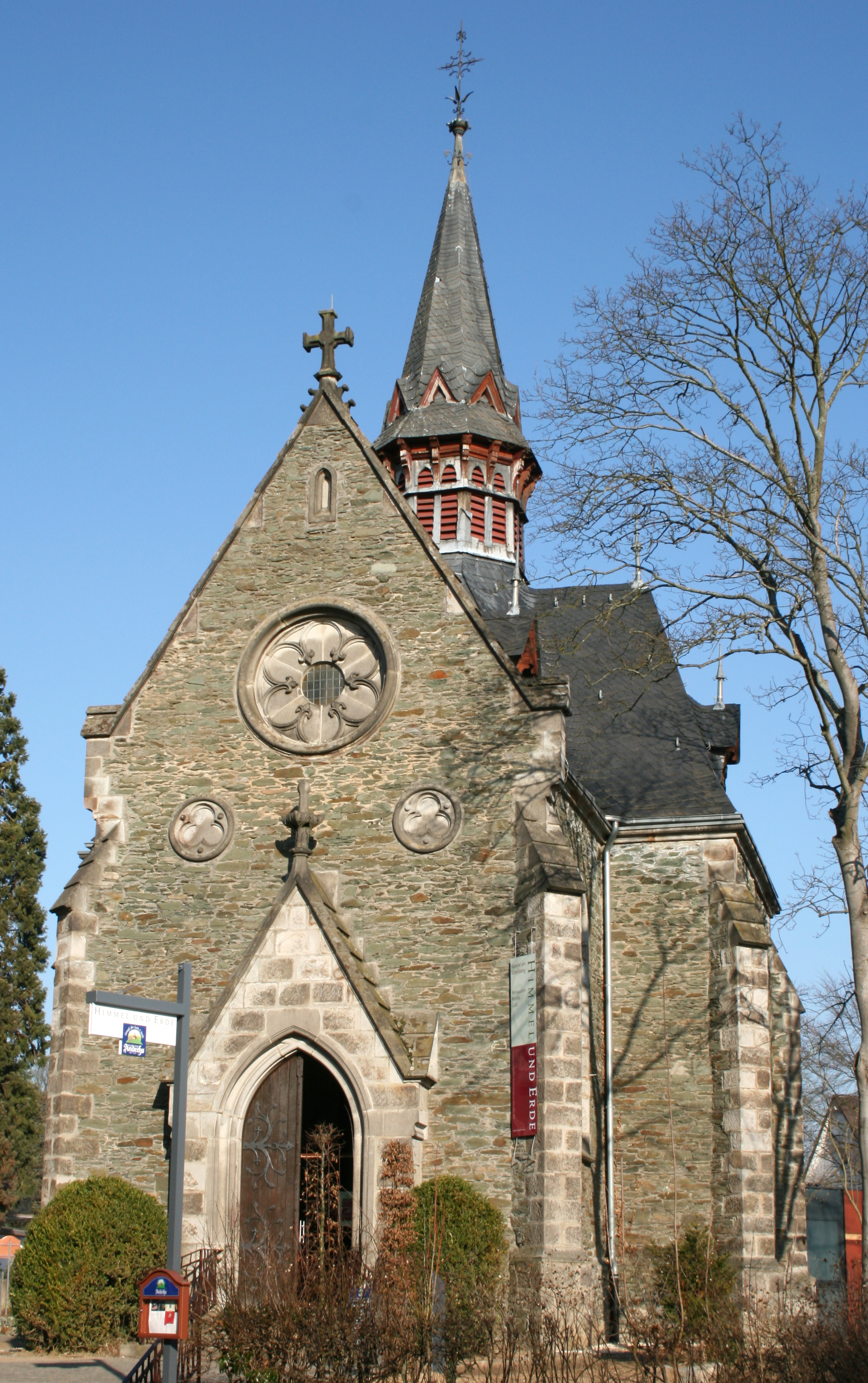
Former graveyard chapel, entrance side
