= Eberhard Metternich =

German musician

Eberhard Metternich (b. 24 July 1959 in Limburg an der Lahn) is a German catholic church musician, school musician, singer, cathedral kapellmeister and professor for choral conducting in Cologne.

Metternich sang with the Limburger Domsingknaben as a youth. After his schooling, which ended in 1979 with the Abitur at the Fürst-Johann-Ludwig-Schule in Hadamar, he studied school music, German studies and singing in Cologne and later continued his studies in choral conducting at the Hochschule für Musik und Darstellende Kunst Frankfurt am Main with Uwe Gronostay. He also studied in Vienna and with Eric Ericson in Stockholm.

In 1985 Metternich became cantor in Mainz. In 1987 he was called to Cologne as Domkapellmeister. Responsible for the conception of the Cologne Cathedral Music, he expanded the "Musikschule des Kölner Domchores" and founded the concert series "Geistliche Musik am Dreikönigsschrein" in 1991. Among other things, he conducts the Vokalensemble Kölner Dom and the Kölner Domchor. In addition, Metternich led the collegium vocale limburg until the mid-1990s.

Since 1993, Metternich has been a lecturer for choral conducting at the Hochschule für Musik Köln. In 2001 he was appointed honorary professor there.

== Awards ==
With the Cologne Cathedral Choir he won first prize at the 6th German Choir Competition (2002) in Osnabrück in the category "Knabenchöre". With the collegium vocale limburg he won the 1st prize in the category "male chamber choirs" at the 2nd German Choir Competition (1985) in Hanover.

== Publication ==
- Carl Leibl: Mass No. 3 in E flat major, published as first edition in the Denkmäler Rheinischer Musik series.
