= Limburger Domsingknaben =

German choir

- Choir
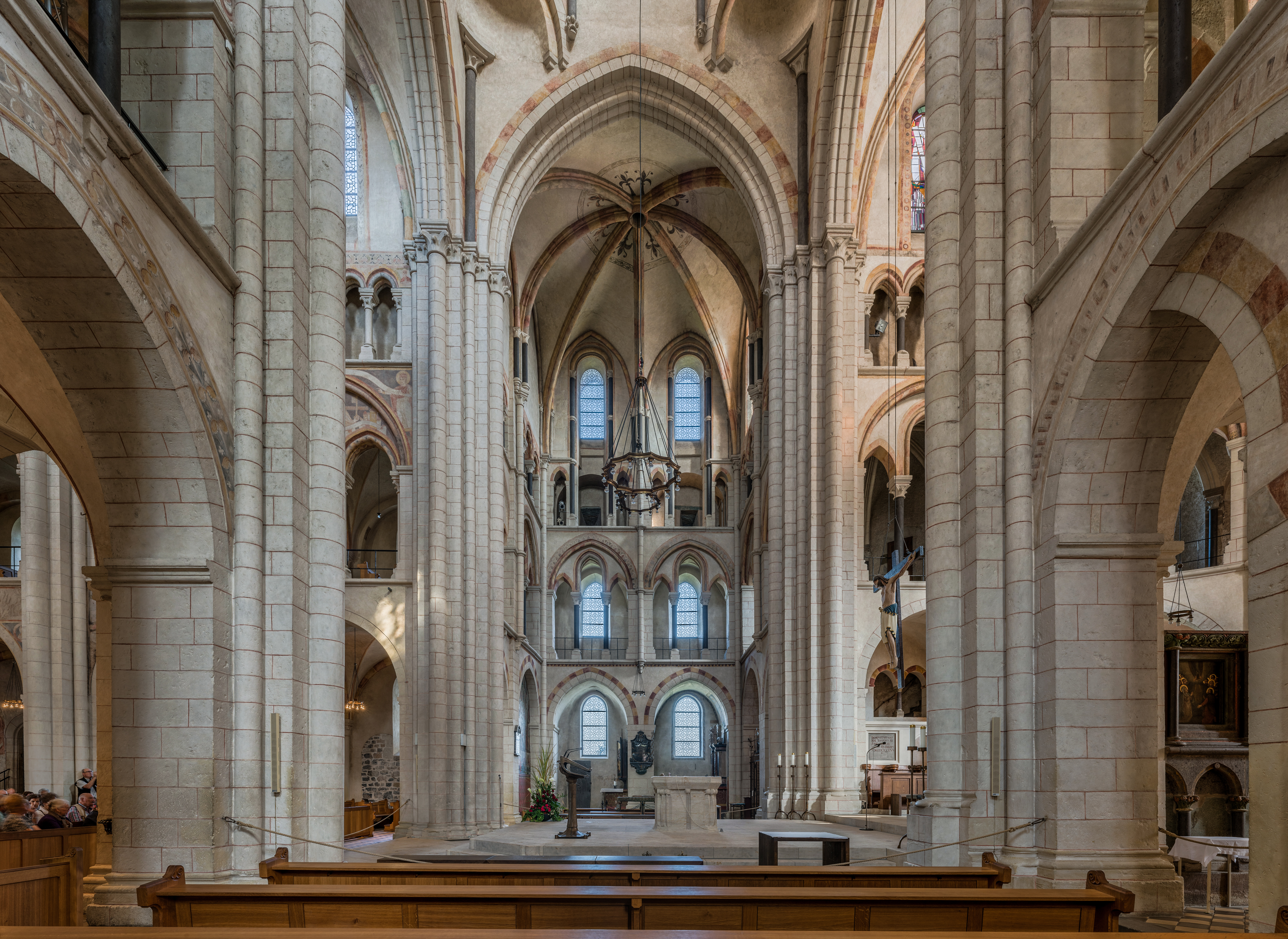
- Interior of the Limburg Cathedral
- Origin: Hadamar, Hesse, Germany
- Founded: 1967
- Genre: Boys' choir
- Chief conductor: Andreas Bollendorf
- Website: limburger-domsingknaben.de

Limburger Domsingknaben ([ˈlɪmbʊʁɡɐ ˈdoːmsɪŋknaːbm̩]; "Limburg Cathedral singing boys") is the name of the boys' choir at the Limburg Cathedral in Limburg, Hesse, Germany. The choir was founded in 1967 by the then bishop of Limburg, Wilhelm Kempf. Its conductors were Hans Bernhard, Mathias Breitschaft, Klaus Knubben and, since 2014, Andreas Bollendorf.

The choir's main task is singing in services at the Limburg Cathedral. The choir also performs in other services and performs concerts internationally. The repertoire is from all eras of classical music. They took part in recordings of Mahler symphonies, conducted by Eliahu Inbal and Paavo Järvi, and in the premiere of Kagel's Sankt-Bach-Passion.

In their home Musisches Internat, which served as a boarding school until 2007, the boys receive thorough training, four vocal rehearsals per week, individual voice coaching, and instrumental instructions. They study not only choral but also solo parts of the works they perform. Many tours took them to European and American countries. Choir members became soloists or conductors, and formed chamber choirs.

== History ==
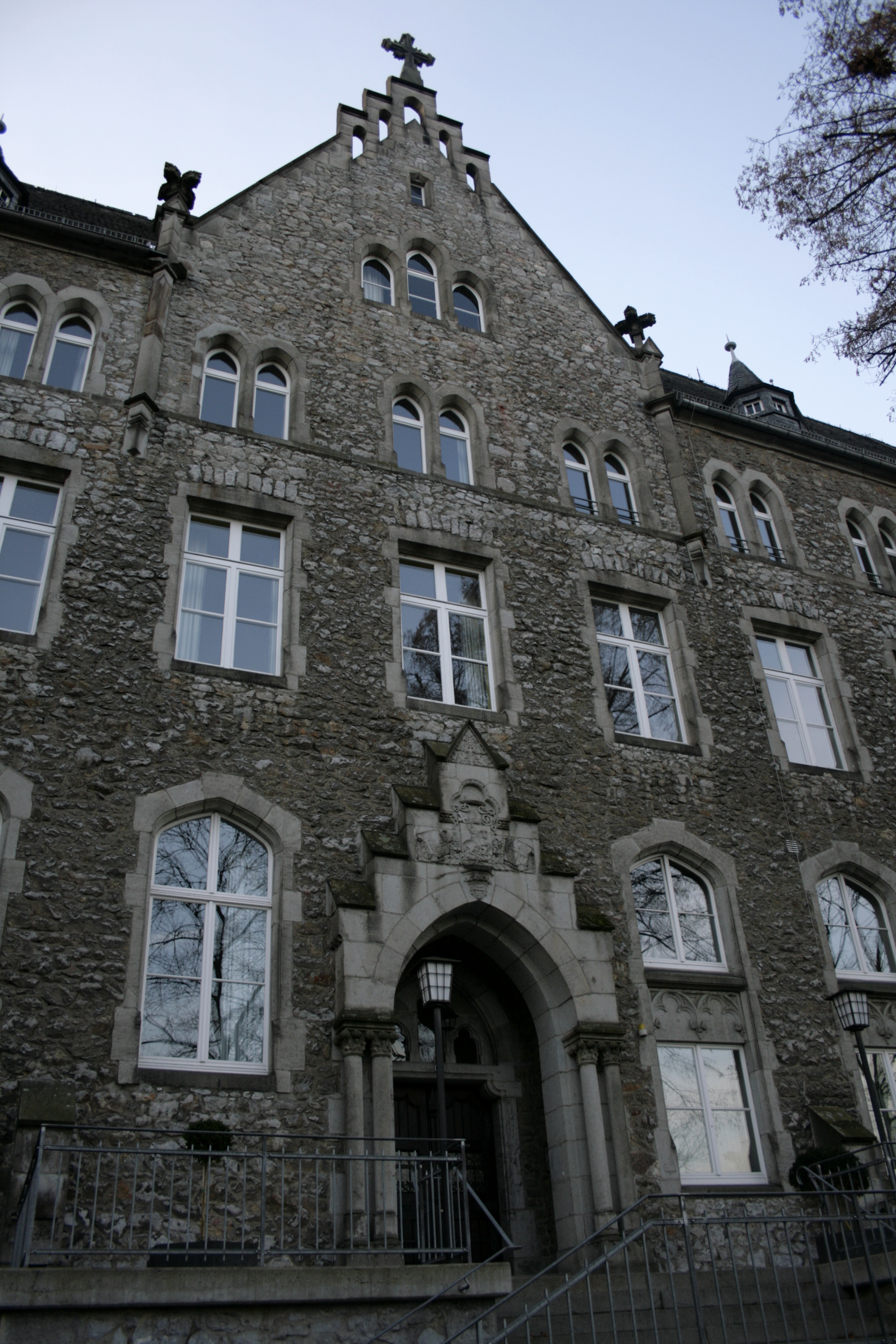
Entrance of the Musisches Internat in Hadamar

The Limburger Domsingknaben were founded in 1967 by Wilhelm Kempf, then Bishop of Limburg. Their home is the Musisches Internat, a boarding school in Hadamar, close to Limburg. The first conductor was the former Cathedral Kapellmeister Hans Bernhard. He was succeeded in 1973 by Mathias Breitschaft, who led the choir to 1985. From 1987, Domkantor Klaus Knubben was the chorale conductor, succeeded in 2014 by Andreas Bollendorf who had been a choir member as a boy. The voice coach is Wilhelm Gries.

The focus of the choir is to sing in services of the Limburg Cathedral, alternating with the Mädchenkantorei and the Limburger Domchor. The choir also performs in services in and outside of the Diocese of Limburg, and performs concerts internationally. The repertoire of the Limburger Domsingknaben spans eras from Gregorian chant via Baroque music, the Classical period, Romantic music to contemporary music. The choir performs in public yearly about 80 times, including 40 church services, secular concerts and church concerts, appearances on radio and television, and singing for special occasions.

The boys rehearse twice a week when they begin, and four times for regular members. They receive individual vocal training that makes them able to also sing solo parts. Beginning in 2007, the Musisches Internat is only used during the day, because full boarding could no longer be offered. It is used for vocal education, instrumental training (because each singer has to learn at least one instrument), and supervised homework, but also for sports and recreation.

Concert tours, beginning in 1987, took the choir to U.S. (1989, 1998 and 2007), Canada (1993 and 2001), Mexico (2000), Brazil (2011), Argentina (2011), Paraguay (2011), South Africa (1995) and other, mostly European, countries. As of 2017, the choir traveled on more than 40 tours to 26 countries.

The 50th anniversary of the choir was celebrated in 2017. They were acknowledged as ambassadors of the diocese. That year, they participated in Rome and the Vatican in the festival L'arte salva l'arte, presenting Haydn's Die Schöpfung at the Basilica of Saint Paul Outside the Walls, with the Roma Sinfonietta and soloists Mechthild Bach, Cornel Frey and Thomas Laske, conducted by Bollendorf.

Among former Limburger Domsingknaben are tenors Johannes Kalpers, Christoph Prégardien and Gerd Türk, conductors Andreas Bollendorf, Eberhard Metternich and Harald Schmitt, and the musical performer Benjamin Eberling. Around 100 conductors and the members of five chamber choirs are former members of the Limburger Domsingknaben.

== Recordings ==
The Limburger Domsingknaben recorded in 1978, conducted by Mathias Breitschaft, Christmas music including Palestrina's Ad te levavi, Reger's Mariae Wiegenlied, Hammerschmidt's Machet die Tore weit, Hermann Schroeder's "Siehe, die Jungfrau wird empfangen", Eccard's "Übers Gebirg Maria geht", Bruckner's Ave Maria, Kurt Hessenberg's "Maria durch ein Dornwald ging", Hassler's Verbum caro factum est, Bach's "Ich steh an deiner Krippen hier", Carl Loewe's "Quem pastores laudavere", "Es ist ein Ros entsprungen by Michael Praetorius, and "Drei Kön'ge wandern aus Morgenland" by Peter Cornelius, among others.

The Limburger Domsingknaben recorded several large-scale works. In 1985, they took part in a live recording of Mahler's Third Symphony at the Frankfurt Alte Oper, with soloist Doris Soffel, the women's choir of the Frankfurter Kantorei and the hr-Sinfonieorchester, conducted by Eliahu Inbal. In November 1985, they sang in the premiere of Maurizio Kagel's oratorio Sankt-Bach-Passion, conducted by the composer as part of the Berliner Festwochen at the Berlin Philharmonie. It was recorded soon afterwards, with soloists Anne Sofie von Otter, Hans Peter Blochwitz, Roland Hermann, Peter Roggisch as narrator, organist Gerd Zacher, NDR Chor and Südfunk-Chor Stuttgart, and the Radio Symphony Orchestra Stuttgart. In 2013, they participated in a live recording of Mahler's Eighth Symphony at the Frankfurt Alte Oper conducted by Paavo Järvi, with eight soloists, the EuropaChorAkademie, the Czech Philharmonic Choir Brno and the hr-Sinfonieorchester.
