= Carl Leibl =

German musician and conductor

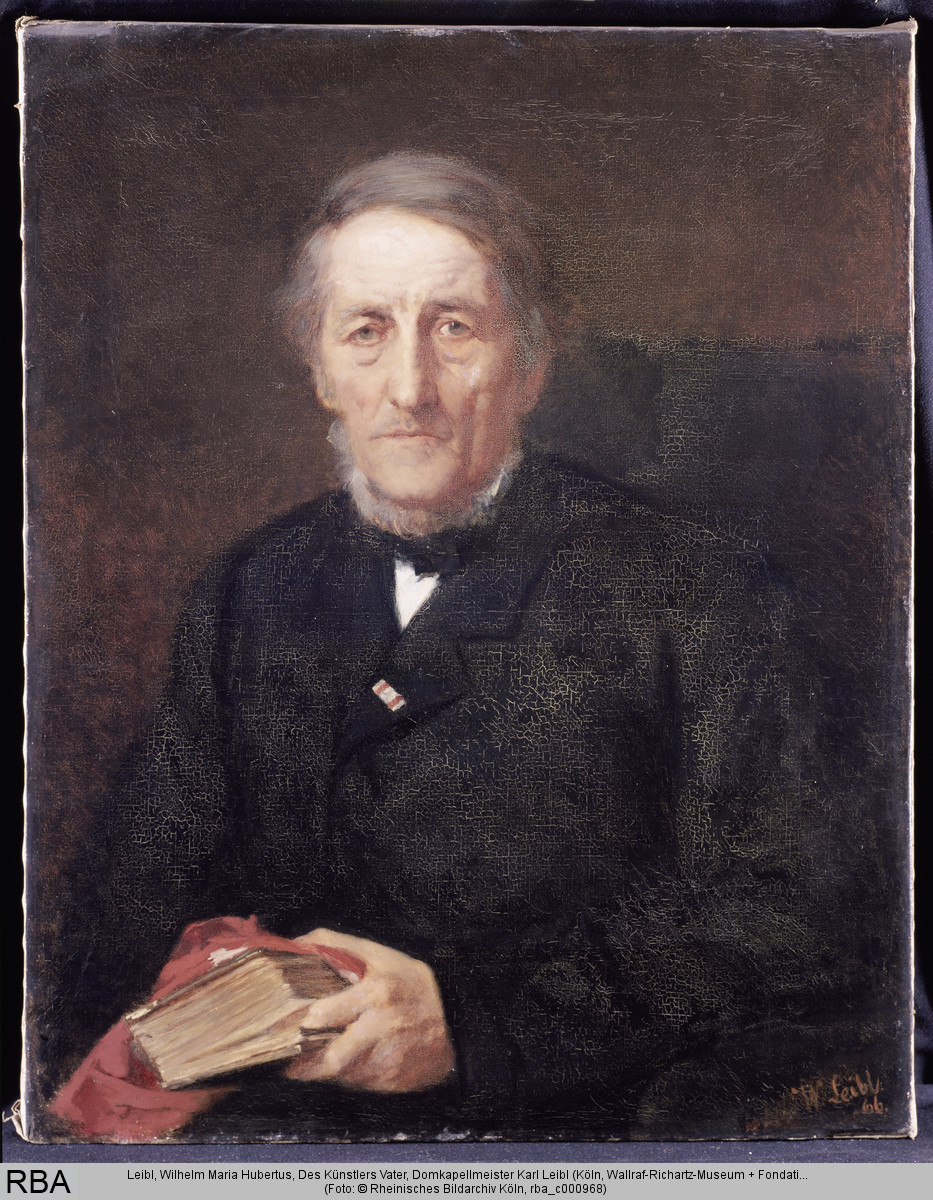
The cathedral conductor Carl Leibl, painting by Wilhelm Leibl, 1866

Carl (Karl) Leibl (3 September 1784 – 4 October 1870) was a German musician, conductor, cathedral organist and cathedral conductor in Cologne.

== Life ==
Born in Fußgönheim (Palatinate), Leibl comes from a family of Bavarian officials and innkeepers and first learned the cooper's trade before he could dedicate himself to music. Leibl first worked as a music teacher at the Bayrischer Hof. In 1826 he became Cathedral Kapellmeister in Cologne and directed the "Verein der Dommusiken und Liebhaberkonzerte" (Association of Cathedral Music and Lover's Concerts) there. In the same year he also took over the direction of the Städtischer Singverein, which in 1827 merged with the Musikalische Gesellschaft to form the new Cölner Concert-Gesellschaft, whose choir still exists today as the Gürzenich-Choir. This society, under the patronage of wealthy citizens, organized its concerts in the Gürzenich Orchestra Cologne from 1857 onwards - from which the Gürzenich Orchestra of the City of Cologne, which still exists today, ultimately emerged. Leibl was active at a difficult time of political and social upheaval. As a result of laws passed after the Napoleonic occupation in 1794, the guilds were dissolved and spiritual foundations, monasteries and 42 Cologne churches were closed down in the course of secularization. As a result, supporting elements of the city's musical life were now missing. In 1815 the city of Cologne became Prussian. The following economic upswing favored the development of the musical life, which was professionalized under Leibls leadership. Through Cologne's participation in the Niederrheinisches Musikfest, which was founded in 1817 and was also held in Cologne from 1821, the city became a centre of attraction for foreign musicians.

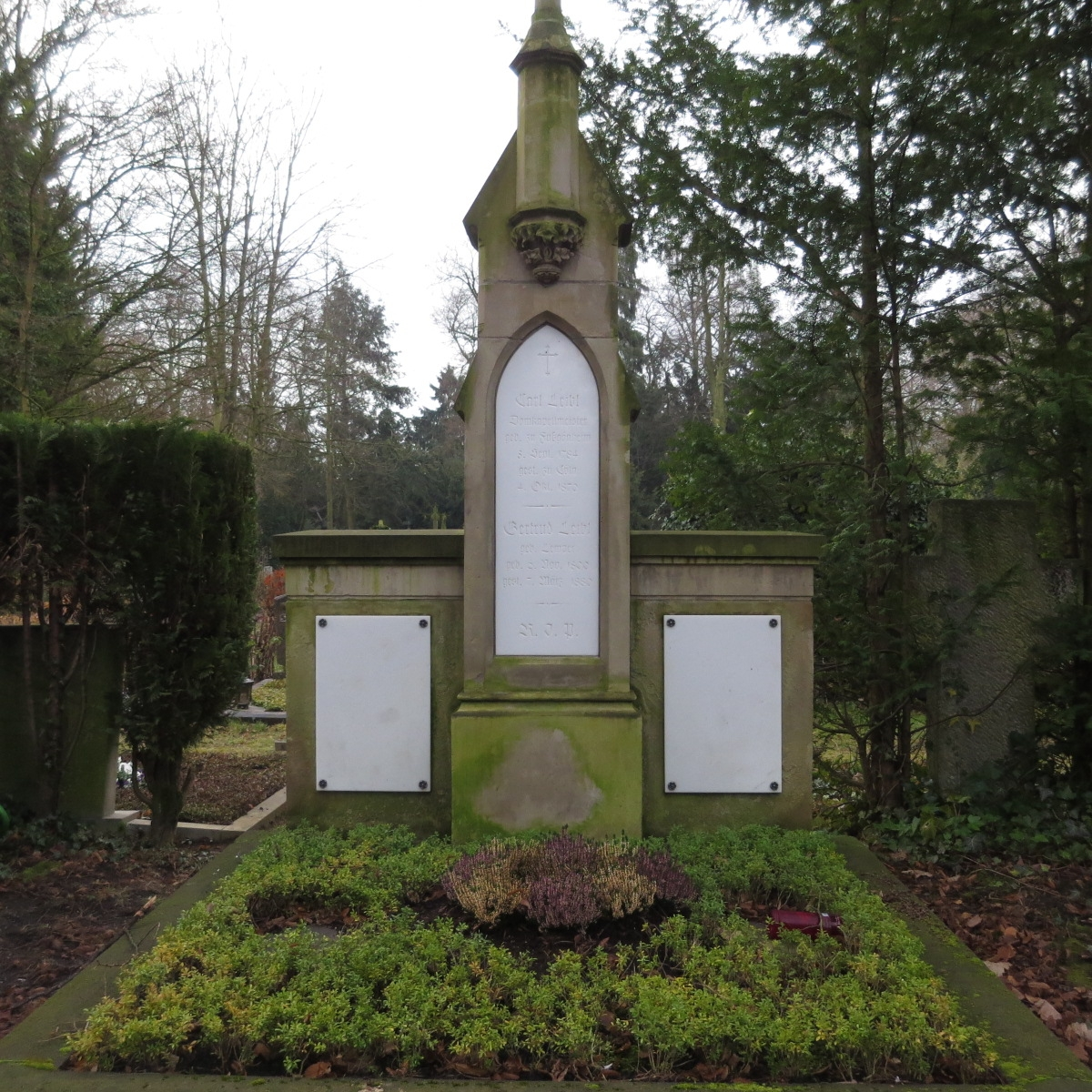
Family grave at the Melaten cemetery in Cologne

Leibl's time includes the rise, climax and end of the classical-romantic church music at Cologne Cathedral in the 19th century. In 1863, the reform of the Cecilian Movement ensured that choral music accompanied by orchestra was banned in Cologne as well. The musical participation of women in church services as choir or solo singers was also prohibited.

The music of the Cologne Cathedral Chapel is a treasure of the Diocesan Library of Cologne as Musikaliensammlung Leibl.

Leibl was married with Maria Gertrud Lemper, daughter of Jakob Lemper, professor at the Gymnasium Montanum in Cologne, and Anna Catharina Franziska Blanck. One of the six children of the Leibl couple was the painter Wilhelm Leibl, who was born in 1844.

His burial place is on the Melaten cemetery in Cologne.

== Work ==
- Festkantate zur Feier der Grundsteinlegung für den Fortbau des Kölner Doms 1842. published in the series Denkmäler Rheinischer Musik
- Messen, darunter Messe Nr. 3 Es-Dur, first published by Eberhard Metternich in the series Denkmäler Rheinischer Musik
- Propriums-versions for choir and large orchestra
- Cantatas
- Fantaisie avec variations : sur la romance italienne O cara imagine : pour le pianoforte; op. 5.
- Karnevalslieder (for example Jerum-Melodie)
