= Richard Rodgers Awards for Musical Theater =

American musical theatre award

American Academy of Arts and Letters Richard Rodgers Award
- Awarded for: development of the musical theatre
- Country: United States
- Presented by: American Academy of Arts and Letters
- First award: 1980
- Final award: 2024

The Richard Rodgers Award is an annual award presented by the American Academy of Arts and Letters, and was created and endowed by Richard Rodgers in 1978 for the development of new works in musical theatre. These awards provide financial support for full productions, studio productions, and staged readings of new and developing works of musical theatre, and to nurture early-career composers, lyricists and playwrights by enabling their musicals to be produced by nonprofit theatres in New York City. The winners are selected by a jury of the American Academy of Arts and Letters. The Richard Rodgers Awards are the Academy's only awards for which applications are accepted.

Former award recipients include Maury Yeston, for Nine; Jonathan Larson, for Rent; Julie Taymor and Elliot Goldenthal, for Juan Darien; Lynn Ahrens and Stephen Flaherty, for Lucky Stiff; Jeanine Tesori and Brian Crawley, for Violet; Scott Frankel, Michael Korie, and Doug Wright, for Grey Gardens; and Dave Malloy for Natasha, Pierre & the Great Comet of 1812.

== Recipients ==
Year	Recipient	Authors	Type	Ref.
1980	Nine	Mario Fratti; Maury Yeston	—	
1981	Child of the Sun	Damien Leake	Production Award	
1982	Portrait of Jennie	Enid Futterman; Howard Marren; Dennis Rosa	—	
1983	—	—	—	—
1984	Brownstone	Andrew Cadiff; Peter Larson; Josh Rubens	—	
1984	Papushko	Andrew Teirstein	—	
1985	—	—	—	—
1986	Break, Agnes, Eulogy for Mr. Hamm, and Lucky Nurse	Michael John LaChiusa	—	
1986	Juba	Wendy Lamb; Russell Walden	—	
1987	Henry and Ellen	Michael John LaChiusa	—	
1987	Lucky Stiff	Lynn Ahrens; Stephen Flaherty	—	
1987	No Way to Treat a Lady	Douglas J. Cohen	—	
1988	Lucky Stiff	Lynn Ahrens; Stephen Flaherty	—	
1988	Sheila Levine is Dead and Living in New York	Michael Devon; Todd Graff	—	
1988	Superbia	Jonathan Larson	—	
1989	Juan Darién: A Carnival Mass	Elliot Goldenthal; Julie Taymor	—	—
1990	Down the Stream	Michael Goldenberg	—	
1990	Swamp Gas and Shallow Feelings	Randy Buck; Shirlee Strother; Jack E. Williams	—	
1990	Whatnot	Howard Crabtree; Dick Gallagher; Mark Waldrop	—	
1991	The Times	Joe Keenan; Brad Ross	—	
1991	Opal	Robert N. Lindsey	—	
1992	The Molly Maguires	Sid Cherry; William Strempek	—	
1992	Avenue X	John Jiler; Ray Leslee	—	
1993	Allos Makar	Scott Frankel; Michael Korie; Valeria Vasilevsky	—	
1993	They Shoot Horses, Don't They?	Nagle Jackson; Robert Sprayberry	—	
1993	Avenue X	John Jiler; Ray Leslee	—	
1993	Christina Alberta's Father	Polly Pen	—	
1994	The Sweet Revenge of Louisa Mae	Mark Campbell; Burton Cohen; Stephen Hoffman	—	
1994	The Gig	Douglas Cohen	—	
1994	Doll	Scott Frankel; Michael Korie	—	
1994	Rent	Jonathan Larson	—	
1995	Splendora	Mark Campbell; Stephen Hoffman; Peter Webb	—	
1996	Bobos	James McBride; Ed Shockley	—	
1996	The Hidden Sky	Kate Chisholm; Peter Foley	—	
1996	The Princess and the Black-Eyed Pea	Andy Chukerman; Karole Foreman	—	
1997	Barrio Babies	Fernando Rivas; Luis Santeiro	—	
1997	The Ballad of Little Jo	Mike Reid; Sarah Schlesinger	—	
1998	Little Women	Alison Hubbard; Allan Knee; Kim Oler	—	
1998	Summer	Erik Haagensen; Paul Schwartz	—	
1999	Bat Boy: The Musical	Keythe Farley; Brian Flemming; Laurence O'Keefe	—	
1999	Blood on the Dining Room Floor	Jonathan Sheffer	—	
1999	Dream True: My Life with Vernon Dexter	Ricky Ian Gordon; Tina Landau	—	
1999	The Bubbly Black Girl Sheds Her Chameleon Skin	Kirsten Childs	—	
1999	The Singing	Lenora Champagne; Daniel Levy	—	
2000	Bat Boy: The Musical	Keythe Farley; Brian Flemming; Laurence O'Keefe	—	
2000	Suburb	Robert S. Cohen; David Javerbaum	—	
2000	The Bubbly Black Girl Sheds Her Chameleon Skin	Kirsten Childs	—	
2001	Heading East	Leon Ko; Robert Lee	Reading Award	
2001	The Spitfire Grill	Fred Alley; James Valcq	Production Award	
2002	The Fabulist	David Spencer; Stephen Witkin	Reading Award	
2002	The Tutor	Andrew Gerle; Maryrose Wood	Reading Award	
2003	Once Upon a Time in New Jersey	Susan DiLallo; Stephen A. Weiner	—	
2003	The Devil in the Flesh	Jeffrey Lunden; Arthur Perlman	—	
2003	The Tutor	Andrew Gerle; Maryrose Wood	—	
2004	To Paint the Earth	Daniel Frederick Levin; Jonathan Portera	Reading Award	
2004	Unlock'd	Sam Carner; Derek Gregor	Reading Award	
2004	The Tutor	Andrew Gerle; Maryrose Wood	Production Award	
2005	Dust & Dreams: Celebrating Sandburg	David Hudson; Paul Libman	Reading Award	
2005	Broadcast	Nathan Christensen; Scott Murphy	Reading Award	
2005	Red	Brian Lowdermilk; Marcus Stevens	Reading Award	
2006	The Yellow Wood	Michelle Elliott; Danny Larsen	Reading Award	
2006	True Fans	Chris Miller; Bill Rosenfield; Nathan Tysen	Reading Award	
2006	Grey Gardens	Scott Frankel; Michael Korie; Doug Wright	Production Award	
2007	Calvin Berger	Barry Wyner	Reading Award	
2007	Main-Travelled Roads	Dave Hudson; Paul Libman	Reading Award	
2008	Alive at Ten	Kirsten A. Guenther; Ryan Scott Oliver	Reading Award	
2008	Kingdom	Aaron Jafferis; Ian Williams	Reading Award	
2008	See Rock City & Other Destinations	Brad Alexander; Adam Mathias	Reading Award	
2009	Cheer Wars	Karlan Judd; Gordon Leary	Reading Award	
2009	Rosa Parks	Scott Ethier; Jeff Hughes	Reading Award	
2010	Buddy's Tavern	Raymond De Felitta; Alison Louise Hubbard; Kim Oler	Reading Award	
2010	Rocket Science	Patricia Cotter; Jason Rhyne; Stephen Weiner	Reading Award	
2011	Gloryana	Andrew Gerle	Reading Award	
2011	Dogfight	Peter Duchan; Benj Pasek; Justin Paul	Production Award	
2012	Witness Uganda	Matt Gould; Griffin Matthews	Reading Award	
2013	Natasha, Pierre & The Great Comet of 1812	Dave Malloy	Production Award	
2013	The Kid Who Would Be Pope	Tom Megan; Jack Megan	Production Award	
2014	Witness Uganda	Matt Gould; Griffin Matthews	Production Award	
2015	String	Adam Gwon; Sarah Hammond	Production Award	
2016	Cost of Living	Timothy Huang	Reading Award	
2016	We Live in Cairo	Patrick Lazour; Daniel Lazour	Reading Award	
2016	Hadestown	Anaïs Mitchell	Production Award	
2017	What I Learned from People	Will Aronson; Hue Park	Production Award	
2018	Gun & Powder	Ross Baum; Angelica Chéri	Studio Production Award	
2018	KPOP	Jason Kim; Helen Park; Max Vernon; Woodshed Collective	Studio Production Award	
2019	Bhangin’ It	Mike Lew; Rehana Lew Mirza; Sam Willmott	Studio Production Award	
2019	The Lucky Ones	Abigail Bengson; Shaun Bengson; Sarah Gancher	Studio Production Award	
2020	In the Green	Grace McLean	Reading Award	
2020	The Loophole	Zeniba Now; Jay Adana	Reading Award	
2021	The Monster	Chelsea Marcantel; Michael Mahler; Alan Schmuckler	Studio Production Award	
2021	Oratorio for Living Things	Heather Christian	Studio Production Award	
2021	TL;DR: Thelma Louise; Dyke Remix	EllaRose Chary; Brandon James Gwinn	Studio Production Award	
2022	Driving in Circles	Jay Eddy	Reading Award	
2023	Lewis Loves Clark	Dylan MarcAurele; Mike Ross	Reading Award	
2023	Marie in Tomorrow Land	Maggie-Kate Coleman; Erato A. Kremmyda	Reading Award	
2024	Far From The Tree	Robert Maggio; Kristin Maloney; Justin Warner	Studio Production Award	
2024	Lighthouse	abs wilson Veronica Mansour	Reading Award	
2025	Black Girl in Paris	Jacinth Greywoode; AriDy Nox	-	
2025	Helsinki	Barrett Riggins; Graham Techler	-	
2025	The Dark Lady	Sophie Boyce; Veronica Mansour	-	

== See also ==
- ASCAP Foundation Richard Rodgers New Horizons Award
