= Suzanne Graff =

American actress

- Born: Milwaukee, Wisconsin
- Occupation: Actress
- Years active: 1998–present
- Spouse: Jerry Gomis

Suzanne Graff is an American actress.

== Biography ==
A native of Milwaukee, Wisconsin, Graff performed onstage for several seasons at the American Folklore Theatre (AFT) in shows such as Lumberjacks in Love which became one of the company's biggest box office hits.

She originated the role of the wisecracking jill-of-all-trades secretary Charlene "Charlie" Osmanski in the Off-Broadway production of Zombies from The Beyond and played the role of the Effy, the gossipy postwoman, in the regional production of The Spitfire Grill. Other New York credits include performances in Twelfth Night with the Riverside Shakespeare Company.

She has performed in national tours of She Stoops to Conquer, As You Like It, Oedipus and A Midsummer Night's Dream. In Milwaukee, she has appeared at the Skylight Opera Theatre and Theatre Tesseract. Other regional credits include She Loves Me at the Indiana Repertory Theatre and in the Twin Cities at the Great American History Theatre and the Jon Hassler Theater.

Since 1998, Graff and her husband, Jerry Gomis, have collaborated as producers for Door Shakespeare theatre, where her acting credits have included roles in productions such as Twelfth Night, the Merchant of Venice, Romeo and Juliet, The Merry Wives of Windsor and Much Ado About Nothing. She studied with acting teachers such as Paul Sills and trained with the National Shakespeare Conservatory in New York.

In 2026, Graff played the role of Hannah in the Skylight Music Theatre's production of the Spitfire Grill
