= The Spitfire Grill =

American dramatic film (1996)

- Theatrical release poster
- Directed by: Lee David Zlotoff
- Written by: Lee David Zlotoff
- Produced by: Warren G. Stitt
- Starring: Ellen Burstyn; Marcia Gay Harden; Alison Elliott; Will Patton; Kieran Mulroney; Gailard Sartain
- Cinematography: Rob Draper
- Edited by: Margaret Goodspeed
- Music by: James Horner
- Distributed by: Castle Rock Entertainment; Columbia Pictures
- Release dates: January 24, 1996 (Sundance); August 23, 1996
- Running time: 117 minutes
- Country: United States
- Language: English
- Budget: $6 million
- Box office: $12.6 million

The Spitfire Grill (also known as Care of the Spitfire Grill) is a 1996 American drama film written and directed by Lee David Zlotoff, and starring Alison Elliott, Ellen Burstyn, Marcia Gay Harden, Will Patton, Kieran Mulroney and Gailard Sartain. It tells a story of a woman who is released from prison and goes to work in a small-town café, The Spitfire Grill.

It won the Audience Award at the 1996 Sundance Film Festival, prompting several distributors to enter into a bidding war in response to the positive buzz, but when finally released, critics as a whole responded less favorably than they had at Sundance. The film is the basis for the 2001 Off-Broadway musical of the same name by James Valcq and Fred Alley.

== Plot ==
Perchance "Percy" Talbot is recently released on parole after five years at Maine Correctional Center in Windham, Maine. The young woman arrives in the small town of Gilead, Maine with hopes of starting a new life. She is given a job as a waitress at the Spitfire Grill, owned by Hannah, whose gruff exterior conceals a kind heart and little tolerance for the Grill's regular customers who are suspicious of and vocal about Percy's mysterious past. None is more suspicious than Nahum, Hannah's nephew, who constantly criticizes Percy and launches his own investigation into her past. His wife, Shelby, has a kinder curiosity and reaches out to Percy, becoming one of her few friends in town.

When Hannah is bedridden after a nasty fall, she places Percy in charge of the Grill despite Percy's lack of experience with cooking and kitchen skills. Seeing that Percy is in need of help, Shelby pitches in to work at the Grill and help Percy win the approval of Hannah, who learns she does need friends. Joe, an attractive young man in town, becomes smitten with Percy and spends some time getting to know her, even introducing her to his father, Aaron. Although Joe eventually proposes that he and Percy get married, she refuses because she feels unworthy to be his wife and tells Joe she's unable to bear children. Joe reveals that he has been approached by a scientist who thinks that the town's trees might have medicinal benefits, which might lead to greater economic prospects for Gilead.

Percy becomes aware of a local hermit in the woods who drops by at night to pick up a sack of canned goods from Hannah. Initially unsuccessful at contacting the hermit, Percy eventually follows him and discovers his makeshift abode in the woods where he crafts aviary art pieces out of bark and other natural materials. Slowly but surely, Percy begins to gain the trust of the hermit. At the same time, she learns from Shelby about how Hannah's missing son, Eli, had enlisted to serve in the Vietnam War and did not return, causing Eli's war-hero father, James, to die from heartbreak and Hannah to become hard-hearted. (There is a brief allusion to James perhaps having piloted a Spitfire aircraft, which presumably gave the Grill its name.) Learning that Hannah has tried unsuccessfully for years to sell the Grill, Percy puts forward the idea to hold a $100-per-entry essay contest to find a new owner via lottery for the Grill. Hannah, believing the contest is Shelby's idea, opens up to the idea and eventually, with promotional help from Percy's former cellmates who work in a tourism call center operated by the prison, the contest proves wildly successful. More and more mail comes in with money for the Grill, and other townspeople are drawn into helping sort through the essays. Attitudes grow more positive, allowing Percy to open up more about her past to Shelby.

However, Nahum remains suspicious of Percy and learns that she was in prison for manslaughter. When he suggests that Percy is a con artist planning to steal the contest funds, Shelby is furious and vouches for Percy. That night, Nahum sneaks into the Grill and moves all the money from the safe into the sack. Before he can do anything further, Percy unwittingly takes the sack into the woods for the hermit. The next day, Hannah finds the safe empty and assumes that Percy stole the money and took off. Influenced by Nahum, the local sheriff gathers a posse of state troopers and some of Gilead's citizens (some with bloodhounds) to search for Percy and her supposed accomplice. Shelby correctly deduces that Percy went to be alone in an abandoned church that they had explored earlier. There, Percy reveals to Shelby that she had been sexually abused from age 9 to 16 by her stepfather, Mason Talbott, who impregnated her and then later assaulted her, leading to her unborn baby's death. After whisking her away from the hospital and to a hotel, Mason drunkenly insulted the memory of Percy's baby, provoking her to kill him with a razor blade, resulting in her incarceration.

The local sheriff arrives at the abandoned church with his posse and takes Percy into custody. When Shelby confronts Hannah over the accusations against Percy, Hannah realizes that Percy gave the sack with the money in it to the hermit. She reveals that the hermit is her shell-shocked, Vietnam veteran son, Eli, who had returned home from the Vietnam War and isolated himself from society despite Hannah's best efforts to win him back, including trying to sell the grill. Fearing that the posse will kill Eli, Hannah and Shelby rush to the sheriff's office and convince Percy to help them save Eli. Running through the woods with the posse on Eli's trail, Percy runs through the river to warn off Eli, but is swept away by the raging waters and drowns. Nahum finds Eli cradling Percy's body downriver and recognizes him when he sees Eli's face.

Percy's death prompts the town's citizens to examine their own conduct towards her more deeply, especially at the funeral service where Nahum publicly confesses that he moved the money and ultimately caused the events leading to Percy's death; he admits that he never truly knew her as he had assumed. Hannah is finally able to reconnect with Eli. Later in the summertime as Gilead is celebrating its town festival, the winner of the essay contest, a young woman named Clare, arrives with her toddler son, Charlie. The citizens of Gilead welcome her enthusiastically, and Hannah shows her to her new home and business as a place for Clare and her son to start life anew.

== Cast ==
- Alison Elliott as Percy Talbott
- Ellen Burstyn as Hannah Ferguson
- Marcia Gay Harden as Shelby Goddard
- Will Patton as Nahum "Caleb" Goddard
- Kieran Mulroney as Joe Sperling
- Gailard Sartain as Sheriff Gary Walsh
- John M. Jackson as Johnny B./Eli Ferguson
- Louise De Cormier as Effy Katshaw
- Ida Griesemer as Rebecca Goddard
- Lincoln and Emerson Grow as Molly Goddard
- Lisa Louise Langford as Jolene
- Forrest Murray as Stuart
- Jim Hogue as Deputy
- Stacy Becker as Clare
- Cliff Levering as Aaron Sperling
- Patti Tippo as Clare's Voiceover
- Ed Cook (voice)
- Malcolm Groome (voice)
- Harry Johnson (voice)
- Gracie Moore (voice)
- Linda O. Cook (voice)
- Sam Lloyd Sr. as Meeshack Boggs

== Themes ==
Overall, the film deals with powerful themes of redemption, hatred, compassion, independence, the economic problems of small towns, the plight of Vietnam War veterans, and, to some extent, female empowerment.

In a pivotal scene when Percy meets Eli for the first time, she sings "There Is a Balm in Gilead". Percy, wracked with guilt over her past, attempts to make Gilead, Maine, the balm to heal her wounds. When Joe mentions the local trees being used for medicinal purposes, this may be another reference to the Balm of Gilead, an ancient medicine made from trees in Gilead. The same hymn is played during her funeral on the organ.

The film somewhat misleads the audience into thinking that it will be Percy who finds redemption, but it is other characters and relationships, and indeed the town itself, that are powerfully redeemed through Percy's actions.

== Background ==
The idea for the film was conceived by Malcolm Roger Courts, long-time director and CEO of Sacred Heart League, Inc., a Catholic nonprofit fundraising and communications organization based in Walls, Mississippi. In the late 1970s, he wished to make a film—an alternative to the ministry of print that was a hallmark of Sacred Heart League, which published and distributed millions of pieces of literature.

With the approval and support of the league's board of directors, Courts began searching for a screenplay that could be produced under the direction of Sacred Heart League's film production subsidiary, Gregory Productions, Inc. Courts and his colleagues read more than 200 prospective screenplays and found most of them lacking in Judeo-Christian values and good story-telling. In the early 1990s, Courts was introduced to Warren Stitt, who eventually became the executive producer of "The Spitfire Grill." Stitt knew of the work of Lee David Zlotoff of MacGyver fame, and an introduction was made. Courts agreed to field screenplay treatments from Zlotoff, and in late 1994, the story of the film was written by Zlotoff.

With private financing from Sacred Heart League, the film was shot in Peacham, Vermont, and Troy, Vermont, in 35 days in April–May, 1995. After editing the film, it was submitted to the Sundance Film Festival in the feature film competition, and was accepted for screening at the 1996 festival in Park City, Utah. Before screening at Sundance, Courts engaged composer James Horner to compose the musical score for the film.

With the three female stars in attendance at Sundance, Courts and his team enjoyed the support of an enthusiastic crowd during the festival screenings. During one sold-out festival screening, a representative of Castle Rock Entertainment viewed the film and contacted her superiors in Los Angeles. A second print of the film was sent by courier to the Castle Rock headquarters for screening by its executives, who promptly offered $10 million for the film's rights, the largest sum paid outright for an independent feature film.

On the heels of being sold to Castle Rock Entertainment, the film won the Audience Award at Sundance. The film was distributed worldwide with only a modest return and lukewarm critical reaction.

Profits from the sale of the film were used to construct a kindergarten through eighth grade school for 450 children in Southaven, Mississippi, located 10 miles from the Sacred Heart League headquarters in Walls.

In 2001, a musical adaptation of the film with a brighter ending, written by Fred Alley and James Valcq premiered at George Street Playhouse in New Brunswick, New Jersey, directed by David Saint and then moved to Playwrights Horizons Theater in New York.

== Release ==
=== Critical reception ===
The Spitfire Grill received mixed to negative reviews.

Critics generally were impressed by the film's efforts, but felt that the script was too underdeveloped and too similar to other films. Roger Ebert wrote "Watching this plot unfold, I was remembering last week's Heavy, which also premiered at Sundance; its cafe was run by an older woman (Shelley Winters), and had a veteran waitress (Deborah Harry) and a young waitress (Liv Tyler), and had a regular customer whose name was Leo, not Joe, although he was played by Joe Grifasi. Also echoing in the caverns of my memory were several other movies about stalwart women running cafes and striding above the local gossip: The Ballad of the Sad Cafe, Fried Green Tomatoes, Staying Together and of course Bagdad Cafe." Ebert also reviewed the film with Gene Siskel, each giving a thumbs down.

Robert Roten of the Laramie Movie Scope wrote "this light character study explodes into a full blown melodrama at the end using a bunch of tired old clichés, like misplaced money, your standard hermit in the woods and an almost laughably melodramatic drowning. Give us a break. With a more imaginative story, this could have been a great movie, but as it is, it's just a C+."

The Spitfire Grill currently holds a 38% rating on Rotten Tomatoes, based on 29 reviews.

=== Accolades ===
Audience Award Dramatic - 1996 Sundance Film Festival

== Home media ==
The film was released on DVD in 1999 and again under the Warner Archive label in 2013. It is available for digital purchase on Amazon Prime.
