= Alexander Levine =

Russian composer

- Born: 17 November 1955 (age 69); Moscow, RSFSR, Soviet Union
- Genres: Classical
- Occupation: composer
- Website: alexanderlevine.com

Alexander Levine (Russian: Александр Левин; born 17 November 1955), is a Russian-born British composer. He writes choral, chamber and orchestral music, publishing through Edition Peters.

== Background ==
Alexander Levine was born in Moscow in 1955. As a child he attended the Gnessin State Musical College (Gnessin School of Music) and then studied at the Gnessin Academy (1976-1980).

In 1992 he relocated to the U.K. where he lives and works at present.

After winning the Wingate Foundation scholarship he studied on the Advanced Postgraduate Composition Course at the Guildhall School of Music and Drama (Master of Music in Composition, 1995).

He started his UK career working on a number of theatre projects. In 1994 he received a commission to write music for a theatre production of “War and Peace” staged at the GSMD (Director Peter Clough). The music was performed live by symphony orchestra. The Times observed in its review: "It is not often you go to the theatre and get an orchestra thrown in: not providing cues for numbers but underscoring dialogue with a grand swell, like a soundtrack for the big screen" (Kate Bassett, The Times, October 29, 1994) Other theatre works of that period: “The Beggar's Opera” and “Love's Labour's Lost” (Director Di Trevis)

Further collaborations include various artists from a wide range of genres: Maria Friedman, Christian Forshaw, Stanzeleit/Jacobson Duo, Darragh Morgan, Mary Dullea, Fidelio Trio, Konstantin Boyarsky, Andrew McNeill, Bozidar Vukovic, Tippett Quartet, Orlando Consort, BBC Singers, 21st Century Choir, Tenebrae, Mariinsky Opera Choir, Russia State Orchestra “Novaia Rossia”, Bel Canto Chorus, Voces8, Paul Phoenix & Apollo5.

== Selected works from Edition Peters catalogue ==
Prayers for Mankind. A Symphony of Prayers of Father Alexander Men’

- US Premiere: October 12, 2012, Milwaukee, Bel Canto Chorus, director Richard Hynson
- Recording: Tenebrae, director Nigel Short, Signum Records. London, 2010.
- Publisher: Edition Peters

The Divine Liturgy of St John Chrysostom

- World Premiere: St. Petersburg, 2009, Mariinsky Opera Choir, conductor Andrey Petrenko.
- UK premiere: March 7, 2013, London. Tenebrae Choir, director Nigel Short.
- Australian Premiere: Aug. 2014, St George's Cathedral, Perth, St George's Cathedral Consort, Director Joseph Nolan (organist)
- Recording: Tenebrae Choir, director Nigel Short, Signum Records, London, 2013.
- Publisher: Edition Peters

Canti Augustini

- World Premiere: December 21, 2013, St. Petersburg, Mariinsky Theatre by Voces8
- Publisher:Edition Peters

Oh, You Wide Steppe

- Recording: Paul Phoenix & Apollo5, Edition Peters Sounds
- Publisher: Edition Peters

Natasha's Waltz

- Recording: State Symphony Orchestra “Novaya Rossiya”, Artistic Director and Chief Conductor Yuri Bashmet.
- Publisher: Edition Peters

The True Light

- Publisher: Edition Peters

Thy Will Be Done

- World Premiere: 2014, by Suzi Digby and the Voce Chamber Choir
- Publisher: Edition Peters

Tibi Solus

- Publisher: Edition Peters

I Am All Along on the Road

- Commissioned by the King’s Singers, UK premiere May 6, 2019, Wigmore Hall
- Publisher: Edition Peters

Our Father (Thy Will Be Done)

- Commissioned by VOCES 8, World Premiere February 8, 2020, St. Andrew’s Anglican Church, Moscow.
- Publisher: Edition Peters

== Discography ==
Oh, You Wide Steppe, arr.

Paul Phoenix & Apollo5, "Journey", Edition Peters Sounds, 2015, EPS002

The Divine Liturgy of St. John Chrysostom

Tenebrae, conductor Nigel Short, Signum Classics, 2013, SIGCD316

Prayers for Mankind (A Symphony of Prayers)

Tenebrae, conductor Nigel Short, Signum Classics, 2010, SIGCD212

Kolokolá

The BBC Singers, cond. James Morgan, Albany Records, 2005, TROY 736

Faces (prelude & fugue for saxophone quartet)

Quartz Saxophone Quartet, Black Box, 2000, BBM1024
