= The Spitfire Grill (musical) =

American musical

- Original Cast Recording
- Music: James Valcq
- Lyrics: Fred Alley
- Book: James Valcq; Fred Alley
- Basis: 1996 film The Spitfire Grill
- Productions: 2001 Off-Broadway
- Awards: Richard Rodgers Awards for Musical Theatre from American Academy of Arts and Letters

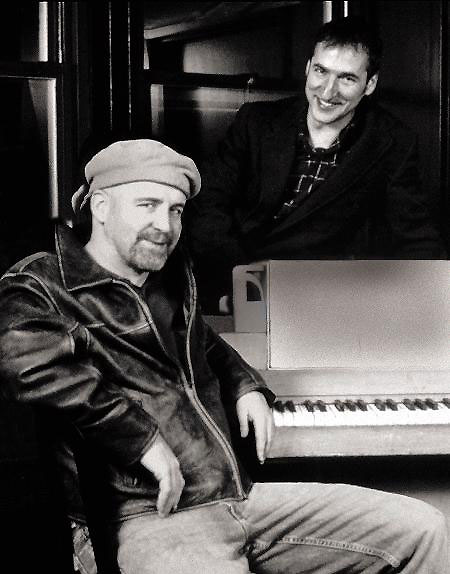
Fred Alley (L) and James Valcq

The Spitfire Grill is an American musical with music and book by James Valcq and lyrics and book by Fred Alley, based on the 1996 film of the same name by Lee David Zlotoff. The off-Broadway production by Playwrights Horizons began previews at the Duke Theatre on 42nd Street on September 7, 2001, and concluded its scheduled run on October 14, 2001. It won the Richard Rodgers Production Award, administered by the American Academy of Arts and Letters. The musical depicts the journey of a young woman just released from prison, who decides to start her life anew in a rural town in Wisconsin. She participates in a journey within the town toward its own tenuous reawakening.

== History ==
Authors James Valcq and Fred Alley had been friends since high-school music camp in 1980, but they did not collaborate until 1994 on The Passage for Alley's American Folklore Theatre in Wisconsin. New York-based Valcq was seeking a follow-up project for the pair after his Zombies from the Beyond closed off-Broadway in 1995. They wanted to create a piece of populist theatre with elements of myth and folktale. Upon seeing the film The Spitfire Grill, they had found their vehicle. Actual writing of the musical commenced in October 1999.

A demonstration tape of a few songs from the score found its way to David Saint, artistic director of the George Street Playhouse in New Jersey. The theatre presented a workshop of the show in June, 2000, featuring Helen Gallagher as Hannah, and produced the world premiere production in November 2000, featuring Beth Fowler as Hannah. Throughout the process, Arthur Laurents mentored the creative team, encouraging them to find their own emotional truth in the material. The ending of the musical is entirely different from the ending of the film.

Ira Weitzman, associate producer of musicals at Playwrights Horizons, and Tim Sanford, the artistic director, saw the George Street production and announced that The Spitfire Grill would open the 2000–2001 season at Playwrights Horizons after a May workshop. One week before the workshop, Alley suffered a fatal heart attack at the age of 38 while jogging in the woods near his Wisconsin home.

Two weeks later, The Spitfire Grill was presented with the Richard Rodgers Production Award. Stephen Sondheim chaired the committee that chose The Spitfire Grill as the winner. The remainder of the group comprised Lynn Ahrens, Jack Beeson, John Guare, Sheldon Harnick, R.W.B. Lewis, Richard Maltby Jr., and Robert Ward.

The off-Broadway production featured Phyllis Somerville as Hannah, Garrett Long as Percy, Liz Callaway as Shelby, Steven Pasquale as Joe, Armand Schultz as Caleb, Mary Gordon Murray as Effie, and Stephen Sinclair as Eli. It was directed by David Saint. The show received Best Musical nominations from the Outer Critics Circle and Drama League, as well as Drama Desk nominations for Garrett Long as Outstanding Actress in a Musical and Liz Callaway as Outstanding Featured Actress in a Musical.

Since the Playwrights Horizons production, The Spitfire Grill has been produced over 900 times worldwide in regional theatres, festivals, stock, community, and school productions. Foreign-language versions have been produced in Germany in 2005; in South Korea in 2007, 2012, and 2015; in Japan in 2009; and in The Netherlands in 2018. Notable American versions include a co-production by American Folklore Theatre (co-founded by Fred Alley) and Skylight Opera Theatre (2002), which featured Phyllis Somerville as Hannah, the West Coast premiere at Laguna Playhouse (2002), which won the OC Award for Best Musical, and the Idaho Shakespeare Festival production in 2006, which was conducted by James Valcq. The musical had its UK premiere at the 2008 Edinburgh Festival Fringe in a production by the Royal Scottish Academy of Music and Drama and its Australian premiere in July 2010 by the Margaret River Theatre Group.

In 2011, American Folklore Theatre produced a 10th-anniversary production that was directed by the composer.

The show premiered in Singapore at the Creative Cube in September 2012. The musical was performed by LASALLE College of the Arts with direction by Tony Knight and musical direction by Ben Kiley. The cast consisted of Erin Clare (Percy Talbott), Alison Eaton (Hannah Ferguson), Timothy Langan (Joe Sutter), Kelly White (Shelby), Emma Etherington (Effy), Vanessa Powell (Caleb) and Brett Khaou (Eli).

The show received its London premiere at the Union Theatre, Southwark, in a production starring Belinda Wollaston as Percy Talbott and directed by Alastair Knights in July 2015. This production was acclaimed as a Top 10 Critic's Choice musical by BritishTheatre.com and was awarded Best New Production of a Musical (Fringe/Regions) in the Broadway World UK Awards.

In 2018, The Spitfire Grill premiered in the Netherlands at the Fontys School of Fine and Performing Arts for a limited run, with direction by Yannick Plugers and musical direction by Rick van den Belt.

== Synopsis ==
Act I

Place: A small town. Time: Not long ago. February. A young woman, Percy Talbott, gazes out the window of her prison cell, from which she is about to be released. In her pocket is a photograph clipped from a travel book with a caption that states "Autumn colors along Copper Creek near Gilead, Wisconsin" ("A Ring Around the Moon"). Arriving in Gilead, Percy reports to the local sheriff, Joe Sutter. He leads her through the deserted streets to a ramshackle diner called the Spitfire Grill, run by a crusty old widow, Hannah Ferguson, who has a bad hip and a sharp tongue. Joe persuades Hannah to take Percy on board and give her work as a waitress.

Percy sets to work in a swirl of small-town suspicions led by Effy, the postmistress and village busybody ("Something's Cooking at the Spitfire Grill"). In the face of all the gossip and Hannah's constant haranguing, Percy begins to wonder whether she made a mistake in coming to Gilead ("Coffee Cups and Gossip"). Her thoughts are interrupted by a cry from Hannah, who has tripped on the stairs and broken her leg. Over the protests of her fiercely protective nephew, Caleb, Hannah has Percy take over the Spitfire. When it comes to cooking, though, Percy is clueless ("Into the Frying Pan"). That night, without explaining why, Hannah reluctantly asks Percy to wrap a towel around a loaf of bread and to leave it near the old stump out back of the grill.

Percy is joined at the Spitfire by Caleb's wife Shelby, an excellent cook. In the heat of the kitchen, the two women are drawn together. Shelby tells Percy about Hannah and Gilead's past, the day her childhood hero went off to war and her hometown changed forever ("When Hope Goes").

Wanting to escape painful memories, Hannah has had the Grill on the real estate market for 10 years with no takers. In a moment of inspiration, Percy proposes a way for Hannah to get rid of the Spitfire and make some money at the same time: a raffle. For $100 and an essay about why they might want the Grill, anyone can enter. At first, Hannah resists, but slowly, something about the craziness of the idea convinces her that it just might work. As the rest of the town watches the long Wisconsin winter stubbornly give way to spring ("Ice and Snow"), the women at the Spitfire plan the details of the contest. Percy and Shelby share a vision of life as they wish it were, while writing the advertisement for the raffle ("The Colors of Paradise").

Caleb spots the contest ads as they begin to appear in out-of-town papers. Without a decent job since the local quarry closed, Caleb has been left trying to sell real estate that no one wants. His frustration turns against a world where being a hard-working man is no longer enough ("Digging Stone").

During a parole session with Sheriff Joe Sutter, Percy tells of her bleak past growing up in the West Virginia coal mine region. Joe, in turn, spills out his dissatisfaction with life in Gilead ("This Wide Woods").

As summer approaches, the first raffle entry arrives in the mail, complete with $100 and a rather depressing essay, which stirs up some of Hannah's old wounds ("Forgotten Lullaby"). That night, while placing the usual loaf of bread out back, Percy encounters a silent visitor. She attempts to make conversation, but the mysterious man merely takes the bread and flees. Weeks go by, and essays begin to pour into the grill from far and wide ("Shoot the Moon").

Act II

Hannah, Percy, and Shelby sit in the Spitfire Grill after hours, reading essays and drinking from a jug of Hannah's infamous applejack. As they read the letters, some funny, some sad, Hannah expresses her appreciation for what Percy and Shelby have done ("Come Alive Again"). Before long, it seems everyone in town is helping Hannah to sift through the letters, and a magical shift occurs, not only at the Spitfire, but throughout Gilead as well.

Late one October night on the back porch, Joe tells Percy that he no longer wants to leave Gilead. He plans to build a house on a plot of land his father has given to him ("Forest for the Trees"). Deeply troubled, Percy abruptly rejects Joe's proposal of marriage and confides to Shelby the harsh details of her life. Impregnated by her stepfather when she was 16, Percy suffered untold abuse resulting in the loss of her unborn child. While on the run, she killed her stepfather with his own straight razor. Shelby comforts Percy and gently sings her to sleep ("Wild Bird").

When Percy awakens, she sees the mysterious visitor and at last realizes he is none other than Eli, Hannah's own son. Eli leads Percy deep into the forest and then to a clearing atop a hill. The leaves have turned to autumn colors and as the sun rises, they burn like flame ("Shine").

Transformed by her hilltop vision, Percy leads Eli back to the Grill to reunite him with Hannah after so many years. In a painful confrontation, Shelby and Caleb recognize Eli and react with such shock at his battered appearance and broken demeanor that Eli flees. Hannah finally admits that Eli had been a deserter in the war. The shame of it killed her husband, and though Hannah has taken care of Eli's basic needs, she has kept his presence in the woods a secret from the entire town. Percy pleads with Hannah to forgive Eli. Day passes into night and Hannah calls out to her son ("Way Back Home"). Out of the shadows, Eli appears in the grill once more. Hannah and Eli tentatively face one another as mother and son.

On the last day of the contest, everybody reads their favorite essays. Finally, Hannah reads the words that have touched her the most - the ad describing the grill, written by Percy and Shelby. In gratitude for their role in reuniting mother and son, while admitting she is not offering much in return, Hannah turns over the Grill to Percy and Shelby ("Finale").

== Critical reception ==
In New York magazine, John Simon wrote, "It is not often that material moves me to tears, but this was one of those occasions. The Spitfire Grill has the heart and soul that your Producers and Full Montys cannot begin to approach. What even in normal times would be a joy is, in these troubled ones, sheer nourishment." He later included the show in his Best of 2001 list. Other critics also commented on the show's poignancy after the September 11, 2001 attacks. "If after the events of recent weeks you need any reason at all to embrace life again, the musical you've been waiting for has arrived. The Spitfire Grill is one of the most heartfelt musicals of recent years, its homespun charms as inviting as a warm winter blanket", wrote Matthew Murray reviewing the show for Talkin' Broadway. The Wall Street Journal's Amy Gamerman wrote, "The Spitfire Grill feels as if it has been transplanted to Times Square directly from an obscure patch of the American heartland. The longing for a place like Gilead, well removed from the big, troublesome world, is real enough – perhaps now more than ever. The show's creators tap into that longing with unembarrassed directness. At a time when cynicism seems downright unpatriotic, sophisticates may find themselves powerless to resist. Well before the show reaches its conclusion, many of the New York city slickers in the audience may be ready to enter Percy's raffle themselves." Elysa Gardner in USA Today wrote that the score offered "some of the most engaging and instantly infectious melodies I've heard in a musical in some time. Valcq's resonant, folk-based orchestrations make the fetching tunes even more accessible and poignant. Open your heart and visit the Spitfire Grill."

Victor Gluck of the Associated Press described it as "a lovely new musical in the Rodgers and Hammerstein tradition." In Show Business Weekly, David Hurst wrote, "The score by James Valcq is a mixture of country, bluegrass, and Broadway-styled pop ballads that is always stirring and pure Americana in sound with heartfelt lyrics by the late Fred Alley." According to Billboard, "In a genre known for being big and brassy, it's always a pleasure to come across a musical that revels in its quiet moments. That's why The Spitfire Grill is like a breath of fresh country air." Jonathan Frank wrote in Sound Advice, "The Spitfire Grill has a simplicity and emotional resonance that has become all too rare in musical theater. This is a show that succeeds by not trying: it simply is." He described the score as "simply astonishing, due no small part to Valcq's stunning arrangements, which consist of folk instruments and instrumentations, acting as a character unto themselves." Variety's Joel Hirschhorn wrote that "Valcq's numbers are consistently exciting, aided by carefully devised orchestrations. More than most musicals, the underscoring feels like an extra character, brimming with creative cello, violin, mandolin, guitar, and keyboard solos. Fred Alley wrote lyrics that contain the ring of plain-spoken, believable truth."

In The New York Times, Ben Brantley wrote, "The songs are shiny with tunefulness, hope, and all-American inflections of country and folk." He said the score "has a gentle American vernacular charm" and the "lyrics have a matching ease and simplicity." Also in The New York Times, Alvin Klein declared the show "a soul-satisfying new musical", "a complete work of theatrical resourcefulness", and "[a] story that flows with grace and carries the rush of anticipation". He continued, "The warm, indigenous American folk sound of Mr. Valcq's score is, harmonically and melodically, as theatrical as it is grassroots. On first hearing, Mr. Alley's lyrics touch a deeper chord, accomplishing the considerable feat of poetically offering inspiration while holding the syrup. ... The musical is freeing. ... It is penetrated by honesty and it glows."

Of the London production, Stephen Collins in British Theatre wrote, "The Spitfire Grill is a musical treat. James Valcq’s score is richly rewarding and creates a genuinely engaging musical atmosphere, which helps shape and drive the narrative. He creates a true musical world for the characters and, within that world, each character has tunes and phrases which assist in illuminating them and their part in the story. There are plenty of thrilling musical passages, some gentle and heartbreaking ones, as well as joyful and colourful (and tuneful) numbers. It’s the kind of score which engulfs you with its charm and spirit and, at the end, you just want to listen to it again." In his article "The Best of 2015" for Live Theatre UK, Collins singled out "Union Theatre's magical enlivening of The Spitfire Grill, a heart-warming but difficult American tale of redemption and fortitude which deserves a further, extensive life in the West End." In The Stage, Mark Shenton found the show "a chamber musical that mines surprising depths in its portrait of the healing qualities of small-town community life. Set to a haunting score, the cast of seven gives it a gritty heart, aching with longing and regret but also hope."

In Harper's Bazaar UK, Lucy Halfhead stated, "the songs all hit their emotional marks - whether rousing or heartbreaking - and propel the action along. It’s thrilling that The Spitfire Grill’s raft of great tunes has been uncovered for a UK audience." Genni Trickett of London Theatre 1 called the show "heart-warming, sincere, thought-provoking, and a jolly good story. Not to mention the original, toe-tapping tunes, which get into your head and refuse to be dislodged, no matter how hard you try." The British Theatre Guide's Howard Loxton wrote of the score: "The songs are part of the storytelling smoothly integrated with a gentle folk influence and an almost operatic treatment in the way they colour in the narrative and elaborate phrases. From individual arias to a complex sextet involving all the characters except a silent outsider, they are beautifully crafted."

== Awards and nominations ==
- The New York/Off-Broadway Production received an Outer Critics Circle Award nomination for Best Off Broadway Musical.
- The New York/Off-Broadway Production received a Drama League Award nomination for Best Off Broadway Musical.
- The New York/Off-Broadway Production was nominated for two Drama Desk Awards: Outstanding Actress in a Musical (Garrett Long) and Outstanding Featured Actress in a Musical (Liz Callaway).
- The London production received Best New Production of a Musical (Fringe/Regions) in the Broadway World UK Awards.
- The Washington DC production received 2 Helen Hayes Award nominations.
- The Los Angeles production received a Dramalogue Award nomination for Best Musical.
- The Laguna production won the OC Award for Best Musical. Actor Misty Cotton (as Percy) received a nomination for Best Performance in a Musical.
- The Chicago production received 3 Joseph Jefferson Award nominations.
- The San Francisco production won the Bay Area Critics Circle Award for Best Musical.
- The Dallas production received 4 Leon Rabin Award nominations including Outstanding Production of a Musical, and won 2.
- The Florida production received 3 Carbonell Award nominations.

== Original cast recording ==
The off-Broadway cast album of The Spitfire Grill was produced by Playwrights Horizons in conjunction with the composer, and has been re-released as a digital download.

== In other media ==
The song "Shine" was featured on the VH1 reality series Off Pitch in 2013. "Shine" was performed by Teresa Fischer on her 2013 album Let It Go. In 2015, Liz Callaway included the song "When Hope Goes" on her career-spanning retrospective album The Essential Liz Callaway. Broadway actress Caitlin Kinnunen sang "The Colors of Paradise" with Spencer Glass on a 2020 segment of the BroadwayWorld web series It's the Day of the Show Y'all dedicated to The Spitfire Grill. The posthumously-released collection It Would Be Enough For Me (2002) features co-creator Fred Alley singing "Digging Stone" as well as the unused song "I Thought I Knew".
