= David Saint =

American thespian

- Born: June 1958 (age 67–68); Boston, Massachusetts, United States
- Occupation: Artistic director
- Parent(s): Paul Francis Saint; Marion Riley

David Saint (born June 1958 in Boston, Massachusetts, US) is an American artistic director at the George Street Playhouse in New Brunswick, New Jersey, US.

== Career ==
Now in his 23rd season at George Street Playhouse, artistic director David Saint has directed thirty five mainstage productions, most recently American Son, Clever Little Lies, Outside Mulingar, Good People, Marlo Thomas and Keith Carradine in Arthur Laurents’ New Year’s Eve, Matthew Arkin in Donald Marguiles’ Sight Unseen, Neil Simon's The Sunshine Boys, William Finn's landmark musical Falsettos, Joan Vail Thorne's The Things You Least Expect, the film noir musical Gunmetal Blues, Inspecting Carol, the world premiere of Arthur Laurents’ 2 Lives, The Last Five Years, Lend Me a Tenor and the world premiere of Charles Evered's Celadine starring Amy Irving. Saint's time in New Brunswick has been marked by collaborations with such artists as Uta Hagen, A.R. Gurney, Arthur Laurents, George Grizzard', Chita Rivera, Eli Wallach, Rita Moreno, Frances Sternhagen, Anne Meara, Dan Lauria, Stephen Sondheim and Jack Klugman.

An ardent advocate for new work, Saint created the Next Stage Festival of New Plays at George Street where the recent Broadway hit and Tony Award-winner Proof by David Auburn was developed by Saint before moving on to Manhattan Theatre Club and Broadway, becoming the longest-running play in two decades and the most produced play during the 2002–03 season. Another successful story emerging from the festival was The Spitfire Grill, which won the prestigious Richard Rodgers Award for New American Musicals and was produced under Saint's direction, winning Drama Desk, Drama-League and Outer Critics Circle award nominations, before becoming one of the most produced plays during the 2004–05 season, generating more than 100 productions.

Recent credits include the national tour of West Side Story, A.R. Gurney's new play The Fourth Wall at Primary Stages, starring Sandy Duncan, as well as the world premiere of Mark St. Germain's The God Committee at Barrington Stage. Other regional credits include Manhattan Theatre Club, Playwrights Horizons, McCarter Theatre, Long Wharf Theatre, Williamstown Theatre Festival, Paper Mill Playhouse, Bay Street Theatre, Walnut Street Theatre and Seattle Repertory Theatre, where he was associate artistic director to Daniel Sullivan, directing many productions including the West Coast premiere of Wendy Wasserstein's An American Daughter. Other productions include two Anne Meara plays: After-Play, in New York and Los Angeles, and Down the Garden Paths, which began at George Street and moved to New York; the national tour of The Cocktail Hour, with Fritz Weaver and Elizabeth Wilson; Fame: The Musical; The Fourth Wall, with Betty Buckley and George Segal; Fourplay, with Elaine May and Gene Saks; Sons and Fathers, with Holly Hunter; and the West Coast premiere of Lend Me A Tenor, as well as world premieres by such authors as Jonathan Larson, Peter Parnell, Jonathan Marc Sherman, Aaron Sorkin, and others. Saint was recently a panelist for the Philadelphia Theatre Initiative for the Pew Charitable Trust, has taught at Bennington College, and directed the short film Celebrity. He is the recipient of the Alan Schneider Award, Helen Hayes Award, Los Angeles Drama Critics Award, and several Drama-Logue Awards. He is currently president of the Laurents/Hatcher Foundation and literary executor of Arthur Laurents' estate. George Street Playhouse
