= New Brunswick Performing Arts Center =

Coordinates: 40.4936°N 74.4444°W

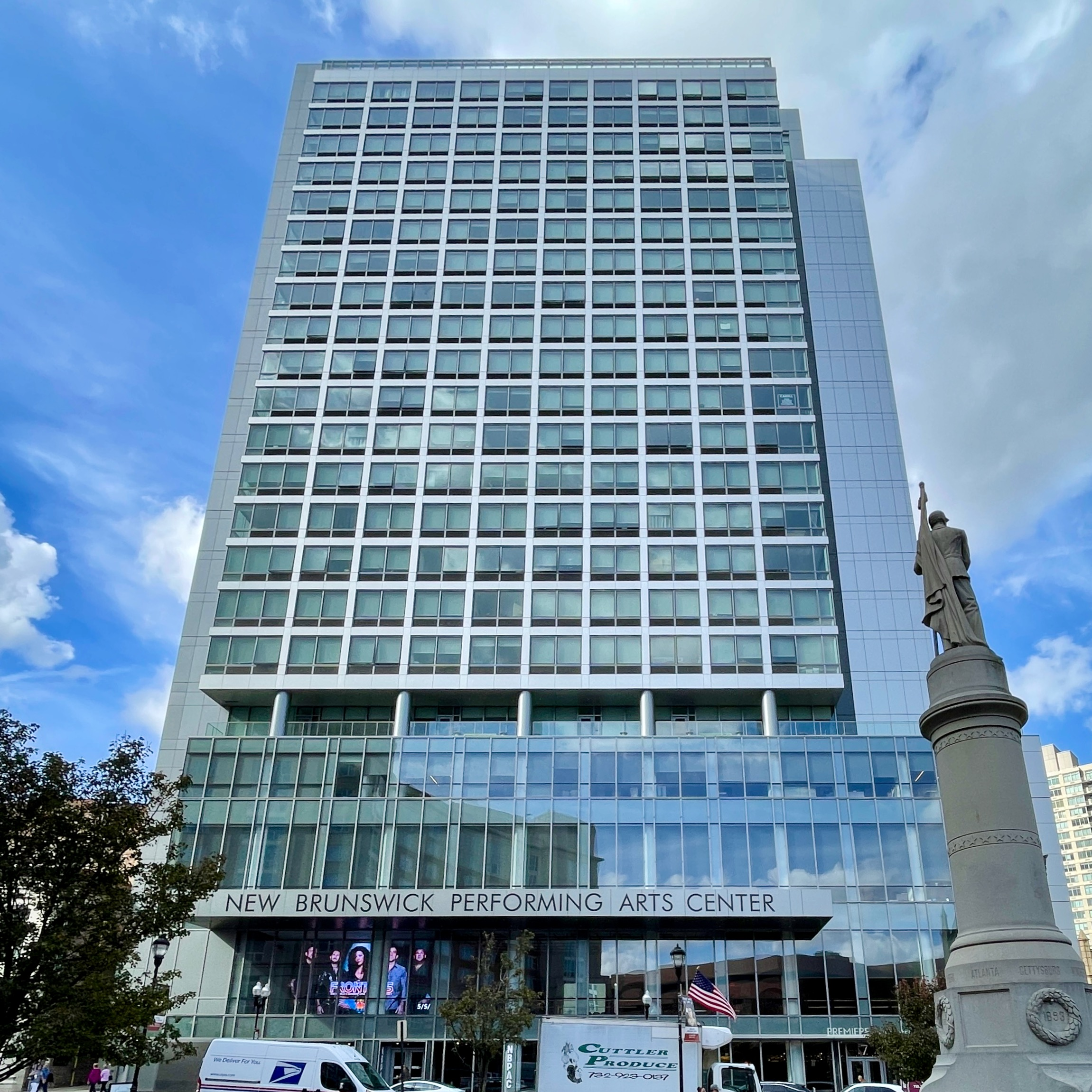

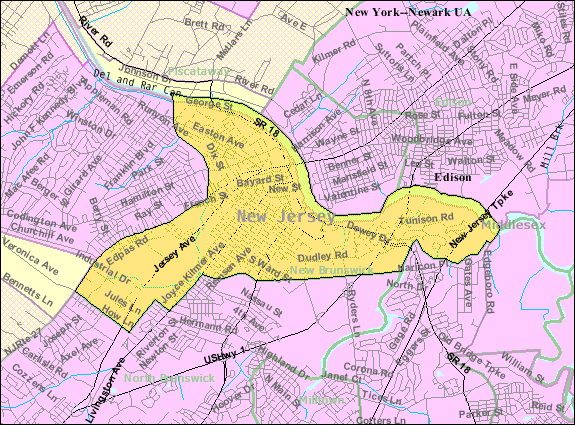
- Location within New Brunswick, NJ New Brunswick Performing Arts Center (New Jersey)

General information
- Type: Mixed-use highrise
- Location: New Brunswick, New Jersey, U.S.
- Construction started: 2017
- Completed: 2019

Height
- Roof: 89.61 m (294.0 ft)

Technical details
- Floor count: 23

Design and construction
- Architect: Elkus Manfredi Architects
- Developer: DEVCO/Penrose

The New Brunswick Performing Arts Center is a complex in New Brunswick, New Jersey's Civic Square government and cultural district, adjacent to the State Theatre. Construction for the US$172 million, 23-story multi-use property began in 2017 and was completed in 2019. Its official opening took place September 4, 2019.

The cultural center is home to American Repertory Ballet, Crossroads Theatre, George Street Playhouse, and the theaters for Rutgers University's Mason Gross School of the Arts.

== Architecture ==
The theater is part of a larger residential and commercial 23-story complex and includes 18 stories of residential units. One of the tallest buildings in New Brunswick, it was designed by Elkus Manfredi Architects and comprises two state-of-the-art theaters, dedicated rehearsal studios, and academic and office space. Atop the complex are 207 residential apartments and 30,000 square feet of office space. There is also a new parking garage with 344 parking spaces.

== See also ==
New Jersey music venues by capacity
