= Northern Sky Theater =

Theatre company in Wisconsin, United States

Coordinates: 45°06′44″N 87°11′35″W

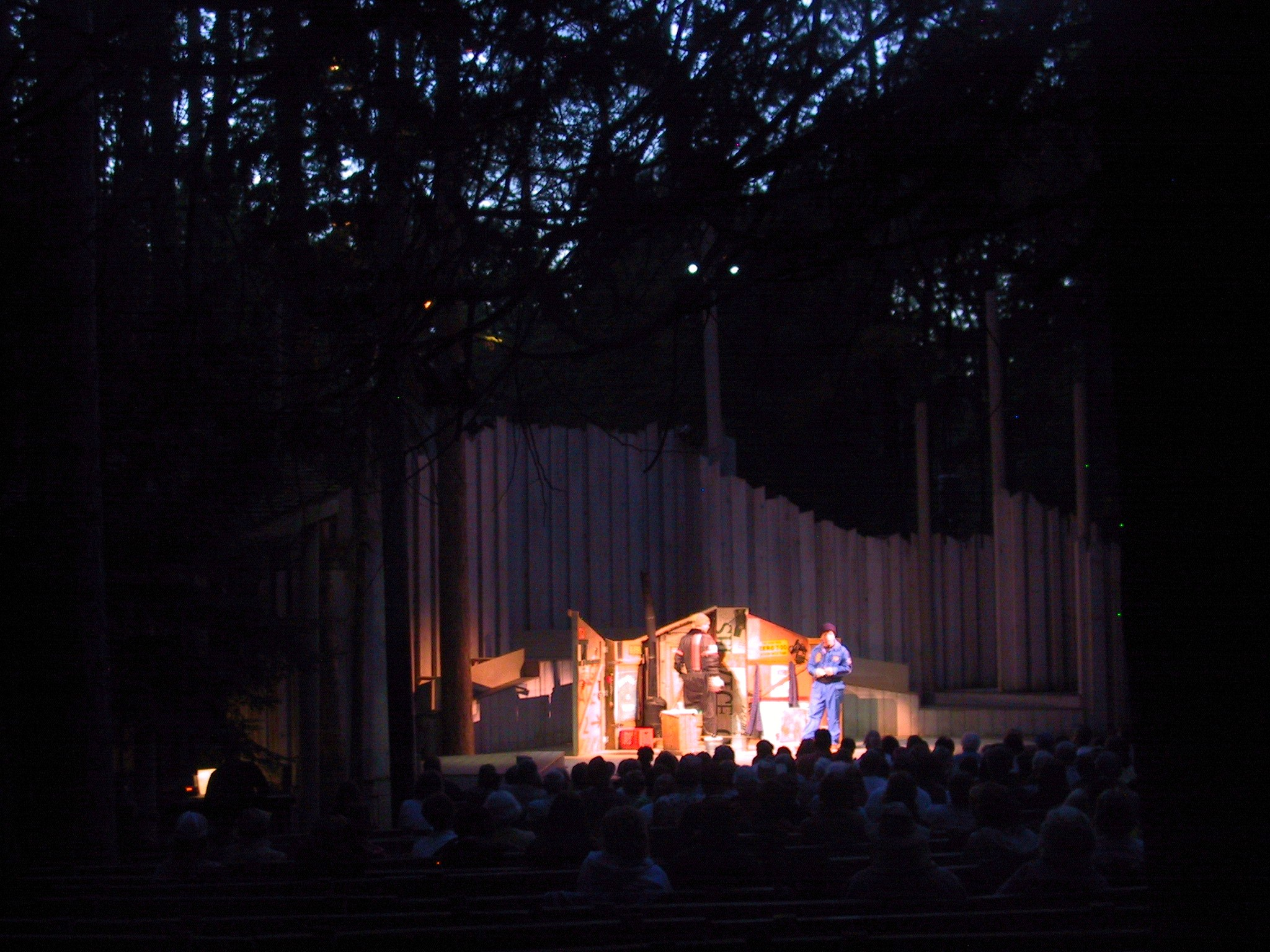
The theater during a play

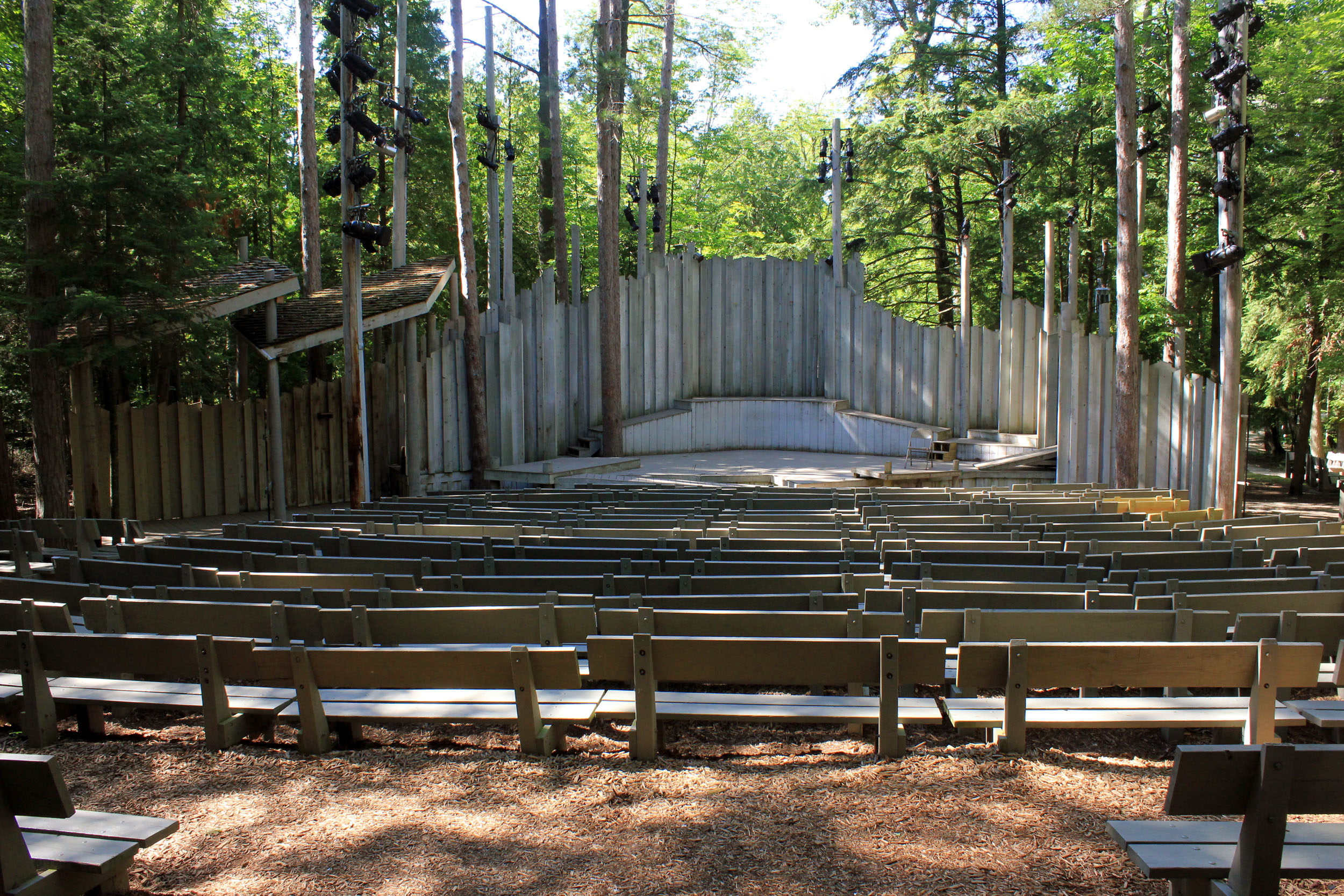
The stage when unused

Northern Sky Theater (formerly known as American Folklore Theatre or AFT) is a professional theater company that creates, develops and produces musicals based on the populist culture and heritage of the United States. Located in Door County, Wisconsin, the company began in 1970 as The Heritage Ensemble, performing on the stage of the 700-seat outdoor theater in Peninsula State Park. In 1990, American Folklore Theatre was co-founded by Fred Alley, Frederick Heide and Gerald Pelrine. In 2015, the company changed its name to Northern Sky Theater.

In 2025, Elisabeth Vincentelli of The New York Times profiled Northern Sky Theatre writing, "At a time when many companies are undergoing identity crises or struggling to connect with audiences, this one endures by programming original musicals anchored in local history, institutions, archetypes, and customs."

== Northern Sky's productions ==
This list of past productions includes musicals such as Loose Lips Sink Ships and Belgians in Heaven, concerts, and anthology productions such as Tales of the Midnight Sun. Productions and year of premier are as follows:

=== Musicals ===
- Mule for Breakfast Again (1990)
- Tongue 'n Cheek (1991)
- Fishing for the Moon (1992) book and lyrics by Fred Alley, with music by James Kaplan
- Northern Lights (1993) book and lyrics by Fred Alley, with music by James Kaplan.
- The Passage (1994) created by Fred Alley and James Valcq.
- Belgians in Heaven (1994) one of the American Folklore Theatre's first productions. Book by Frederick Heide and Lee Becker, with music by Heide and James Kaplan. It ran at the AFT in 1994, 1995, and 1998 before going into hiatus following the death of the theatre's co-founder, Fred Alley. Had further runs at the 2006 Heartland Festival and again at the AFT in 2006 and 2007.
- Our Night in Frog Station (premiered 1995) created by Fred Alley, Fred Heide and James Kaplan.
- Lumberjacks in Love (1996) book by Fred Alley and James Kaplan, with music by James Kaplan.
- Guys on Ice (1998) book and lyrics by Fred Alley, with music composed by James Kaplan.
- Loose Lips Sink Ships (2001) book and lyrics by Jacinda Duffin and Laurie Flanigan, music by James Kaplan.
- Bob Dumkee's Farm (2001)
- The Bachelors (at the Milwaukee Rep in spring 2001, and at AFT in fall 2001), book and lyrics by Fred Alley, with music by James Kaplan.
- Packer Fans from Outer Space (premiered 2002) music by Frederick Heide and additional music by James Kaplan. Described by the AFT in 2002 as its largest production to date, it had a three-location set, costumes that light up, and a talking football.
- The Spitfire Grill (premiered at Playwrights Horizons off-Broadway in 2001 and at the AFT in 2002)
- Muskie Love (2004) created by Dave Hudson and Paul Libman.
- See Jane Vote (2006) created by Laurie Flanigan and James Kaplan.
- A Cabin with a View (2007)
- Main-Traveled Roads (2007) created by Dave Hudson and Paul Libman.
- Guys and Does (2009) has book and lyrics by Frederick Heide and Lee Becker, with music by composer Paul Libman.
- Cheeseheads the Musical (2009) created by Dave Hudson and Paul Libman.
- Life on the Mississippi (2010) lyrics & book by Douglas M. Parker, music by Denver Casado.
- BING! The Cherry Musical (2011) created by Dave Hudson and Paul Libman.
- Victory Farm (2012) created by Emilie Coulson, Katie Dahl and James Valcq.
- Windjammers (2013) created by Robin Share and Clay Zambo.
- Strings Attached (2014) created by Dave Hudson and Colin Welford.
- No Bones About It (2015) created by Dave Hudson and Paul Libman.
- When Butter Churns to Gold (2015) created by Ron Barnett, Peter Welkin and Randi Wolfe.

=== Anthologies ===
- Song of the Inland Seas (1970)
- The Mountains Call My Name (1990) Stories and songs based on the life of John Muir
- Moon of the Long Nights (1991)
- Tales of the Midnight Sun (1992)
- And If Elected (1992)
- Malarkey (1993)
- Goodnight Irene (1994)
- Bone Dance (1995)
- Harvest Moon (1995)
- Fool Me Once (1999)
- A Kettle of Fish (2000)
- Ya, Ya, You Betcha (2003)
- When Dogs Could Talk (2004) Anthology based on Moon of the Long Nights
- Sunsets and S'mores (2009)

=== Concerts ===
- Old Friends: The Music of Paul Simon (1997)
- A Little Folk Music (1998)
- Beneath the Northern Sky: An Evening of Fred Alley's Songs (2002) a tribute to the AFT's founder Fred Alley and features songs from Loose Lips Sink Ships, Guys On Ice, and The Spitfire Grill as well songs from Fred Alley's three CDs. It was assembled by James Kaplan and Jeffery Herbst.
- Sweet Baby James: The Songs of James Taylor (premiered 2000)
- Moonlight and Marshmallows (premiered 2000)
- Eric and Andy: Live in Fish Creek (2002)
- Home For the Holidays (200X)
- Sometimes a Song: The Music of Dan Fogelberg (2008)
- Fish and Whistle: The Songs of John Prine (2006)

== Notable members ==
- Fred Alley – lyricist and librettist, co-founder
- Jennifer Korbee – singer, actress
- Suzanne Graff – actress
- James Valcq – composer, lyricist, and librettist
- Karen Mal - composer, arranger, singer, songwriter, actress, musician
- Frederick Heide - producer, co-founder, performer, playwright, lyricist, librettist
- Laurie Flanigan-Hegge - playwright, actress, musician
- Alice Peacock - singer, songwriter, actress
