= George Street Playhouse =

Theater company in New Brunswick, New Jersey

Coordinates: 40.4936°N 74.4444°W

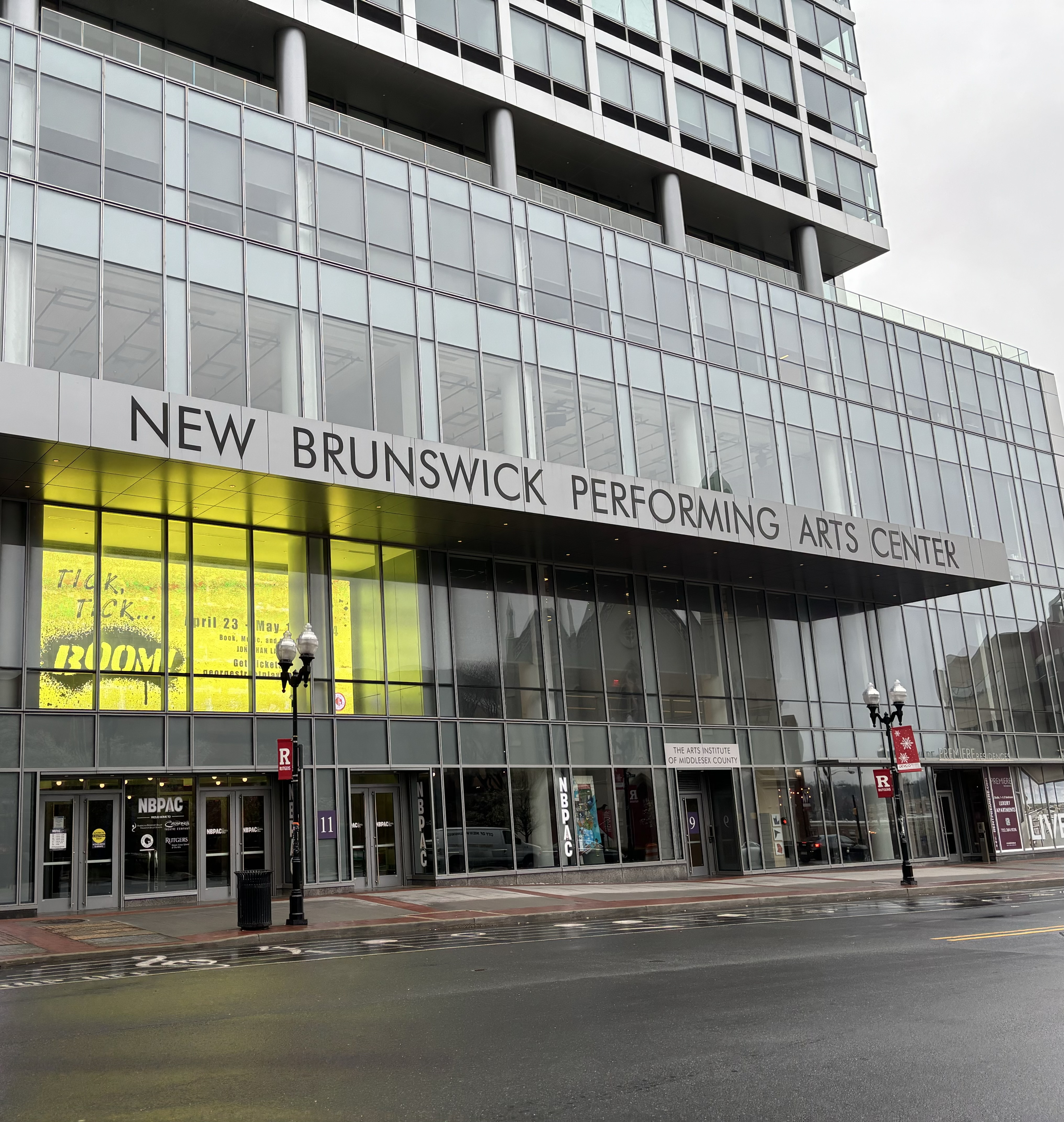
- George Street Playhouse at New Brunswick Performing Arts Center
- Formation: 1974
- Founder: Eric Krebs
- Type: Theatre group
- Location(s): New Brunswick Performing Arts Center; New Brunswick, New Jersey
- Website: www.georgestreetplayhouse.org

George Street Playhouse is a theater company in New Brunswick, New Jersey, in the city's Civic Square government and theater district and resident at the newly built New Brunswick Performing Arts Center. The GSP is one of the state's most prominent professional theaters, committed to the production of new and established plays.

Managing Director Edgar Herrera leads the playhouse with the Artistic Triumvirate comprising Christopher Bailey, Scott Goldman, and Laiona Michelle. George Street Playhouse presents a main stage season and provides a space for both established and emerging theater artists The playhouse has been represented by numerous productions both on and off-Broadway.

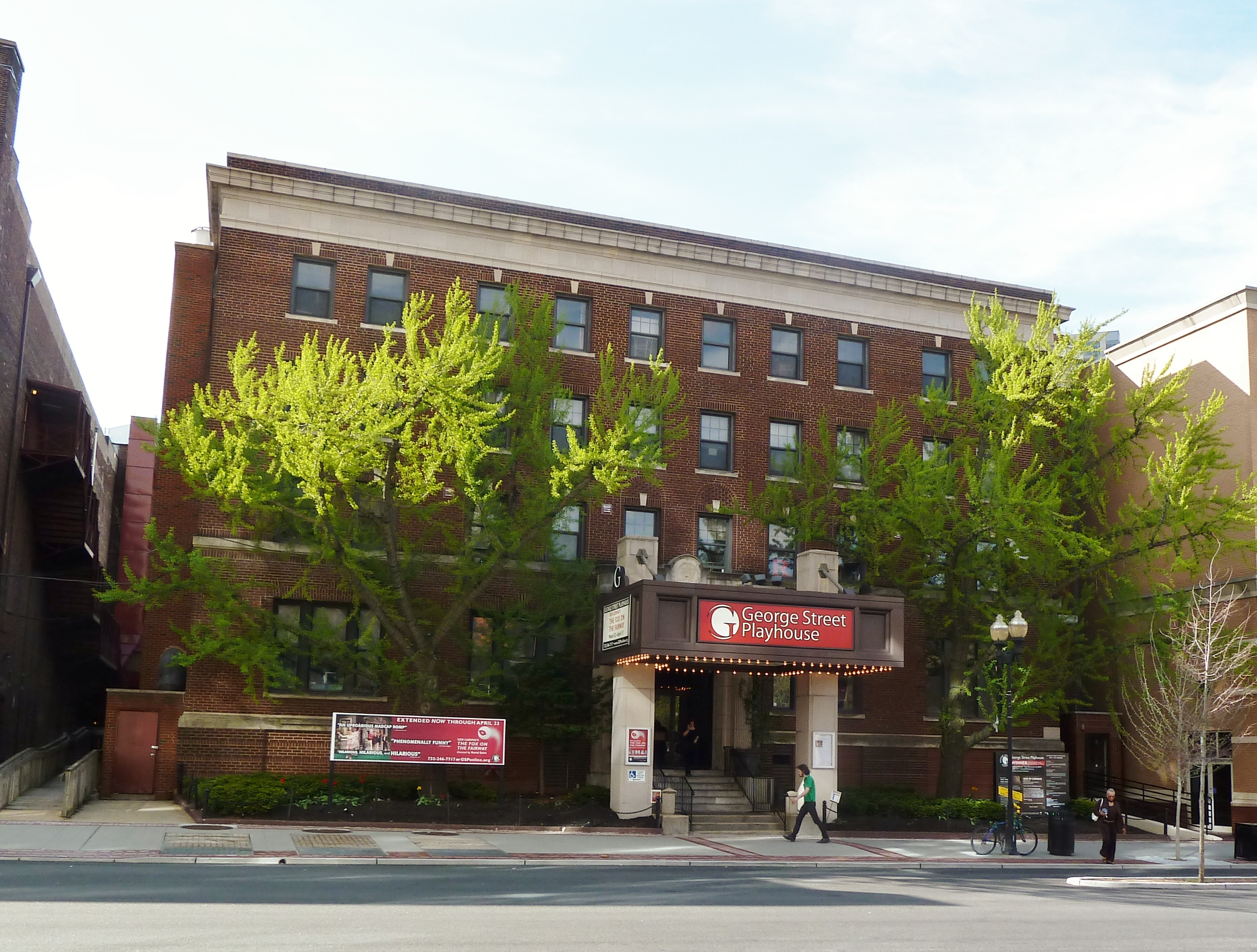
George Street Playhouse, New Brunswick, NJ in 2011

== History and venues ==
Founded in 1974 by Eric Krebs, the theater company was originally located in an abandoned supermarket on George Street and later moved to its current location on Livingston Avenue. In 2017, the playhouse moved to an interim location in the former Agricultural Museum on Cook Campus at Rutgers University In the fall of 2019, George Street Playhouse moved back to the Livingston Ave location into a new mixed-use theater building, now called the New Brunswick Performing Arts Center.

After Eric Krebs, David Saint was the artistic director from 1997 to 2025.

The company is a member of the New Jersey Theatre Alliance.

== Notable productions ==
Recent productions include the world premiere of The Trial of Donna Caine by Walter Anderson, Little Girl Blue: The Nina Simone Musical, a revised version of I Love You, You're Perfect Now Change, An Act of God with Kathleen Turner, American Son by Christopher Demos-Brown, Lewis Black's One Slight Hitch, Gettin' The Band Back Together, and Joe DiPetro's Clever Little Lies. The Tony Award and Pulitzer Prize-winning play Proof, by David Auburn, was developed at GSP during the 1999 Next Stage Series.

- 1994: Swinging on a Star, a revue of the works of Johnny Burke, premieres at GSP, then moves to Broadway.
- 1996: And Then They Came for Me: Remembering the World of Anne Frank is commissioned by GSP for the Touring Theatre Company and is subsequently produced worldwide
- 2000: Down the Garden Paths by Anne Meara, directed by David Saint and starring Eli Wallach and Anne Jackson, premieres at GSP and moves to Off Broadway.
  - Syncopation by Alan Knee, which premiered at GSP in 1999, receives Best New Play Award from the American Theatre Critics Association and opens around the country.
  - The Spitfire Grill, a new musical by James Valcq and Fred Alley and directed by David Saint, premieres at GSP and moves to Off Broadway
  - Ancestral Voices by A. R. Gurney, directed by David Saint and starring among others Tim Daly, Amy Van Nostrand, Paul Rudd and Fred Savage
- 2001: All box office records in the history of GSP are broken with Lady Day at Emerson's Bar and Grill, starring Suzzanne Douglas as Billie Holiday.
  - Venecia by Jorge Accame, adapted and directed by Arthur Laurents starring Chita Rivera.
- 2004: Arthur Laurents updates and directs his Tony Award-winning musical Hallelujah, Baby! starring Ann Duquesnay and Suzzanne Douglas. Following an acclaimed run at George Street Playhouse, the co-production moved to Arena Stage in Washington, D.C. Miss Duquesney is awarded the Helen Hayes Award for her performance.
  - Academy Award nominee Amy Irving stars in the world premiere of Charles Evered’s period romp Celadine.
  - Wasted by OBIE Award-winner Kirsten Childs premieres. This play about substance abuse was funded with a major grant from the Robert Wood Johnson Foundation
- 2005: Inspecting Carol, a comedy by Daniel Sullivan from the Seattle Repertory Theatre, starring Dan Lauria and Peter Scolari, becomes the highest-grossing play at GSP.
  - The West Wing's Richard Schiff stars in Underneath the Lintel, a play by Glen Berger, which sets a new record for per-performance attendance.
- 2006: Jack Klugman stars in The Value of Names by Jeffrey Sweet, with Dan Lauria and Liz Larsen.
- 2007 Artistic Director David Saint celebrates his tenth-anniversary season with the opening of The Sunshine Boys, starring Jack Klugman and Paul Dooley.
  - Rosemary Harris stars in Oscar and the Lady in Pink by Éric-Emmanuel Schmitt, directed by Frank Dunlop.
  - Dylan Chalfy and Ann Dowd star in Doubt by John Patrick Shanley, directed by Anders Cato.
- 2008: Tony® Award Winner Idina Menzel performs a one night only solo concert as the opening of her I Stand Tour.
  - Roger is Dead, a new play written and directed by Elaine May with Marlo Thomas debuts.
- 2009 Come Back, Come Back, Wherever You Are, world premiere written and directed by Arthur Laurents with Shirley Knight.
- 2010: Kathleen Marshall directs the musical Calvin Berger.
- 2011: David Hyde Pierce directs the musical It Shoulda Been You written by Brian Hargrove and Barbara Anselmi, starring Tyne Daly, Harriet Harris, Edward Hibbert, Richard Kline, and Howard McGillin
  - Red (play), with Bob Ari and Randy Harrison
- 2013: Gettin' the Band Back Together had its world premiere before transferring to Broadway and was directed by John Rando.
- 2017: American Son by Christopher Demos-Brown has its world premiere, and is directed by David Saint.
- 2018: Laiona Michelle writes and stars in the world premiere of Little Girl Blue: The Nina Simone Musical.
- 2023–2024 is GSP's 50th season.

== Seasons (1998–present) ==
Season	Show #1	Show #2	Show #3	Show #4	Show #5	Show #6	Show #7
1998-1999	After-Play	Darlene and the Guest Lecturer	Inspecting Carol	The Sea Gull	Jolson Sings Again	Collected Stories	
1999-2000	Do I Hear A Waltz? (Revisal)	Down the Garden Paths	Syncopation	Master Class	Loot	Ancestral Voices	
2000-2001	Wit	The Spitfire Grill	Human Events	Venecia	Old Times	Claudia	
2001-2002	Lady Day at Emerson's Bar & Grill	Talley's Folly	Waiting for Tadashi	The Sisters Rosensweig	CTRL+ALT+Delete	Public Ghosts - Private Stories	
2002-2003	A Night In Tunisia	Dirty Blonde	Let Me Sing	The 75th	The Vibrator	Proof	The Last Bridge
2003-2004	Wilderness of Mirrors	Attacks on the Heart	A Walk in the Woods	Agnes of God	Lips Together, Teeth Apart	tick, tick...BOOM!	
2004-2005	Hallelujah, Baby! (Revisal)	Celadine	The Winning Streak	Lend Me A Tenor	Address Unknown	The Last Five Years	
2005-2006	Two Lives	Inspecting Carol	Underneath The Lintel	The Pillowman	Gunmetal Blues		
2006-2007	The Things You Least Expect	The Value of Names	I Am My Own Wife	Souvenir	Falsettos		
2007-2008	The Sunshine Boys	Doubt	Oscar and the Pink Lady	The Scene	Roger Is Dead		
2008-2009	The Toxic Avenger	The Seafarer	Sight Unseen	The Devil's Music	New Year's Eve		
2009-2010	Come Back, Come Back, Wherever You Are	A Moon to Dance By	Calvin Berger	Sylvia	Creating Claire		
2010-2011	Circle Mirror Transformation	[title of show]	The Subject Was Roses	A Fox on the Fairway	God of Carnage		
2011-2012	It Shoulda Been You	The Nutcracker and I	Red	Twelve Angry Men	The 39 Steps		
2012-2013	One Slight Hitch	The Best of Enemies	Good People	Rich Girl	Venus in Fur		
2013-2014	Gettin' The Band Back Together	Clever Little Lies	One of Your Biggest Fans	I Loved, I Lost, I Made Spaghetti	Our Town		
2014-2015	Outside Mullingar	The Fabulous Liptones	The Whipping Man	Buyer & Cellar	Ernest Shackleton Loves Me		
2015-2016	Murder For Two	The Second Mrs. Wilson	Nureyev's Eyes	Sex With Strangers	My Name Is Asher Lev		
2016-2017	Mama's Boy	Daddy Long Legs	American Son	Bad Jews	Curvy Widow		
2017-2018	I Love You, You're Perfect, Now Change	An Act of God	American Hero	Trying	The Nerd		
2018-2019	The Trial of Donna Caine	A Doll's House Part 2	Little Girl Blue	The Immigrant	Too Heavy for Your Pocket		
2019-2020	Last Days of Summer	My Life on a Diet	Midwives	Conscience			
2021 (Virtual)	Bad Dates	Fully Committed	Tiny Beautiful Things	It's Only A Play			
2021-2022	Dear Jack, Dear Louise	It's Only A Play	Baipas	A Walk on the Moon			
2022-2023	Her Portmanteau	JOY The Musical	Clyde's	The 25th Annual Putnam County Spelling Bee	Tales From The Guttenberg Bible		
2023-2024	The Pianist	Having Our Say	Ibsen's Ghost	The Club	tick, tick...BOOM!		
2023-2024	What The Constitution Means to Me	Gene and Gilda	SMALL	King James	The Shark Is Broken		
2025-2026	An Old-Fashioned Family Murder	Ebenezer Scrooge's Big Jersey Christmas Show	What Became of Us	My Lord, What A Night			

== See also ==
- Mason Gross School of the Arts, which includes the drama and theater conservatory at Rutgers as part of the university's fine and performing arts program
