= Pearl Theatre (New York City) =

Former theater company in Manhattan, New York

Coordinates: 40.761037°N 73.997758°W

The Pearl Theatre Company
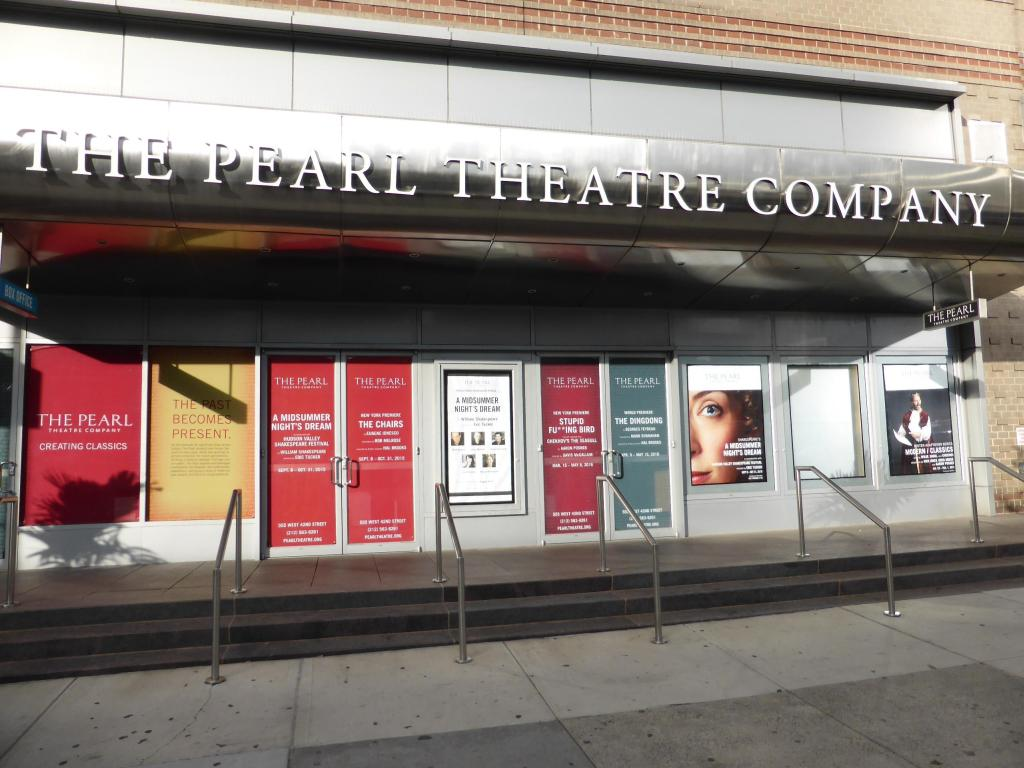
- Pearl Theatre, 2015
- Formation: 1984
- Dissolved: June 2017
- Type: Theatre group
- Location: New York City

The Pearl Theatre Company, commonly referred to as the Pearl Theatre, was a theatre company in New York City. It was established in Chelsea by Shepard Sobel in 1984, with David Hyde Pierce part of the company's first season. The company focused on producing classic works performed by their resident acting company. After moving to St Mark's Place and then to City Center, the company moved in 2012 into their first permanent home, a 160-seat theatre at 555 West 42nd Street between Tenth and Eleventh Avenue in Hell's Kitchen, Manhattan on Theatre Row.

After 33 seasons, the company closed in June 2017, filing for bankruptcy. Members of the company then formed The Resident Acting Company, performing a similar repertory program at the Players Club in Gramercy Park South.

Since 2021, the venue is named Theater 555, owned and operated by producer Eric Krebs.
