= Zombies from The Beyond =

- Original Cast Recording
- Music: James Valcq
- Lyrics: James Valcq
- Book: James Valcq
- Productions: 1995 Off-Broadway

Zombies from The Beyond is an American musical comedy with book, music, and lyrics by James Valcq. It opened Off-Broadway on October 11, 1995, at the Players Theatre. The show examines American ideals and foibles during the era of President Dwight D. Eisenhower in a tone that is often parodistic and sometimes genuinely satiric, all following closely the structural form of grade-B space paranoia films that were popular during the 1950s.

== History ==
Zombies from The Beyond opened to virtually unanimous acclaim from the New York and out of town critics in October 1995 and appeared poised to become a sleeper success. Often commented upon was the deadpan performing style of the material, which seemed to heighten the humor by playing against camp values, and the surprising score which was not rock and roll, but rather an homage to the adult pop sounds of the 1950s such as Perry Como, Patti Page, and Doris Day. Despite the enthusiastic critical response, the show faced severe competition from several high-powered star vehicles that opened within two weeks of its own opening, and the out-of-the-way location of its theatre was another drawback. By Christmas the show had closed.

Shortly thereafter, the show was published by Dramatists Play Service and the cast album was released on Original Cast Records. Zombies from The Beyond has been produced in cities including Chicago, Houston, St. Louis, New Orleans, Detroit, and Minneapolis. Regional, stock, and university productions continue to be done every year. Some notable productions include The Blowing Rock Stage in North Carolina (1997), which featured original cast members Claire Morkin, Matt McClanahan, and Jeremy Czarniak directed by author James Valcq, and the Philadelphia production at Society Hill Playhouse (1997), also directed by Valcq.

== Synopsis ==
Act I

It's 1955. Ike is president, the economy is booming, and "The Sky's the Limit" at the Milwaukee Space Center. Staunch Major Malone (originally played by Michael Shelle), his aide Rick Jones (originally played by Robert Boles), secretary Charlene "Charlie" Osmanski (originally played by Suzanne Graff), Deli delivery boy Billy Krutzik (originally played by Jeremy Czarniak), and the Major's unnervingly competent daughter Mary (originally played by Claire Morkin) are all abuzz at the arrival of rocket scientist Trenton Corbett (originally played by Matt McClanahan) to the Probe Seven Control Room. Via the Probe's space photography equipment, the crew makes an alarming discovery on the television monitor screen: "A Flying Saucer".

Later at the Orbit Room Cocktail Lounge, Rick and Mary dauntlessly dance away the imminent danger ("The Rocket-Roll"). Trenton arrives just in time to hear the saucer buzzing the Galaxy of Coiffures Beauty Salon across the street. After impetuous Rick rushes off to investigate, Trenton attempts to calm the fears of the usually intrepid Mary ("Second Planet on the Right").

Back in the Control Room, a top-secret scheme is hatched to launch a crewed rocket into battle with the hovering spacemobile. Charlie is inducted to measure up the men for suitable spacewear ("Blast Off Baby"). Billy pesters Charlie for a date, quick, before aliens conquer the city. He taps his way into her heart with his "Atomic Feet" and they plan to rendezvous later that night. When the brazen saucer actually lands in the beauty salon, it's "all systems go" for new emergency procedures: Trenton will develop a weapon of mass destruction, Rick will set up a blockade at the beauty shop, and poor Charlie will man the television monitor. Shifty Rick now reveals his true color – (red!) – as he retrieves orders via mysterious walkie-talkie to slip Charlie a mickey and make contact with the invaders for the greater glory of his homeland ("Big Wig").

In Mary's car, Trenton – sworn to secrecy – breaks Mary's heart when he breaks their date ("In the Stars").

Meanwhile, at the Galaxy of Coiffures, Rick encounters Zombina (originally played by Susan Gottschalk), a buxom alien aviatrix bent on procuring he-specimens to play stud on her female-laden planet. Employing her supersonic "Secret Weapon" (a soprano voice so stratospheric that it zombifies), Zombina transforms Rick into a bug-eyed slave to her nefarious demands. She and her entourage of titillatingly tacky "Zombettes" (originally played by the rest of the cast, decked out in intentionally unconvincing 'disguises') sound the shrill soprano war-cry of "Zombies from The Beyond".

Act II

Zombina's tirade of terror has the city on pins and needles ("Dateline: Milwaukee"), yet Trenton and Mary are able to terminate their tiff ("Second Planet Reprise"). Our heroes plan to implement Trenton's newly developed 'amplificator' against subversive enemies, singing gaily: "Don't just hate 'em, exterminate 'em, that's "The American Way!" Charlie emerges from her stupor and a series of spine-tingling clues leads the probe crew to a cataclysmic conclusion about Rick ('I Am a Zombie"). Zombina herself appears on the television monitor screen and proceeds to zombify Trenton and Malone in an amazing 3-D "broad"-cast. Can Mary and Charlie save Milwaukee from this menace?

Zombina, fed up with Rick's inability to perform up to her high standards, resolves to employ her considerable wiles in perpetrating her perverse ploys ("The Last Man on Earth"). Running amok in historical downtown Milwaukee, she plays demolition derby with her stratocruiser and does away with Rick once and for all.

In the chilling climax high atop the Wisconsin Gas Company Building, Mary and Charlie battle it out with Zombina ("Breaking the Sound Barrier"), pitting their brash belting voices against Zombina's coloratura quavers. All appears lost until good old Billy arrives and joins forces with the girls by adding his Geiger-counter tap-dancing to their raucous roundelay, resulting in the hideous demise of Zombina whose formerly formidable voice drops a couple octaves (She bewails: "What a world! I'm belting!") Malone and Trenton are de-zombified, and Milwaukee – (what's left of it) – is saved! Stalwart Major Malone leads the survivors in a stirring hymn of patriotic paranoia, advising everyone, everywhere to "Keep Watching the Skies".

== Critical reception ==
"Dead aim, deadpan, dead-on new musical! With keen-eyed skill to spare, it manages to spoof everything that characterized the old science-fiction B-movies, from cheesy spaceships (with visible wires and erratic flight paths that send them bumping into the sets) to cheap weaponry (an 'amplificator' whose base is an Electrolux vacuum cleaner), stilted language ('apprehensive'), Cold War paranoia, condescension toward women and utter conviction in the infallibility of the United States."

"A splendid surprise! This crazy satire is absolutely enchanting. The book is deliciously silly, while the music and lyrics are sveltely appropriate to subject matter and treatment. The music ranges from Doris Day/Perry Como style romanticism, to Neolithic rock and dewy doo-wop. And there is even one number, "The American Way," that might have been penned by that half-savage Harvard 1950s satirist, Tom Lehrer, with its comment aimed at our nation's enemies: 'Don't just hate 'em, exterminate 'em.' By all means see it - - it's 24-carat fun!"

"Hilarious! Superb! Marvelous! Out of this world! A droll, tongue-in-cheek book and a zippy score. The plot may be silly, but when was the last time you heard a line with the literary overtones of 'Never again will the stars glitter anonymously in the fabric of night like so many sequins on a drape'? A dizzy musical above and beyond the call of hilarity!"

"Takes an irreverent look at America's naïve fascination with space exploration and all the Cold War paranoia that went with it. The songs are funny." "James Valcq's book and songs are 10 times cleverer than anything on Broadway right now! The audience is sent into seventh satire heaven. This is a scream, hoot, and holler from A to Z and will probably turn up on many theatres' rosters thanks to its small set and cast. Zombies is the most hilarious show of 1995-96!"

"Genial, appealing, with an easy-listening score, circa 1955. Delightful!" "This dizzy little musical written and composed by James Valcq is so spaced-out you'll need oxygen to get through it! 'Second Planet on the Right', 'Atomic Feet', and other numbers threaten to crash through the sound barrier."
