= National Shakespeare Conservatory =

Coordinates: 40.7641°N 73.9883°W

- New York City, New York; United States

Information
- Type: Acting
- Established: 1974–1998
- Founders: Philip Meister; Albert Schoemann; Mario Siletti
- Faculty: 15–20
- Enrollment: 45–100
- Length of Program: Two years / Eight-week summer program

The National Shakespeare Conservatory was an acting school in New York City, offering a two-year certificate program and an eight-week summer training program. The Conservatory was founded in 1974 by Philip Meister, Albert Schoemann and Mario Siletti.

== History ==
The Conservatory was an offshoot of the National Shakespeare Company, a professional acting company that toured productions of Shakespeare and the classics to colleges and universities throughout the US and Canada. The Summer Conservatory was first offered at the Byrdcliffe Theatre in Woodstock, N.Y. in 1974, and moved its facilities to Kerhonkson, N.Y. in 1978, where it continued summer operations until 1998.

The Conservatory expanded to a Two Year Program in New York City in 1977 and was situated in the National Shakespeare Company's brownstone studios and offices on West 51 Street near 9th Avenue in Manhattan, along with The Cubiculo, an off-off-Broadway theatre, also owned and operated by the National Shakespeare Company. After Meister's death in 1982, Siletti and Schoemann established The Conservatory as a separate entity from the National Shakespeare Company and moved the operation of the Two Year Program to lower Broadway in Soho.

The National Shakespeare Conservatory was one of the first independent professional actor training programs in the U.S. to become an institutional member of the National Association of Schools of Theatre in 1978; a status gained only through the peer review process of accreditation.

The Conservatory's training emphasized classical plays, utilizing a broad array of contemporary acting techniques – physical, vocal and internal – that enabled the voice and body to support the actor's internal choices. The integration of the physical and vocal with internal techniques with a strong classical base was the hallmark of Conservatory's intensive training.

The Summer Program and the first year of training in the Two Year Program was devoted to intensive classes in scene study, acting technique, Shakespeare, movement, dance, voice, improvisation and music. The second year was devoted to rigorous advanced study in the same areas. As part of the curriculum, the second year included a one-person show and Off-Off-Broadway showcases.

Many of the National Shakespeare Conservatory teachers were professional actors recruited by Meister, Schoemann and Siletti to serve as faculty, beginning their teaching careers at The Conservatory, and subsequently teaching at the Stella Adler Studio of Acting, its undergraduate studio program at New York University, and other colleges and universities.

Beginning in 1994, the US Department of Education (USDE) raised its requirement for the National Shakespeare Conservatory to post a Letter of Credit in order to continue participation in the federal student aid programs. A Letter of Credit is collateral for a portion of a school's federal financial aid, which is put up as assurance that if the school closes, there will be funding to cover the costs of the school's obligation to the USDE. Because of The Conservatory's quality of accreditation review, low student loan default rate and consistent long-term operation as a non-profit organization, The Conservatory considered the amount of the Letter of Credit excessive and contested it in federal court. After a two-year battle with the USDE the federal judge ruled against the school. The National Shakespeare Conservatory then offered to post the Letter of Credit. The Department of Education refused to accept the Letter of Credit from the National Shakespeare Conservatory, and terminated the Conservatory's participation in federal student financial assistance programs, based on the school's failure to provide a sufficient letter of credit in 1996. As a consequence, the school ceased operations of the Two Year training program that fall.

The Summer Conservatory continued to operate for the next two years. In 1996 in addition to its training program, it provided free outdoor performances of Shakespeare in municipal parks in upstate New York, under the banner Catskill Shakespeare until the school closed in late 1998.

== Faculty ==
- Philip Meister - Artistic Director and Master Acting Teacher. Deceased.
- Mario Siletti - Head of Acting, Also headed faculty of Stella Adler Conservatory. Deceased.
- James Tripp - Master Acting Teacher, current Head of Acting and Master Teacher at the Stella Adler Studio of Acting.
- Peter Lobdell - Movement, Currently teaches at Amherst. Physical coach for the original Broadway productions of The Elephant Man and Equus.
- Alice Winston, Master Acting Teacher. Deceased.
- Joanne Munisteri - Movement, Speech, Acting.
- Lisa Jacobson - Movement, Acting. Deceased.
- Robert Perillo - A Master Voice Coach in New York City and director with such companies as Jean Cocteau Repertory in New York City.
- Joan Evans - Movement, Currently teaches at the Stella Adler Studio of Acting and New York University.
- Casey Kizziah - Acting, voice and speech. Deceased.
- Angela Vitale - Voice and Speech, Currently teaches at the Stella Adler Studio of Acting.
- Sandra Cavanaugh - Voice and Speech and body Alignment, currently artistic director of New Heritage Theatre Company.
- Jane Armitage
- Eloise Watt - Shakespeare
- Fay Simpson - Movement
- Joseph Siravo - Voice and speech
- Marc Falcone - Music and Sight Singing
- Gerard Rusak - Voice, Operatic vocalization
- Gregory Wolfe - The Sonnet Project(summer only)
- Mark Zeller - Voice and Speech
- Dana Zeller-Alexis - Acting
- Robert Blumenfeld - Dialects
- Tanis Hugel - Movement
- William Joseph McBride - Movement-Stage Combat-Stage Management
- Tom Dale Keever - Theater History

== Administration ==
- Albert Schoemann - Director, Deceased.
- Pamela Hare – Administrative Director/Registrar

== Notable alumni ==
- Suzanne Graff
- Diana Scarwid
- Annabelle Gurwitch
- Park Overall
- Miguel Perez
- James Wolfe
- Quint Spitzer
