= Eric Krebs (producer) =

American Theater Producer)

- Born: December 13, 1944; Danbury, Connecticut, U.S.
- Occupations: Theater producer; educator
- Spouse: Suzanne Karp Krebs
- Children: 2

Eric Krebs (born December 13, 1944, Danbury, Connecticut) is an American theater founder and manager, producer, and educator.

== Career ==
Krebs' father was a German communist who fled from the Nazi regime. When Krebs was three, his parents divorced, and three years later, his father died.

After graduating from Morris Hills Regional High School in Rockaway, New Jersey, Krebs studied English at Rutgers University, wrote plays, and became involved in theater. In 1967, he started a part-time graduate program at Rutgers and launched a theater in New Brunswick called Brecht West. In 1974, he moved the theater into a former Acme supermarket, renaming it George Street Playhouse for its new location. He started with six plays and 110 subscribers. About a decade later, with the expansion of Johnson and Johnson, a new location had to be found. Thus, in 1985, George Street Playhouse moved to its current location on Livingston Ave, New Brunswick, into a renovated former YMCA building. After three seasons, Krebs left the Playhouse later saying "I outgrew it and it outgrew me". In Manhattan, he founded and directed the Off-Broadway John Houseman Theater Center and Douglas Fairbanks Theater. He operated the Playroom Theater in Manhattan. He owns and operates Theater 555 in Manhattan, formerly called the Pearl Theatre. Krebs created more than 150 productions over the course of his career. and wrote 15 plays, one about his father.

Krebs' parallel academic career led him to become a Professor of Theater Arts at Rutgers University, now in emeritus status. He also taught at Baruch College, City University of New York, until his retirement. He is committed to making theater accessible to young people, and as such, he developed the School Theater Ticket Program and other online programs to make theater affordable.

== Personal ==
Krebs is married to Suzanne Karp Krebs; they have two children.

== See also ==
- Theatrical Index:Krebs
- Krebs Theatrical Management, LLC
