= Skylight Music Theatre =

Skylight Music Theatre, known until January 2012 as Skylight Opera Theatre, is a professional light opera and musical theatre company located in Milwaukee, Wisconsin. Founded in 1959, Skylight performs in the 358-seat Cabot Theatre at the Broadway Theatre Center in Milwaukee. Offering a broad spectrum of works, including Gilbert and Sullivan and other light opera, small-scale operas and musicals, the company is known for its all-English repertoire.

== Description ==
Skylight's artistic director is Michael Unger. The founder of Skylight was Clair Richardson, and Francesca Zambello is a former artistic directors. The company is based at the Broadway Theatre Center, a building that it has owned since 1993, in Milwaukee's Historic Third Ward District. It rents space in the building to other arts organizations and offers set-building and other services to these organizations.

The company gives over 100 performances each season. One of Skylight's specialties has been the production of Gilbert and Sullivan operas. The company has also established a reputation for an adventuresome repertoire, encompassing baroque opera, operetta, contemporary chamber operas, musicals and original musical revues. The company also offers smaller productions in the smaller Studio Theatre in its building, as well as a free cabaret after Friday and Saturday night performances in the Cabot Theatre.

Skylight operates an arts-in-education program, called Enlighten, that provides free classroom workshops, residencies and performances for the Milwaukee Public Schools. In 2012, over 13,000 students viewed or were otherwise engaged by Enlighten programs. The mission of the company is "to bring the full spectrum of musical theatre works to a wide and diverse audience in celebration of the musical and theatrical arts and their reflection of the human condition."

Skylight Music Theatre is a non-profit organization with a $3.2 million annual budget and an endowment. In addition to ticket sales, it raises funds through the rental of sets, costumes, theatres and public spaces in its theatre center, which it owns and operates. It also receives contributions from the United Performing Arts Fund, the National Endowment for the Arts, Wisconsin Arts Board, CAMPAC, Theatre Communications Group, The Pew Charitable Trusts, and various foundations, corporations, and individuals.

== History ==
=== Development of the company ===
Skylight was founded in 1959. Sprague Vonier, the program manager at WTMJ television, public relations agent Clair Richardson decided to add to the cultural variety of Milwaukee by founding a coffeehouse, like those in San Francisco, with live beat poetry and folk music. They rented an empty building next to Richardson's office. Soon, at a nearby fundraising event for another of their cultural projects, Bel Canto Chorus, two church musicians, Jim Keeley and Ray Smith, gave an impromptu performance of Gilbert and Sullivan songs. Vonier and Richardson asked them to put on a show in their empty space above the coffeehouse. The theatre opened with a holiday puppet show. Next, Keeley and Smith starred in a 13-week run of a revue, "An Evening with Gilbert and Sullivan" that was a surprise hit. More revues and a variety of shows followed. In June 1960, the little theatre produced a piano-only production of Cosi fan Tutte. A nearby outdoor space was acquired, and the company produced more small-scale Italian operas and operettas, alternating with Gilbert and Sullivan pieces.

Richardson continued to run the company, attracting donors, borrowing singers from other opera companies and expanding the repertoire to French, German and other operas, an all-black production of Weil's Lost in the Stars and Jerome Kern musicals, which fitted the company's intimate space and modest finances. Colin Cabot joined the company in 1974 as an assistant. Richardson died in 1980, leaving Cabot as managing director. Stephen Wadsworth and Francesca Zambello directed operas for the company in the early 1980s, increasing the company's artistic standards. In recent decades, the company has presented foreign works in English. The company staged its first world premiere, Richard Wargo's Ballymore, in 1999. The premiere attracted national attention. The success of that project led to the company receiving a large grant to finance a two-year residency at the Skylight for Wargo. Another premiere was The Little Prince, an opera by Rachel Portman, in 2004.

=== Later productions ===
The 2006–07 season included Humperdinck's Hansel and Gretel, South Pacific, the contemporary American comic opera Tartuffe, Smokey Joe's Cafe, and Gilbert and Sullivan's Patience. 2007–08 included Carlson's The Midnight Angel, Irving Berlin's White Christmas, La traviata, Temperley's Souvenir and The Spitfire Grill (With music written by a Skylight music director, James Valcq). 2008–09 featured La bohème, The Producers, Blues in the Night, I Do! I Do! and The Pirates of Penzance.

After a crisis over the summer of 2009, as described below, the company staged its 50th anniversary season. The 2009–10 season included The Barber of Seville, Plaid Tidings, The Marriage of Figaro, A Day in Hollywood/A Night in the Ukraine and the first licensed production of Rent. Its 2010–11 season included Dames at Sea, H.M.S. Pinafore, Jacques Brel Is Alive and Well and Living in Paris, Così fan tutte, a 2007 work by Joshua Schmidt and Adding Machine – The Musical. A November 2010 review of the company's H.M.S. Pinafore praised the performances, technical aspects and conducting and commented that the production "handsomely adds luster to the G&S tradition at Skylight. ... Bill Theisen's direction and choreography are full of invention and very funny". Seven productions were scheduled in the 2011–12 season.

=== 2009 crisis and recovery ===
In June 2009, at the conclusion of the 2008–09 season, popular long-time artistic director Bill Theisen and several other staff members were dismissed due to a projected budget deficit and the economic downturn. The position of artistic director was eliminated, and Theisen's administrative responsibilities were assigned to the company's recently hired managing director, Eric Dillner. New productions were to be staged by directors hired for each show. Theisen's colleagues, including music director Jamie Johns (who was fired on June 18, 2009, for speaking out on the dismissals), company donors, and other supporters protested the firings, contacting board members, distributing petitions and staging demonstrations outside the theatre and the board room. The Milwaukee theatre community reacted strongly, through social media and in blogs. Mainstream media, such as the Milwaukee Journal Sentinel and Milwaukee Radio 620 WTMJ, encouraged the company to reconsider their action. Many suggested that managing director Dillner be ousted.

On July 17, 2009, the Board sent letters withdrawing the contracts of two local actors over what the company considered disloyal comments on Facebook. This move, in turn, further angered Theisen, who revoked an earlier offer to direct four works on a freelance basis during the season. Former artistic director Richard Carsey, who had been asked to return to music direct two productions, next resigned, writing to the Board, "The Skylight is being destroyed by Eric and Suzanne's leadership. I can't support this, even by working on productions. .... I passionately ask you to reverse this course of events." James Valcq, another Skylight music director, also resigned from his scheduled engagements. Over the next few days, two dozen of the other artists scheduled to perform in or work on the company's upcoming season resigned in protest at the firings. On July 23, the Board voted to retain Dillner despite the many calls for his dismissal, and Board President Hefty resigned from the Board. The Board offered to rehire Theisen to work with Dillner, but Theisen declined.

On August 5, 2009, Eric Dillner resigned his position. The Board immediately retained former Managing Director Colin Cabot as interim artistic director and former Managing Director Joan Lounsbery as interim managing director. Cabot soon announced that many of the artists who withdrew would return for the Skylight's 50th season, and Theisen agreed to direct the four productions that he had earlier offered to helm. On September 23, 2009, former Skylight CFO Amy S. Jensen was named managing director, and on October 14, 2009, Theisen was re-hired as artistic director. Following the first of these announcements, benefit fundraisers for Skylight were held in Milwaukee and New York City, the latter coordinated by artists engaged over the years by Skylight and dubbed "The Sky Is Not Falling".

In the company's February 2010 newsletter, John Stollenwerk, the new board president, announced that the company had raised over $200,000 plus other large gifts for maintenance and replacement of the ageing building systems at the company's Broadway Theatre Center; a matching fund of $250,000 was created by a group of donors; and the Board set a goal of eliminating the company's debt in four years or less. The ThirdCoast Digest wrote in July 2010, "A year after a summer of strife and financial crisis, the Skylight Opera Theatre appears to be righting itself", reporting that after continued successful fundraising, the company's budget for 2010–11 was $3.2 million, while the building required about $1 million in renovation work over the next several years.

From 2015 to 2022, Jack Lemmon served as Skylight Music Theatre's executive director. Brian Till is president of the company.
