= Calvin Berger =

- Music: Barry Wyner
- Lyrics: Barry Wyner
- Book: Barry Wyner
- Basis: Cyrano de Bergerac
- Premiere: August 31, 2006: Gloucester Stage Company
- Productions: 2007 Pittsfield; 2010 New Brunswick, New Jersey; 2018 Los Angeles, California; 2025 Newcastle, Australia

Calvin Berger is a 2006 musical with book, lyrics, and music written by Barry Wyner. Its story is loosely based on Edmond Rostand's 1897 play Cyrano de Bergerac.

== Plot ==
Calvin Berger, a high school senior, is smitten by Rosanna but because of his appearance, particularly the size of his nose, he feels insecure. Rosanna just treats him like a friend but is attracted to the handsome newcomer Matt, who would like to talk to her but is inhibited by being nervous and shy. Rosanna uses Calvin as a go-between to set up a date, and Calvin exploits this role to "date" Rosanna by using Matt as his physical stand-in feeding him the lines to entice her. Rosanna does not get along with Bret, another girl, who likes Calvin and realizes that he has a crush on Rosanna. When Matt gains more confidence and thinks that he can communicate without Calvin's support, Rosanna discovers the deception. Matt has to regain Rosanna's trust and love, while Calvin realizes what he has done and that his preoccupation with his physical appearance led him astray. He discovers that Bret has been there for him all along and finds love.

== Synopsis ==
Act I

On the first morning of their last year of high school, four seniors have a "Security Meltdown". Calvin frets about the size of his nose, which prevents him from pursuing the girl of his dreams, Rosanna. Rosanna is having a meltdown of her own, yearning to find her "thing" and be more than just a pretty face. Calvin's best friend, Bret, longs to be seen as a potential girlfriend and not just a girl friend. Matt, the handsome new kid in school, fears that his poor speaking skills will keep him from making friends.

Calvin's school year starts with a bang: Rosanna speaks to him for the first time, inviting him to a meeting for a new charity she is starting. She then has a bumbling encounter with Matt, and though they are perfect strangers, there is instant attraction ("I Can See Him Now").

Later, Calvin and Bret are in study hall chatting about movies. Rosanna interrupts and asks Calvin to meet her that night ("Don'tcha Think?"). He takes this to mean a date, and shows up with a love poem for her... only to hear her confess her feelings for Matt. She asks Calvin to speak to Matt, since they are both on the wrestling team, and find out if he likes her. Though heartbroken, Calvin agrees ("It Just Wasn't Meant to Happen"). In the locker room the next day, Calvin speaks to Matt, who says he likes Rosanna but gets tongue-tied around girls. Calvin laments having the opposite dilemma: verbal wit without good looks. In a hilarious duet ("We're The Man"), they hatch a scheme to win Rosanna's affection by combining Calvin's words with Matt's looks.

In preparation for Matt's first date with Rosanna, Calvin writes love notes for Matt to give her. He tries to coach Matt on what to say, but discovers that Matt has a lousy memory, except for rap lyrics. Thus, Calvin must — quite awkwardly — teach Matt through the use of rap ("Never Know"). When the big night comes, their plan works like a charm. But it pains Calvin to see Matt kiss Rosanna.

Meanwhile, in a showstopper ("Saturday Alone"), Bret sings of her desire to be with Calvin, instead of home alone. Just then, Calvin calls and invites her over. She shows up at his house dressed to the nines, whereupon he asks her for help writing love notes to Rosanna. We see here that Bret is Calvin's Cyrano, so to speak, afraid to express her feelings for him.

Back at school, Calvin playfully asks Rosanna how things are going with Matt. Rosanna raves about Matt's brilliance and says she loves him for his beautiful words, not his looks ("More Than Meets the Eye"). Calvin is staggered. This means Rosanna really loves him. Calvin writes Rosanna a note confessing his feelings, and explaining that the words she has fallen in love with are his ("Act One Finale").

Act II

Calvin shares a playful moment with his Mr. Potato Head doll, envying its ability to change facial features ("Mr. Potato Head"). He then takes the confession note to Matt to give Rosanna that night. To Calvin's dismay, Matt has decided he no longer wants help ("Graduation Day"), but Calvin convinces him to deliver this one final note. Calvin cancels plans with Bret for that night ("Saturday Alone — Reprise"), so he will be ready when Rosanna learns the truth.

On the date, Matt hilariously blunders and calls Calvin begging for assistance. In an update of Cyrano's balcony scene, Calvin feeds Matt lines through his cell phone earpiece. Things go awry, and Rosanna storms out before Matt can give her Calvin's last note. Growing suspicious of Calvin's motives, Matt reads the note himself.

In the emotional peak of the second act, Calvin is confronted by Bret, who is fed up with his insensitivity to her feelings, and by Matt, who now sees that Calvin was using him. Rosanna looks on and learns that she's been tricked. Suddenly everyone is screaming at Calvin ("The Fight"). The scene culminates with Calvin getting punched in the nose and everyone singing a quirky lament ("How Can I Compete With That")?

The final scenes crescendo to a Bachelor Auction that Rosanna has organized for her charity. Calvin must make amends with the other characters, especially Matt ("We're The Man — Reprise"). Along the way, he realizes that Bret has secret feelings for him ("Perfect For You"), just as he does for Rosanna. He questions which of the two girls is truly right for him. Meanwhile, Matt must win back Rosanna's affection without assistance from Calvin, and Bret and Rosanna share a moment of female bonding ("Calm, Cool and Collected"). By the time the four friends take their places for the Bachelor Auction, each has found new self-confidence and acceptance of their own imperfections ("Finale").

== Musical numbers ==
Act I

- Opening Dream
- Security Meltdown
- I Can See Him Now
- Don'tcha Think?
- It Just Wasn't Meant to Happen
- We're The Man
- Never Know
- Saturday Alone
- More Than Meets the Eye
- Act One Finale

Act 2

- Second Dream
- Mr. Potato Head
- Graduation Day
- Saturday Alone (Reprise)
- The Fight
- How Can I Compete With That?
- We're The Man (Reprise)
- Perfect For You
- Calm, Cool and Collected
- Finale

== Production history ==
The world premiere of the musical took place on August 31, 2006, to September 17, 2006, at the Gloucester Stage Company in Massachusetts. In 2007, it was produced by the Barrington Stage Company at the Athanaeum in Pittsfield, Massachusetts. Its third production took place at the George Street Playhouse in New Brunswick, New Jersey in 2010 with Kathleen Marshall as director.

In 2018, Standing Room Only, Graceful Productions, and Actor's Equity Association presented a staged reading of the musical at the Hudson Backstage Theatre in Hollywood, California. The production ran from August 10 through August 12, 2018. Starring, Jason Eric Testa (Calvin), Joshua Bassett (Matt), Grace Kaufman (Rosanna), and Julia Lester (Bret).

In 2025, CALVIN BERGER makes its return to Australia in a new production by producer Seb Smee for his company, Hyde Entertainment. Amber Curby has been attached as the show's Director, making her Directorial Debut. The cast includes Jude Schillert (Matt), Zoe Chan (Bret), Finlay Page (Rosanna), and Seb Smee will be joining the cast as Calvin. The production is presented by a new program by Civic Theatre Newcastle, UpStage at the Playhouse - and will be staged in the Civic Theatre Playhouse from July 4, 2025, before the opportunity for a proposed tour.

== Awards & Nominations ==
Year	Award	Category	Nominee	Result
2005	Jerry Bock Award	Excellence in Musical Theatre	Barry Wyner	Won
2025	CONDA Awards	Best Musical Production	Hyde Entertainment	Nominated
2025	CONDA Awards	Best Ensemble - Musical	Hyde Entertainment	Nominated
2025	CONDA Awards	Excellence by a Performer in a Leading Role - Musical	Seb Smee	Nominated
2025	CONDA Awards	Excellence by a Performer 18 and Under in a Leading Role - Musical	Finlay Page	Nominated
2025	CONDA Awards	Excellence by a Performer 18 and Under in a Supporting Role - Musical	Judea Schillert	Nominated
2025	CONDA Awards	Excellence by a Music or Vocal Director	Gabrielle Connett	Nominated

== Cast recording ==
The Original Cast Recording of Calvin Berger was released September 25, 2012, on Sh-K-Boom Records featuring Noah Weisberg, Krystal Joy Brown, David Hull and Dana Steingold.
