= Belinda Wollaston =

Australian musical theatre actor (born 1983)

- Born: Belinda Wollaston; 9 August 1983 (age 43); Penrith, New South Wales, Australia

Belinda Wollaston (born 1983 in Sydney, Australia) is an Australian musical theatre actor.

Wollaston is a graduate of the NIDA Singer, Actor, Dancer and Young Actors Studio; and the prestigious Talent Development Project. She has performed extensively in Cabaret, and major musical theatre productions in the UK, Australia, New Zealand, and Asia.

Wollaston made her debut in Songs From My Hairbrush: The Bedroom Mirror And Me, to sellout audiences at Kabarett Junction (a Sydney Cabaret venue). It is regarded as the show that began the trend of younger performers (as opposed to older performers) performing full length cabaret shows.

2003 proved to be a defining year in Wollaston's career, with her commercial musical theatre debut in the smash hit musical Mamma Mia!, often touted as the world's most successful and entertaining musical. Belinda spent two years performing in the Australian touring production of the show, which took in Melbourne, Brisbane, Sydney, Perth, Adelaide, New Zealand, Singapore and Hong Kong.

In August 2005 she made her Sydney Theatre Company debut in the musical Summer Rain, gaining considerable audience acclaim for her performance.

In 2006 Belinda starred in a production of Putting It Together at the Seymour Centre in Sydney. Later in 2006 Belinda starred as Kate McGowen in the Australian production of the Broadway musical, Titanic alongside her longtime friend and fellow musical theatre actor Hayden Tee. In 2009 Wollaston went on to perform in Shane Warne The Musical. 2011 Belinda saw further success, with lead roles in Doctor Zhivago and Jekyll & Hyde.

Wollaston moved to London in 2014 to pursue a career on the West End.

== Broadway ==
In early 2006 Wollaston travelled to New York where she worked with some of the theatre world's biggest names, including Stephen Sondheim and Stephen Schwartz. Wollaston also performed at a number of events including 'Broadway Cares', and at Cabaret venues in New York.

== The West End ==
Wollaston moved to London in 2014 to pursue a career on London's west end. Following lead roles in the Spitfire Grill at the Union Theatre (2015), and after a successful run of Through The Mill at the London Theatre Workshop (2015) and the Southwark Playhouse (2016), Wollaston made her West End debut in Ray Rackham's re-titled Judy! She reprised her original role, playing Judy Garland during her palace years at the Arts Theatre London.

== Critical acclaim ==
In 2016 Wollaston was nominated for Broadway World's Best Lead Actress in a Musical following her performance as Judy Garland in Ray Rackham's Through the Mill at the Southwark Playhouse. Her 2015 performance as Percy in the Spitfire Grill won her the Craig Dodd Award for Best Actress in a Leading Role.

== Personal life ==
Bellinda Wollaston is an open lesbian. She expressed her will to marry with her fiancé Alice in the Channel 5 documentary: The Secret Life of the Long Haul Flight (2017).
