= John Jiler =

American playwright, novelist, and journalist

- Born: 1946 (age 79–80); New York City, U.S.
- Education: University of Pennsylvania
- Alma mater: University of Hartford
- Occupations: Playwright; novelist; journalist
- Notable work: Avenue X Dark Wind; Sleeping With the Mayor
- Spouse: Elizabeth Hovey
- Children: 2
- Awards: Richard Rodgers Award; Edward Kleban Award; Jerome Fellowship
- Website: www.johnjiler.com

John Jiler is an American playwright, novelist, and journalist living in New York City.

== Early life ==
Jiler was born in New York. His father, Milton W. Jiler, was a financial analysis. Jiler started his education at the Riverdale Country School. He then attended the University of Pennsylvania and the University of Hartford.

== Career ==
After completing his education, Jiler began working as an actor. He performed at the Hartford Stage Company, the Public Theater, and other venues. He won the Chicago Drama Critics Award.

After acting, Jiler started writing. His first play, African Star was done at the Eugene O’Neill Playwrights Conference. He has been awarded a Jerome Fellowship, a Weissberger Prize from New Dramatists, and the Harold Arlen Award. For his musical Avenue X he won the Richard Rodgers and Edward Kleban Awards. Avenue X began at New York's Playwrights Horizons and has played some fifty cities around the world. His plays have also been performed at Labyrinth Theater and The Kennedy Center. His "Rosenberg\Strange Fruit Project," a collaboration with clarinettist Lee Odom, has been performed at 59E59 and the Edinburgh Festival, where it was nominated for an Offie.

Jiler's first book, Dark Wind was published by St. Martin's Press and was called “a classic” by the Village Voice. His most recent, Sleeping With The Mayor was a New York Times Notable Book Of The Year.

As a journalist, he has written for publications such as The New York Times, The Village Voice, and The Nation.

== Family ==
Jiler is married to historian Elizabeth Hovey. They have two children, Jake and Stella.
