= Bel Canto Chorus =

The Bel Canto Chorus is a Milwaukee-area community chorus, and one of the oldest musical organizations in Wisconsin.

== History ==
The choir was first founded in 1931 as the Festival Singers of Milwaukee. The group first consisted of four women and four men, who performed Hans Gruber's Festival Mass in the chapel of Milwaukee's St. Mary's Hospital. The choir soon increased to about 72 in the 1940s.

After Thomas Stemper resigned as director of the Festival Singers in 1947 due to failing health, Father Francis Drabinowicz, pastor of Milwaukee's St. James Catholic Church became the director. The choir was renamed the Bel Canto Choir, and its numbers reduced to 60. Under Drabinowicz, the choir sang a mix of sacred music, folk tunes, comic ballads, and popular songs. They began to sing at least once a year in the Pabst Theater, one of the city's premier arts venues.

In 1956, James Keeley took over the direction of the Bel Canto chorus. Keeley had previously served as a language teacher and organist at local Catholic churches. (While at the Bel Canto, Keeley also became the first music director of the Skylight Opera Theatre.) Under Keeley, the Bel Canto Chorus became known for performing Handel's Messiah, performing it 15 times over his 32 years as director.

Keeley grew the size of the chorus and the scale of its performances. The chorus grew to 180 members, often performing with the Milwaukee Symphony Orchestra. The chorus engaged the services of such renowned soloists as Robert Merrill, Eileen Farrell and Jan Peerce. Keeley changed the repertoire of the chorus to focus on works such as Verdi's Requiem, Walton's Belshazzar's Feast, and Berlioz's Requiem.

The chorus commissioned Gian-Carlo Menotti to write Landscapes and Remembrances for the United States' bicentennial. The work was also recorded and broadcast by PBS. Menotti also invited the chorus to perform at his Spoleto Festival in Italy. While in Italy, Bel Canto also performed a mass for Pope Paul VI at St. Peter's Basilica on July 4, 1976. In the next several years, the chorus performed Carmina Burana in Mexico City and Menotti's Missa O Pulchritudo at Spoleto and the Vatican. The Missa O Puchritudo had also been commissioned by the chorus.

In 1988, Richard Hynson was selected as director of the Bel Canto Chorus after Keeley's retirement. Hynson emphasized increased musicianship, and the chorus' size decreased to about 100 members. Hynson complemented well-known choral works such as Haydn's Creation and Brahms' Requiem with new and less-known choral works, such as Penderecki's Agnus Dei and Ariel Ramírez's Missa Criolla.

In 2024, Hynson retired and was succeeded by Jonathan Laabs as music director.

== Director ==
Music director	Tenure
Thomas Stemper	1931–1947
Francis Drabinowicz	1947–1956
James A. Keeley	1956–1988
Richard Hynson	1988–2024
Jonathan Laabs	2024–Present
