= Fred Alley =

American dramatist

Fred Alley (1962–2001) was an American musical theatre lyricist and librettist who died unexpectedly just as his work gained national recognition. His collaboration on the musical The Spitfire Grill with composer James Valcq won the American Academy of Arts and Letters' prestigious Richard Rodgers Production Award for 2001. Premiered at the George Street Playhouse in New Jersey and produced Off-Broadway by Playwrights Horizons, it received Best Musical nominations from the Outer Critics Circle and Drama League, as well as two Drama Desk nominations. The cast album was released on Triangle Road Records.

The Spitfire Grill has become one of the most frequently performed recent musicals with more than 600 productions to date, not only in every major American city but in Canada, Germany, South Korea, and Japan as well. In 2008 the show had its UK premiere at the Edinburgh Festival Fringe.

Alley was the co-founder and artist-in-Residence at American Folklore Theatre (AFT) in Door County, Wisconsin, a populist theatre with a seasonal audience of 50,000 performing original musicals that further the knowledge and appreciation of the heritage of the United States with local and regional settings and themes. It was at AFT that Alley first collaborated with Valcq on a musical called The Passage. Also at AFT, Alley collaborated on more than 20 original shows with composer James Kaplan, director Jeffrey Herbst, co-founder Doc Heide, and frequent guest artists Paul Sills and James Maronek.

Alley was the librettist and lyricist of Guys on Ice, Lumberjacks in Love, and The Bachelors, all of which began at AFT and set box office records in frequent productions at the Milwaukee Repertory Theater.

He was honored posthumously with the 2002 Mark R. Sumner Award for distinguished achievement in the U.S. outdoor drama movement.

Alley was also an actor and singer who performed on the AFT stage for 20 consecutive seasons. His tenor voice can be heard on his recordings The Lake, Door Christmas, and the posthumously released collection It Would Be Enough For Me.

Alley died on May 1, 2001, of a previously undiagnosed heart condition while jogging near his Door County, Wisconsin home.
