= James Valcq =

American musical theatre composer

James Valcq (born 1963 in Milwaukee, Wisconsin) is an American musical theatre composer, lyricist, and librettist, as well as an actor and arts administrator. He contributed to various theatrical works.

== Education ==
Valcq holds a BFA from the University of Wisconsin–Madison with an applied voice major and an MFA from NYU’s Musical Theatre Writing Program.

== Career ==
Valcq's professional career began as a boy soprano singing in Alban Berg's Wozzeck with the Skylight Comic Opera and Amahl and the Night Visitors with the Milwaukee Opera Company. For the Milwaukee Symphony Orchestra, he sang George Crumb's Ancient Voices of Children under conductor Arthur Weisberg and Kenneth Schermerhorn for Pro Musica Nova. He also played roles in summer stock, appearing with John Raitt, Karen Morrow, Margaret Whiting, and Dave Madden. Valcq had begun composing while still being in college and eventually abandoned performing to concentrate on composing and conducting. In addition to musicals, Valcq has composed song cycles and choral pieces which have been performed in the U.S. and Europe.

On Off-Broadway, Valcq wrote the book, music, and lyrics and co-directed the production for Zombies from The Beyond, which opened in 1995.

Valcq co-produced the 2001 Off-Broadway production of The Spitfire Grill for which he composed the score and collaborated on the book with lyricist Fred Alley. The musical won the Richard Rodgers Production Award presented by the American Academy of Arts and Letters. The Spitfire Grill also received Best Musical nominations from the Outer Critics Circle and Drama League, as well as two Drama Desk nominations. The cast album was released on Triangle Road Records.

Other New York credits include Fallout Follies at the York Theatre, Songs I Never Sang For My Father at the Village Theatre, and The Last Leaf, a collaboration with Mary Bracken Phillips. Regionally, Valcq composed an adaptation of the classic children's book The Pancake King commissioned by Milwaukee's Next Act Theatre, and The Passage (another collaboration with Fred Alley) at American Folklore Theatre in Wisconsin.

In addition to orchestrating his music, he has created orchestrations of classic musicals for regional theatres and opera companies. Valcq is also a conductor and musician, with Broadway credits including Chicago, Flower Drum Song, Scarlet Pimpernel, and Cabaret.

In 2007 Valcq returned to acting, playing Cosme McMoon in Souvenir at Boise Contemporary Theater, a role he has also played at American Stage Theatre and Stage Door Theatre Co. Additional credits include Feste in Twelfth Night and the Friar in Much Ado About Nothing at Door Shakespeare, Ernie in Guys on Ice at Milwaukee Repertory Theater, and Pierre in How I Became a Pirate at First Stage.

In October 2011, Valcq became co-Artistic Director of Third Avenue Playhouse in Sturgeon Bay, Wisconsin (with co-Artistic Director Robert Boles), where he's directed productions of The Glass Menagerie, Almost, Maine, and The 39 Steps.

Other compositions include the musicals Victory Farm (book and lyrics by Emilie Coulson & Katie Dahl) at American Folklore Theatre and Anatole (book and lyrics by Lee Becker & John Maclay), premiering at First Stage.

== Footnotes ==
1. The New York Times, July 28, 2002
2. The Wall Street Journal, October 3, 2001
3. The Chicago Tribune, November 22, 2002
4. Playbill September 2001, Volume 117, Number 9
5. Playwrights Horizons Mainstage Bulletin, Fall, 2001
6. The Milwaukee Journal-Sentinel, September 14, 2002
7. Ibid., November 21, 2006
