= Robert Neal Marshall =

American actor

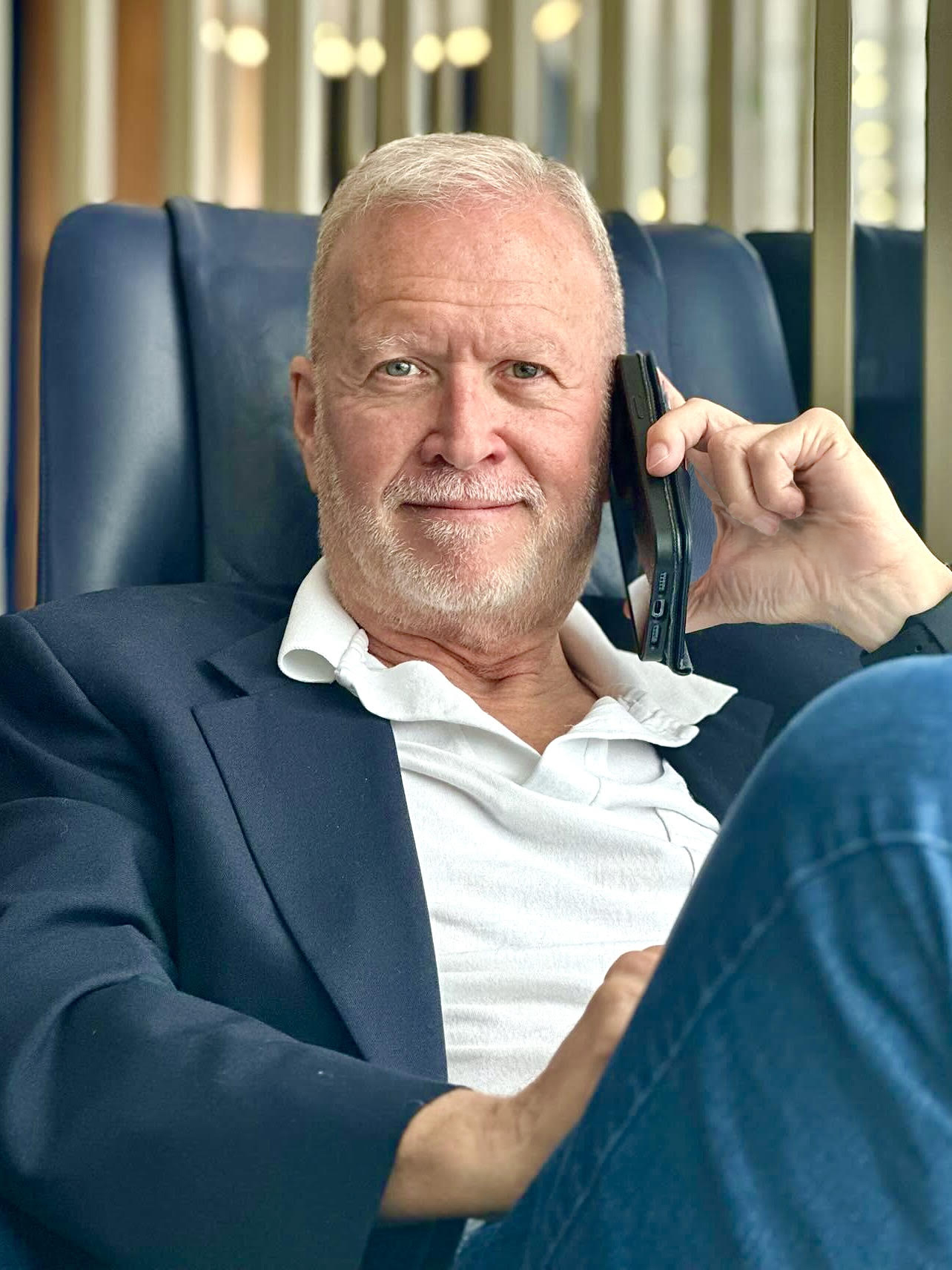
- Robert Neal Marshall
- Born: May 30, 1960 (age 66); Baltimore, Maryland, United States
- Occupations: Actor, filmmaker
- Years active: 1978–present

Robert Neal Marshall is an actor, director, producer and playwright who has worked on Off-Broadway, in Regional theater in the United States, on Broadway and in London's West End.

== Family ==
Marshall's mother is Broadway and television actress turned photographer Bette Marshall (née Lieb) and his adoptive father was Entertainment Law attorney Paul G. Marshall. Marshall's grandfather, Jack H. Lieb, was a newsreel cameraman known for his rare color films of the D-Day invasion onto the beaches of Normandy and the Liberation of Paris during World War II.

== Career ==
Marshall worked in London as an assistant to producer Richard Armitage on several shows including Me and My Girl with Robert Lindsay and Emma Thompson, High Society with Natasha Richardson, and Rowan Atkinson’s one man show A New Review. During this time, Marshall produced and directed the successful West End debut of Is There Life After High School? at the Donmar Warehouse and worked on the Broadway production of Me and My Girl.

As a member of the Lincoln Center Theater Directors' Lab, Marshall worked with composer Tim Battle from Boys Choir of Harlem. Together they adapted Diane Stanley's book Rumpelstiltskin's Daughter into a children’s musical that has been presented to in the Assembly Rooms at the Edinburgh Festival Fringe, at National Theatre's Saturday Morning Series, and for Richmond Virginia's Theatre IV.

Marshall frequently collaborates with Rain Pryor. He also produced a workshop production of After All, Tony Award-nominated actress Anita Gillette's one-woman show.

A member of Screen Actors Guild, AFTRA, and Actors' Equity, Marshall has appeared in major roles on several projects, including Captain Richard Phillips in Somali Pirate Takedown: The Real Story for Discovery Channel. Other leading roles include FDNY Captain Jay Jonas in the Emmy Award-nominated Countdown to Ground Zero for the History Channel and a recurring role as John Zaffis in A Haunting for the Discovery Channel. Stage work includes both the Off-Broadway and Baltimore Hippodrome productions of Ken Davenport's hit interactive comedy The Awesome 80s Prom as the overbearing Principal Snelgrove.

Marshall is a Guest Speaker on board the ocean liner RMS Queen Mary 2 as part of the Cunard Insights Enrichment Programme. His DVD documentary Three Queens: An International Rendezvous was released in November 2008 to coincide with the final journey of the Queen Elizabeth 2. His documentary Mr. Ocean Liner, about the life and times of maritime historian and author William H. Miller, had its world premiere aboard Queen Mary 2 on 1 July 2010.
