= Critics' Choice Movie Award for Best Actress =

Award given by the Broadcast Film Critics Association

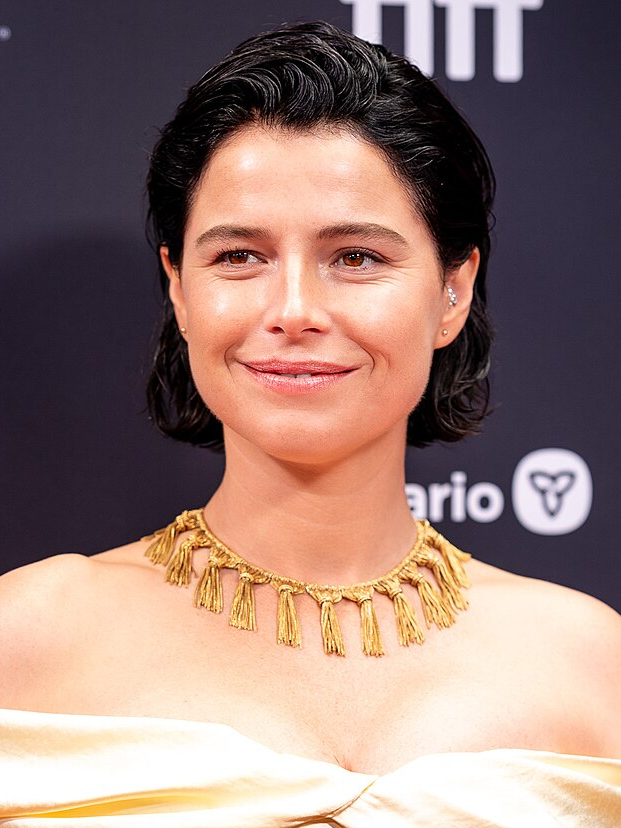
- The 2025 recipient: Jessie Buckley
- Awarded for: Best Performance by an Actress in a Leading Role
- Location: Los Angeles, California
- Presented by: Broadcast Film Critics Association
- Currently held by: Jessie Buckley for Hamnet (2025)
- Website: www.criticschoice.com

The Critics' Choice Movie Award for Best Actress is an award given out at the annual Critics' Choice Movie Awards. The awards are presented by the Critics Choice Association (CCA), and was first presented in 1995. There were no official nominees announced until 2001. As of 2026, there are currently six nominees annually, and there have been three ties in this category (2008, 2009, 2018). The record for most wins is three, held by Cate Blanchett, and six other actresses have won the award twice. 16 winners have gone on to also win the corresponding Academy Award, while Nicole Kidman's win for To Die For (1995) is the only to have not also received a nomination for the Academy Award.

This is the main Best Actress award for leading performances by an actress. Previously, two other genre-specific categories were presented: Best Actress in a Comedy (from 2012 to 2019); and Best Actress in an Action Movie (from 2012 to 2016).

For the Supporting Actress category, see Critics' Choice Movie Award for Best Supporting Actress.

== Winners and nominees ==
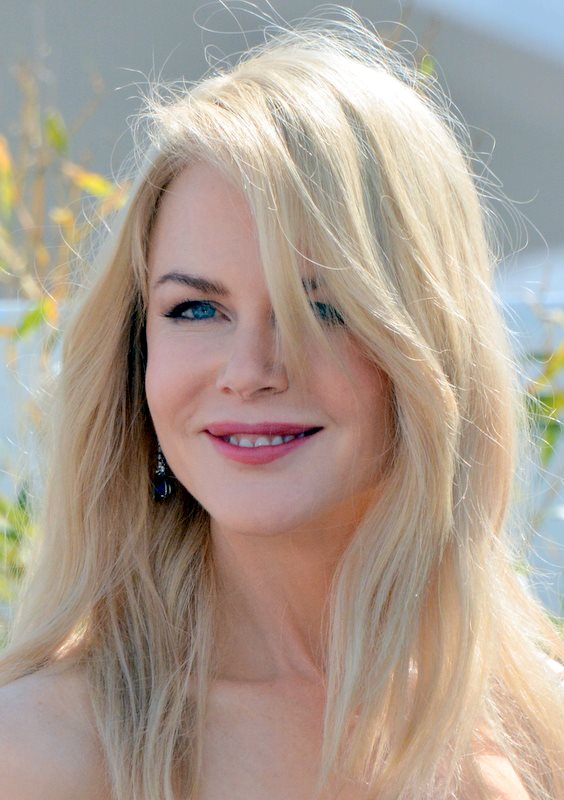
Nicole Kidman was the first recipient of this category in 1995

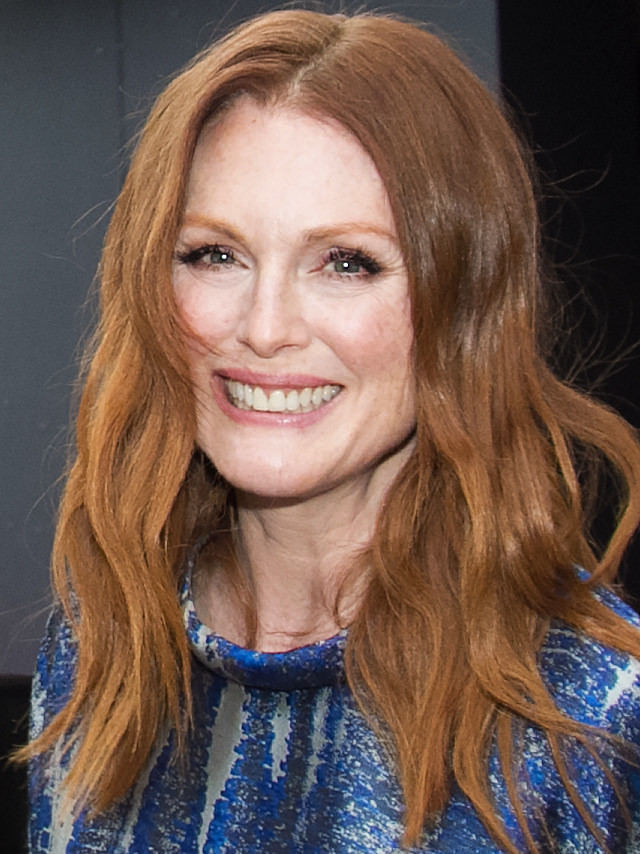
Julianne Moore won twice for Far from Heaven (2002) and Still Alice (2013)

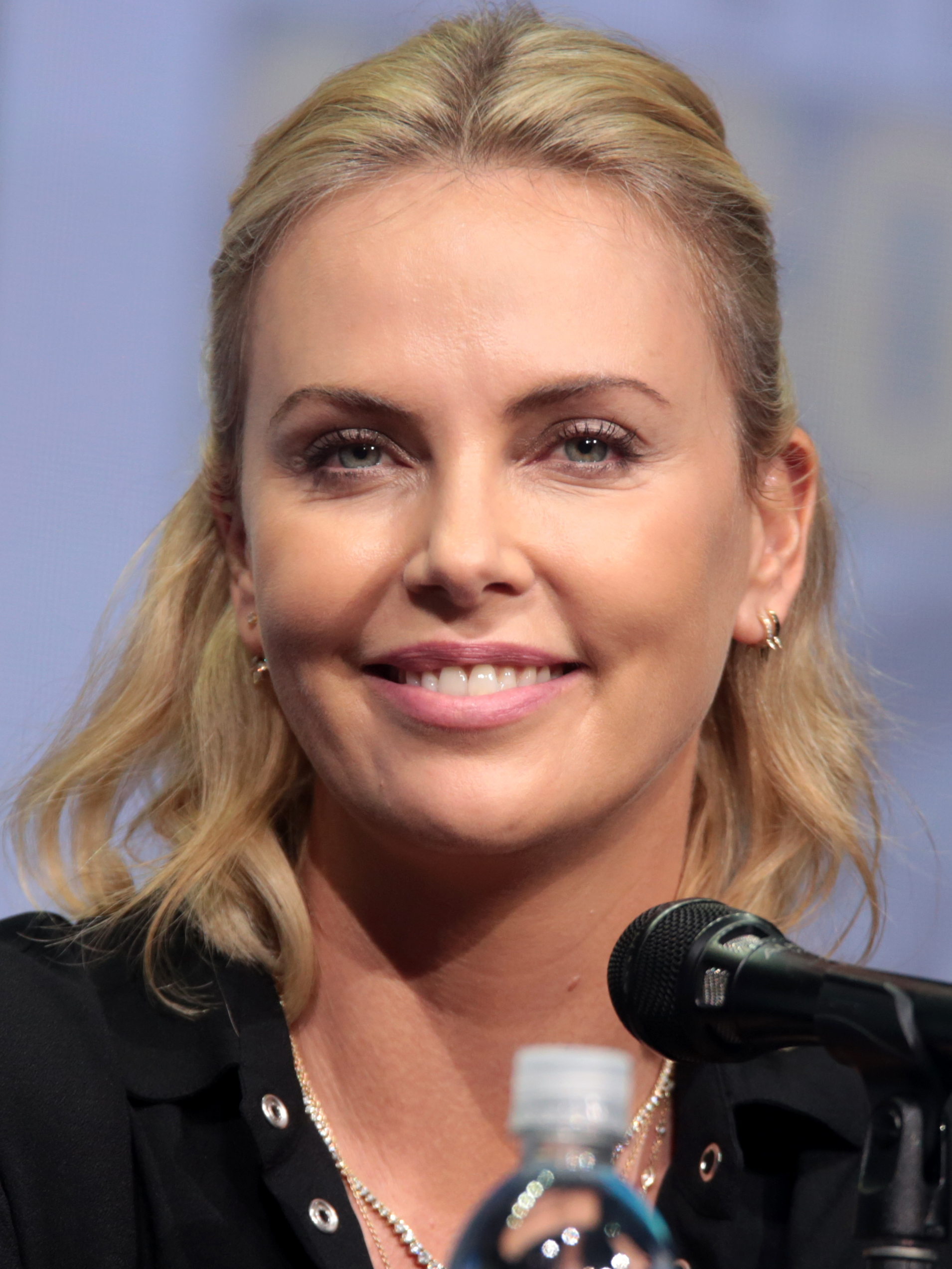
Charlize Theron won for Monster (2003)

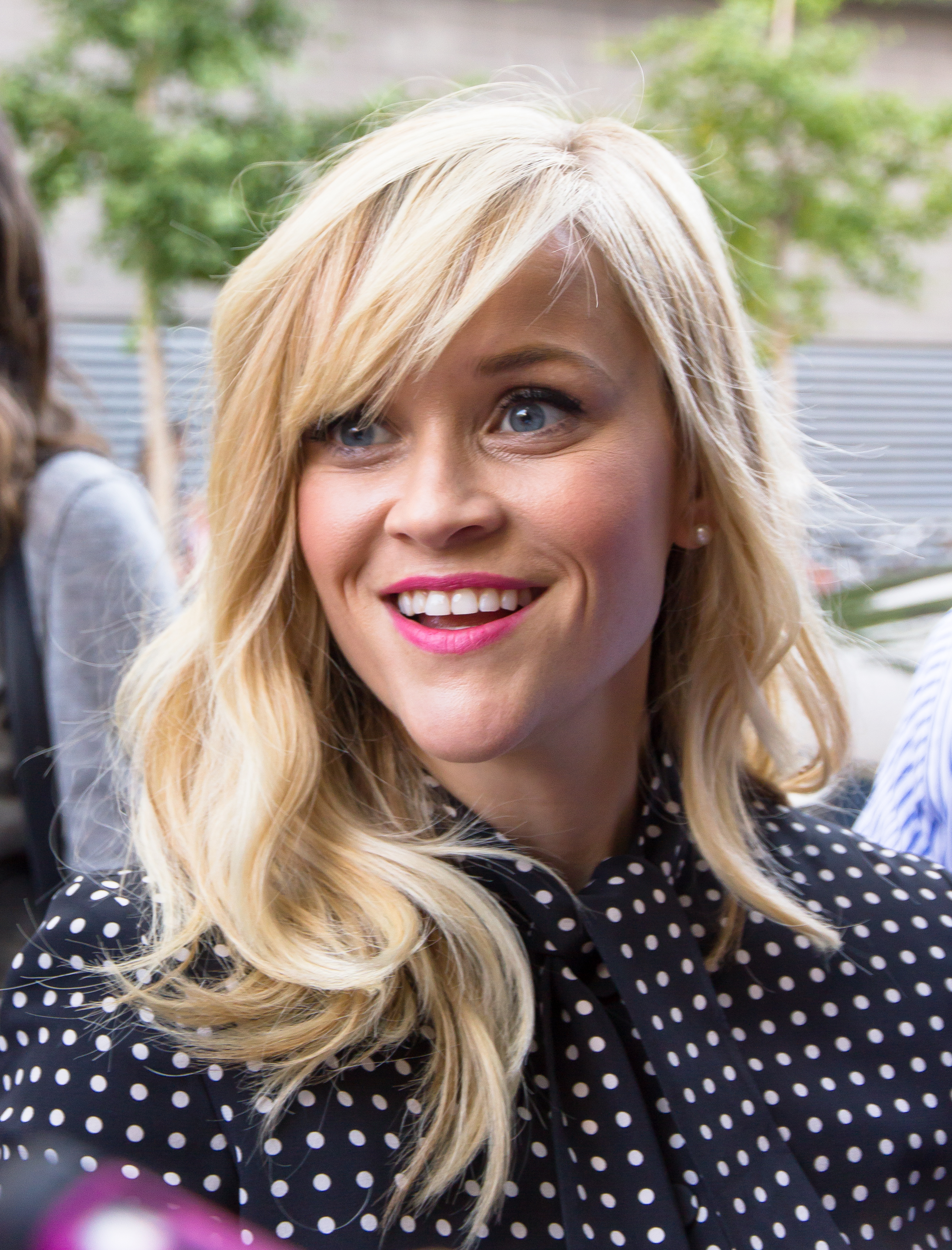
Reese Witherspoon won for Walk the Line (2005)

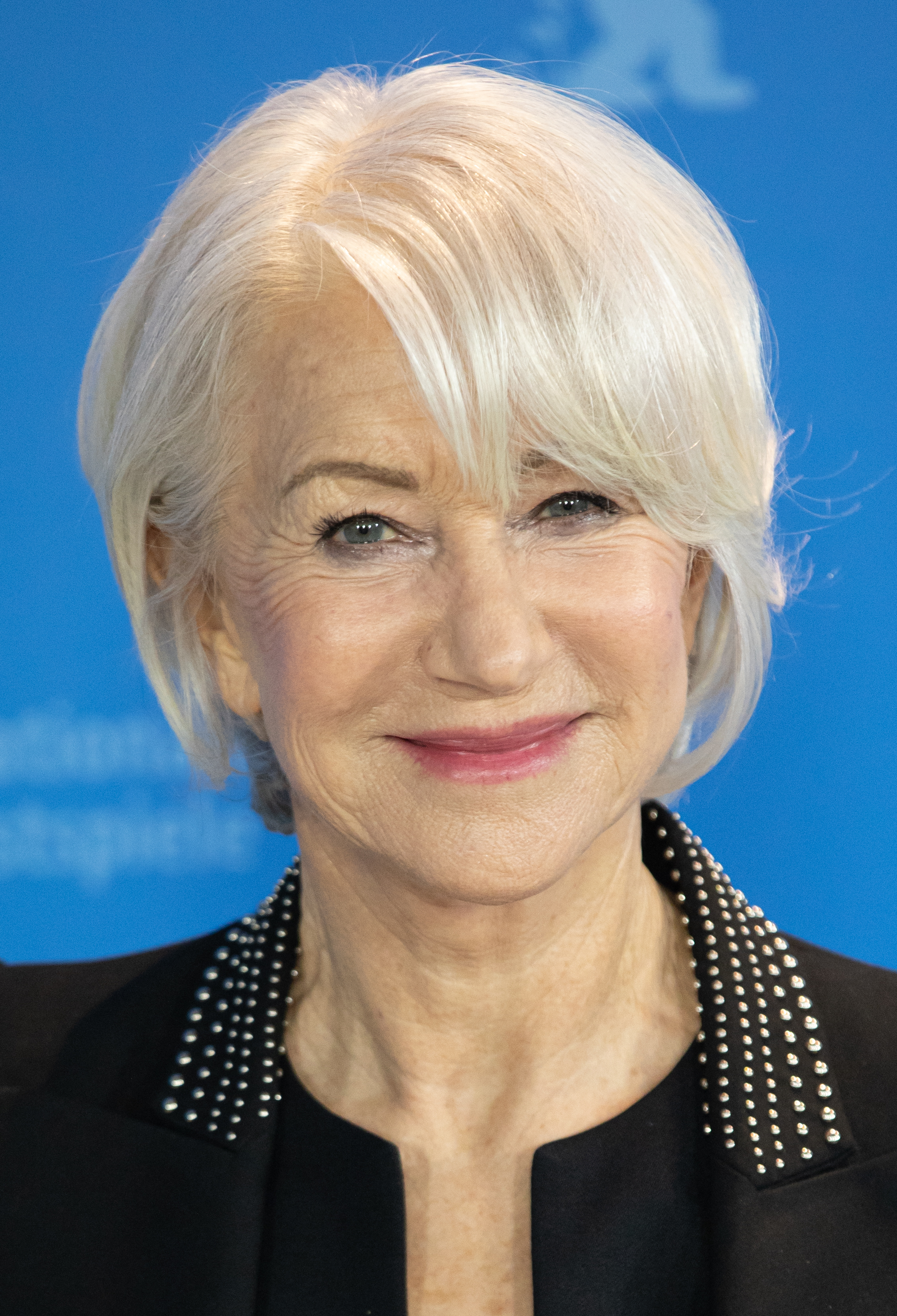
Dame Helen Mirren won for The Queen (2006)

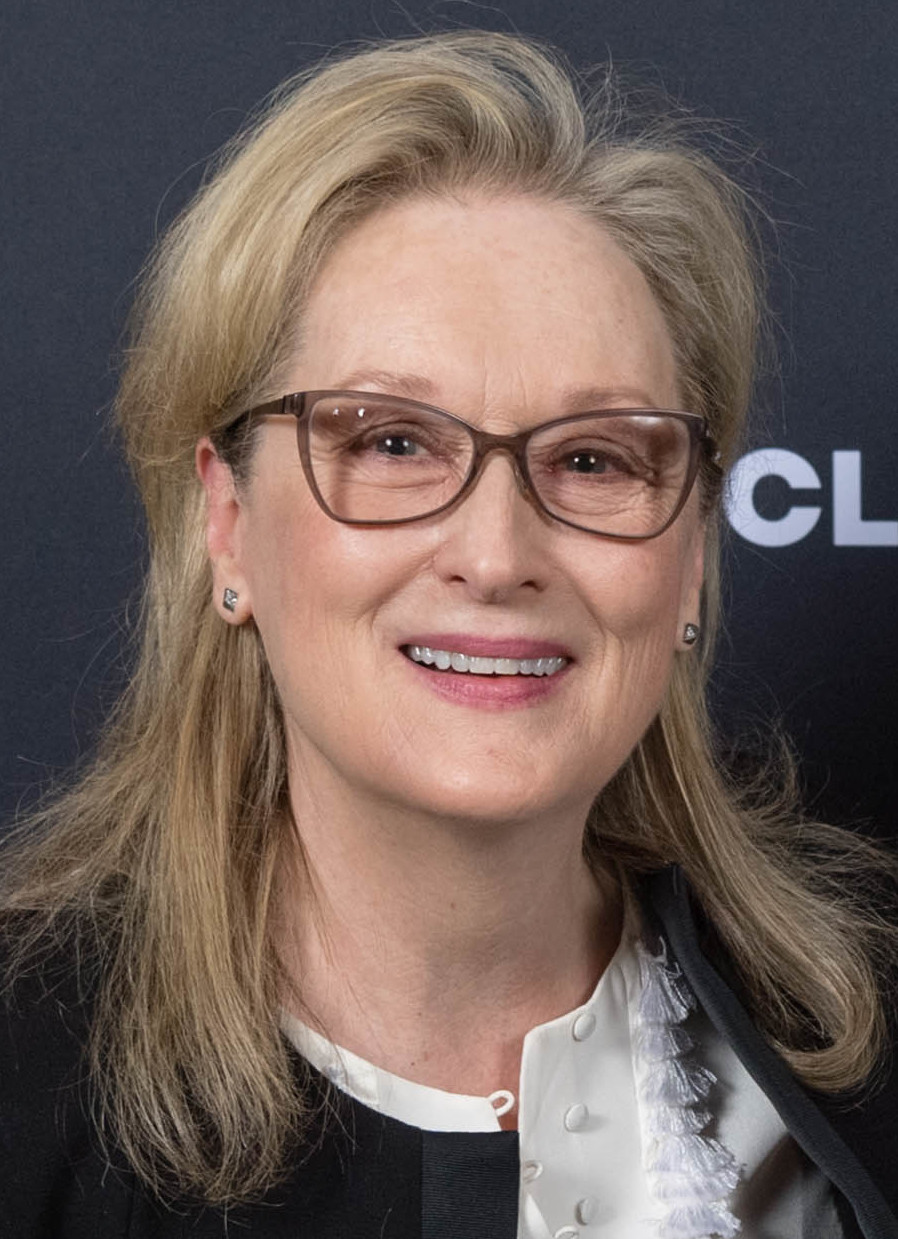
Meryl Streep won twice consecutively for Doubt (2008) and Julie & Julia (2009)

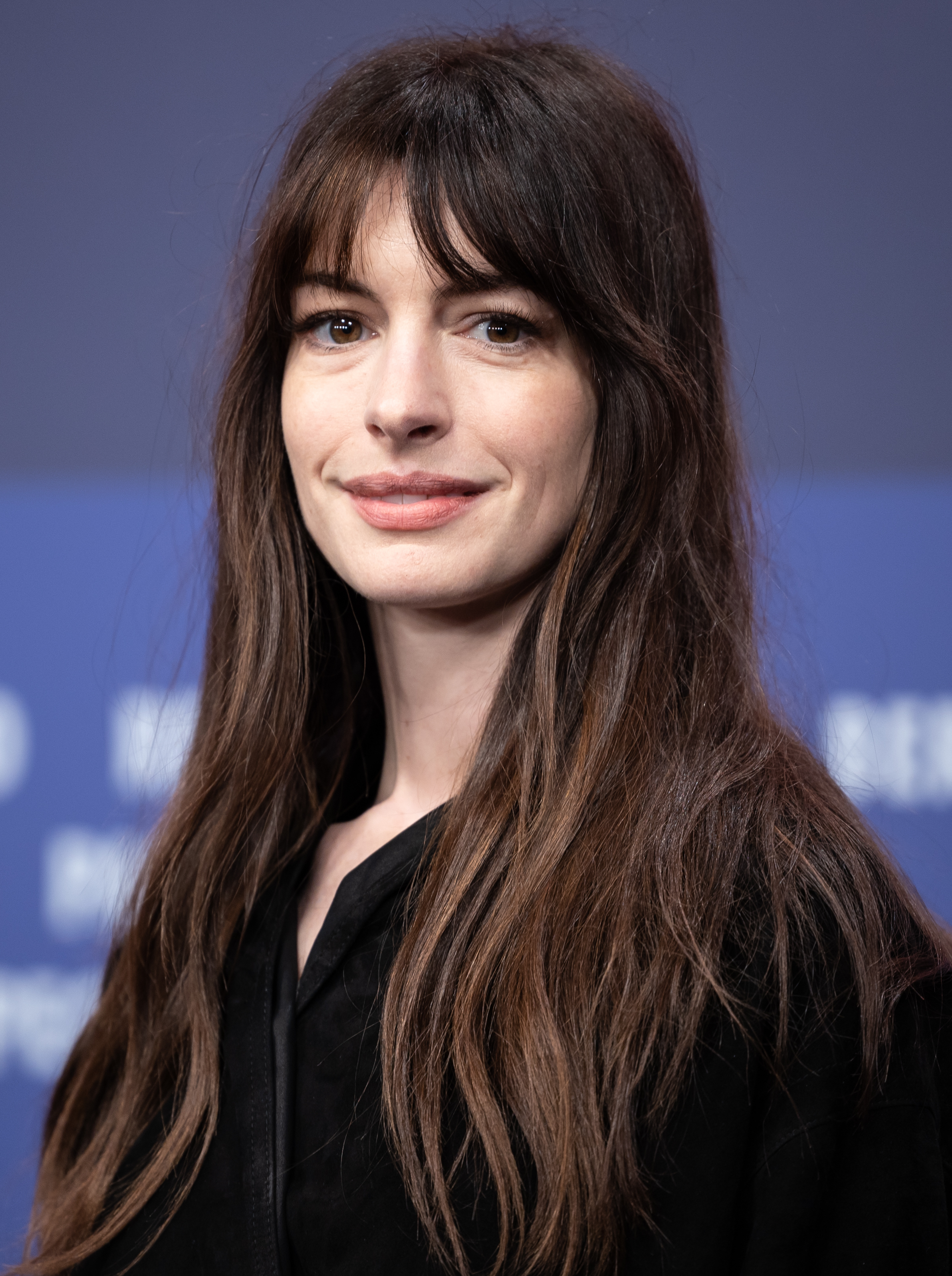
Anne Hathaway won for Rachel Getting Married (2008)

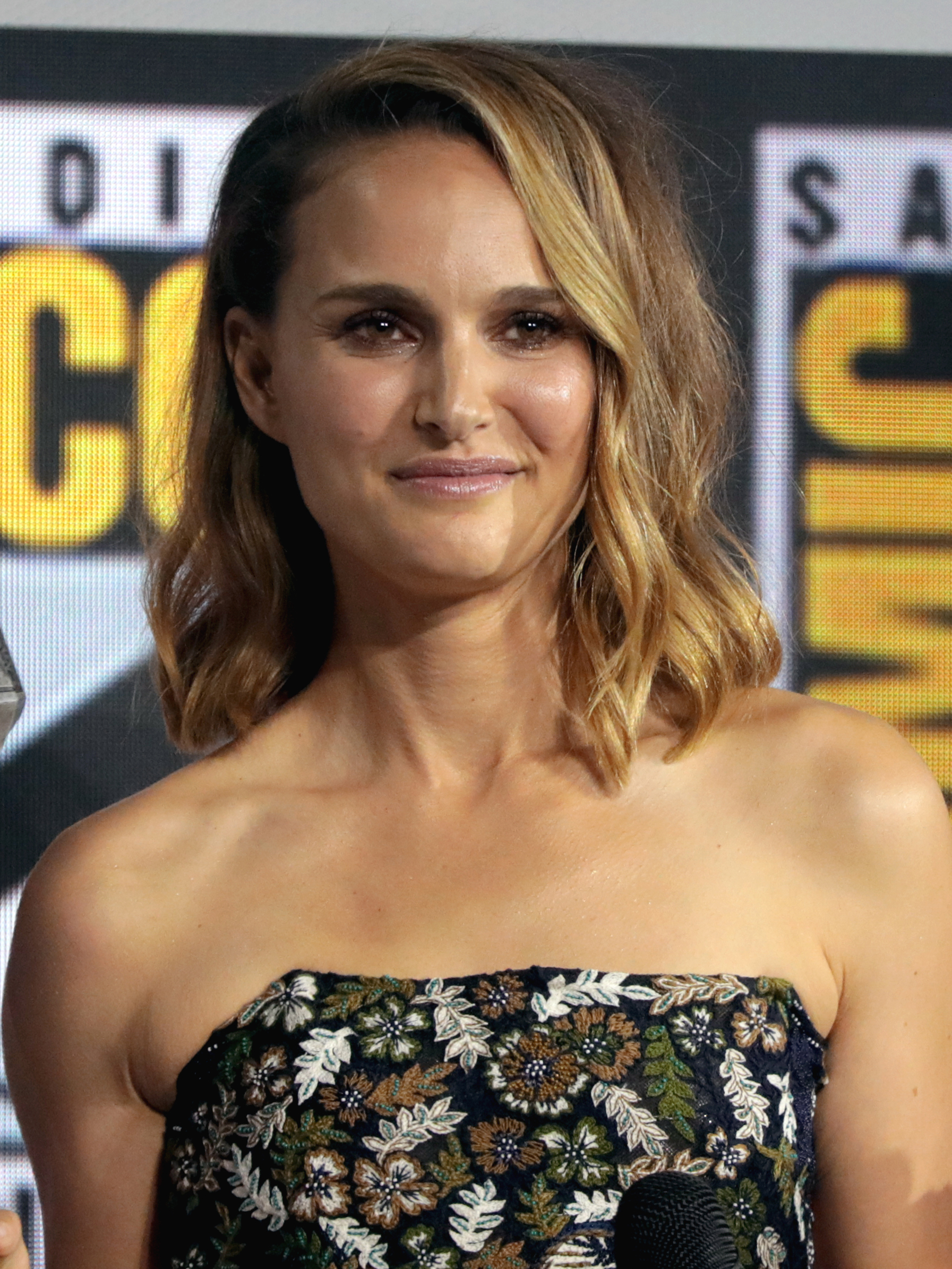
Natalie Portman won twice for Black Swan (2010) and Jackie (2016)

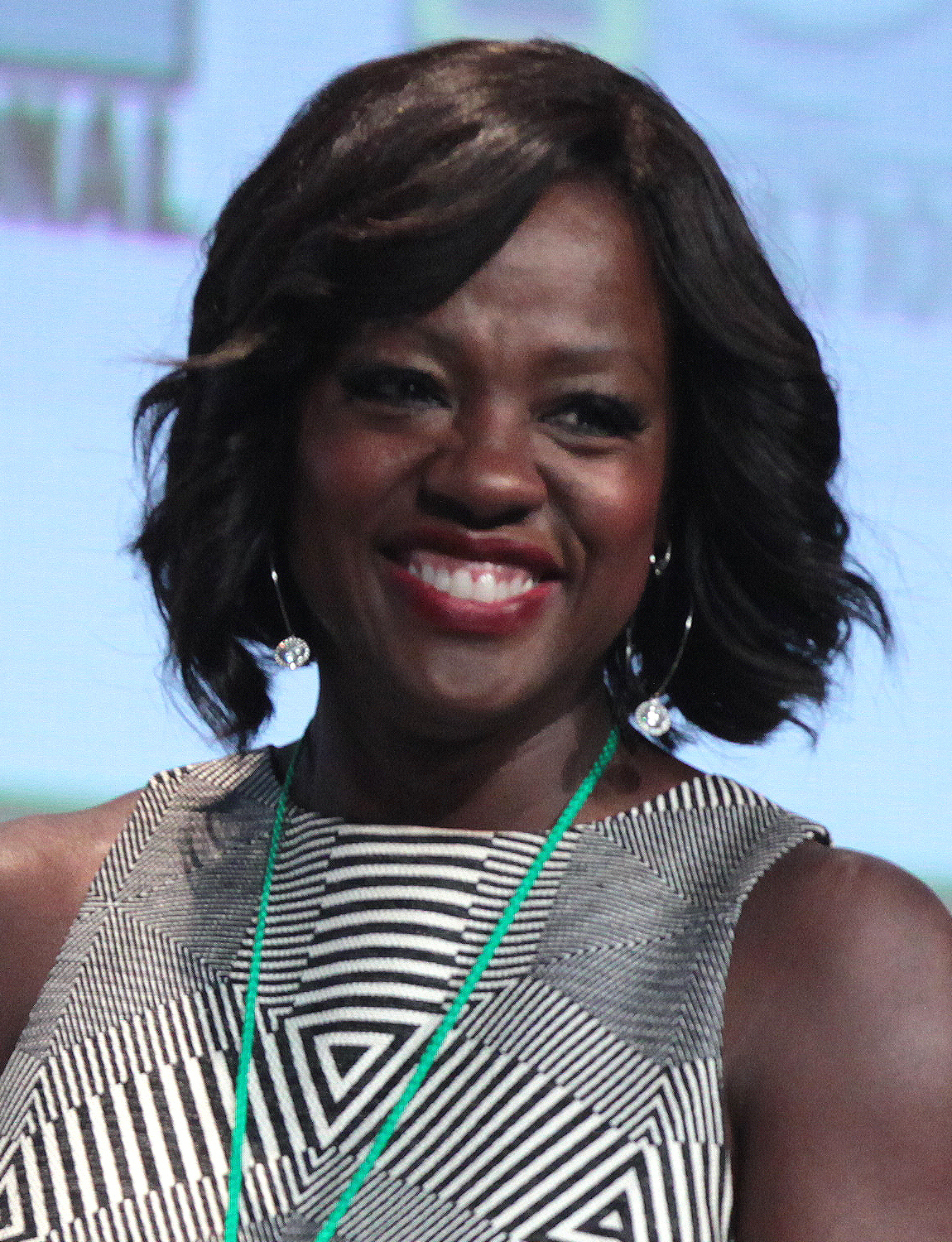
Viola Davis won for The Help (2011)

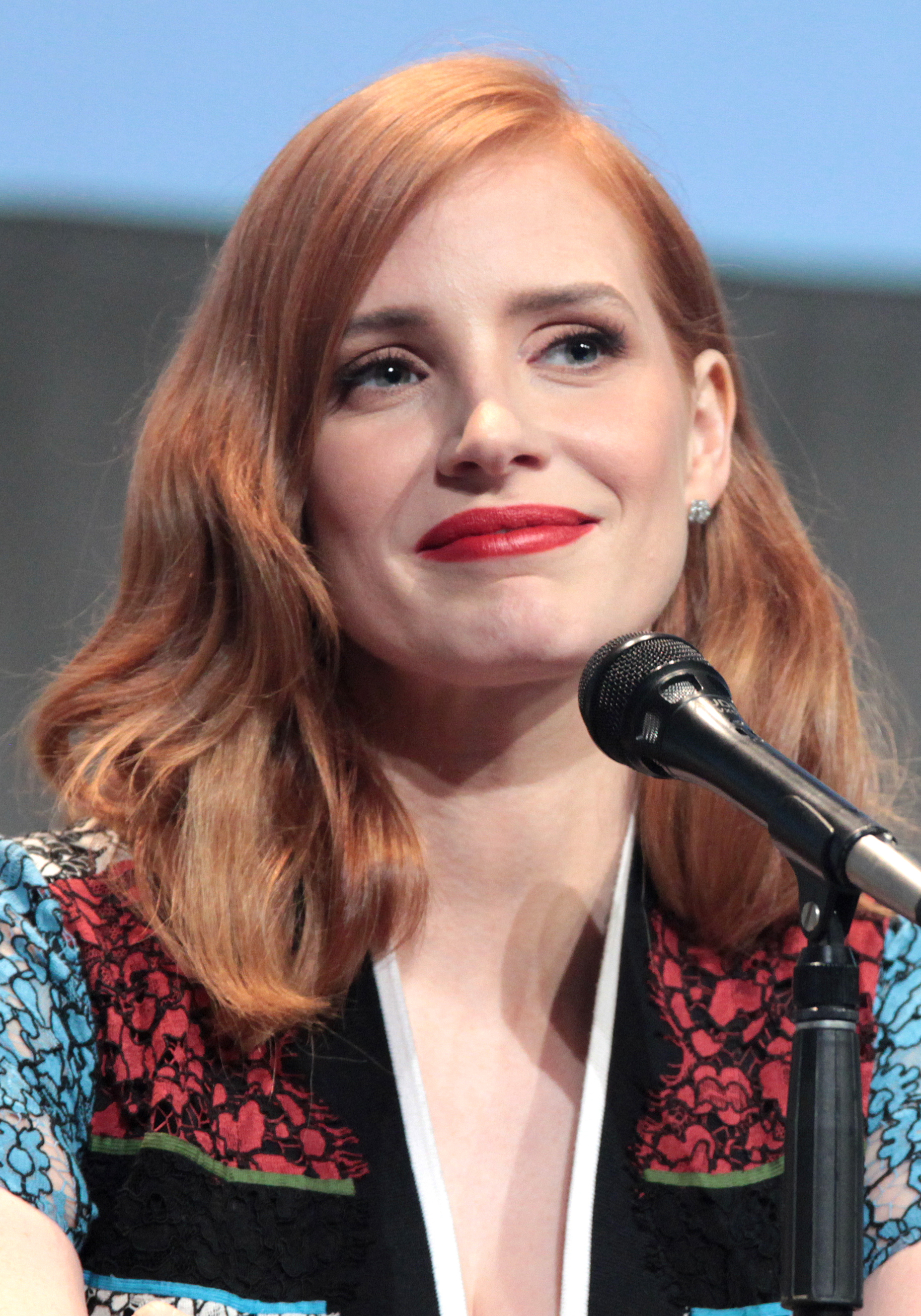
Jessica Chastain won twice for Zero Dark Thirty (2012) and The Eyes of Tammy Faye (2021)

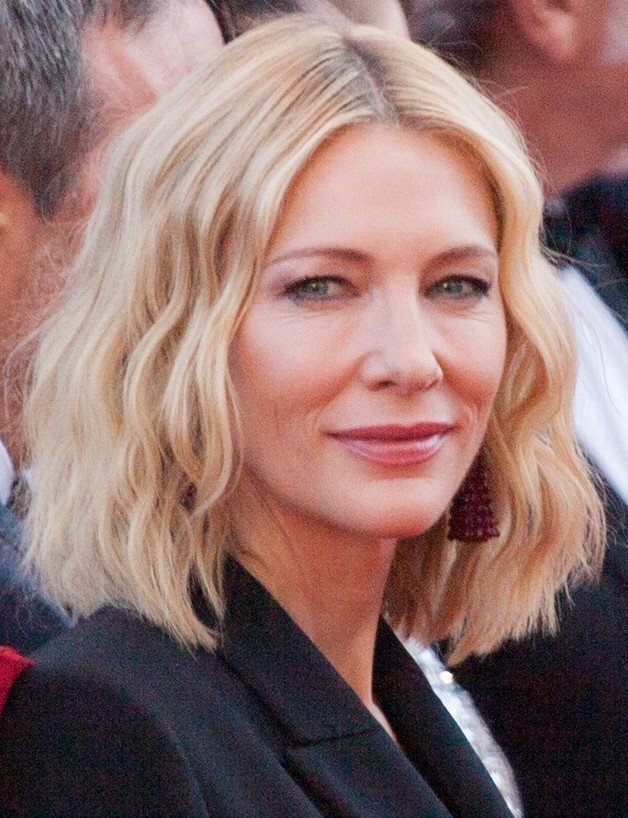
Cate Blanchett won thrice for Elizabeth (1998) Blue Jasmine (2013) and Tár (2022)

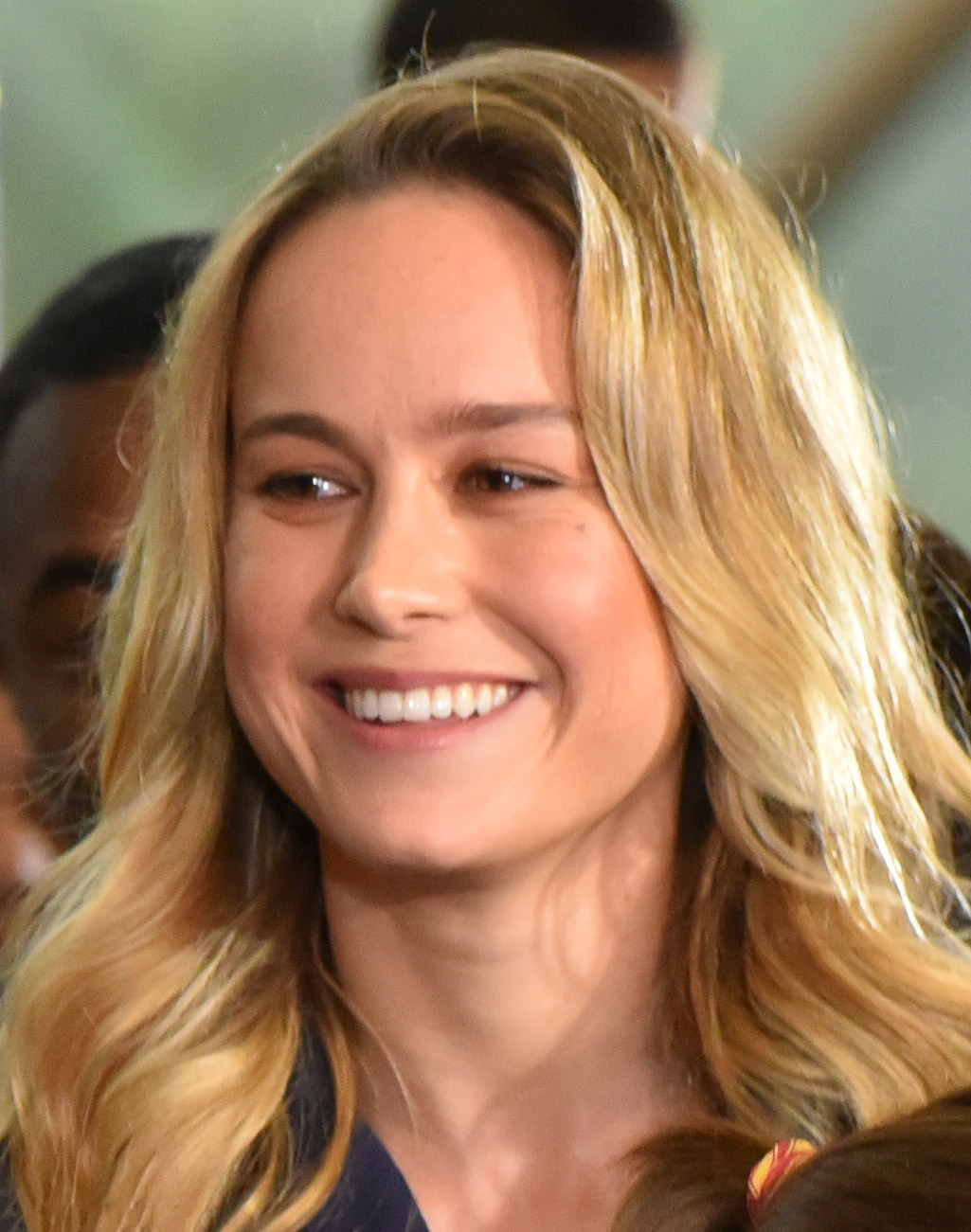
Brie Larson won for Room (2015)

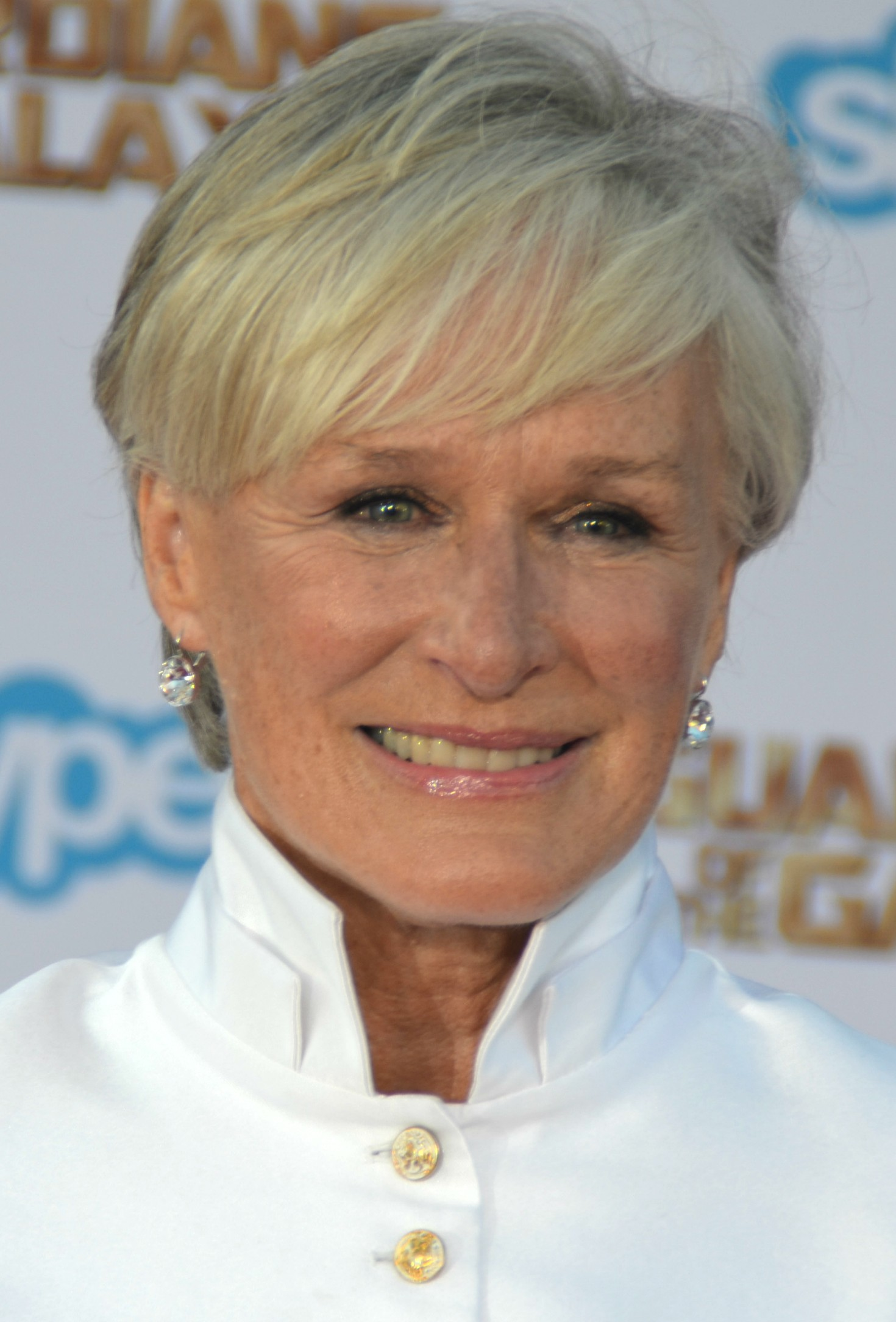
Glenn Close won for The Wife (2018)

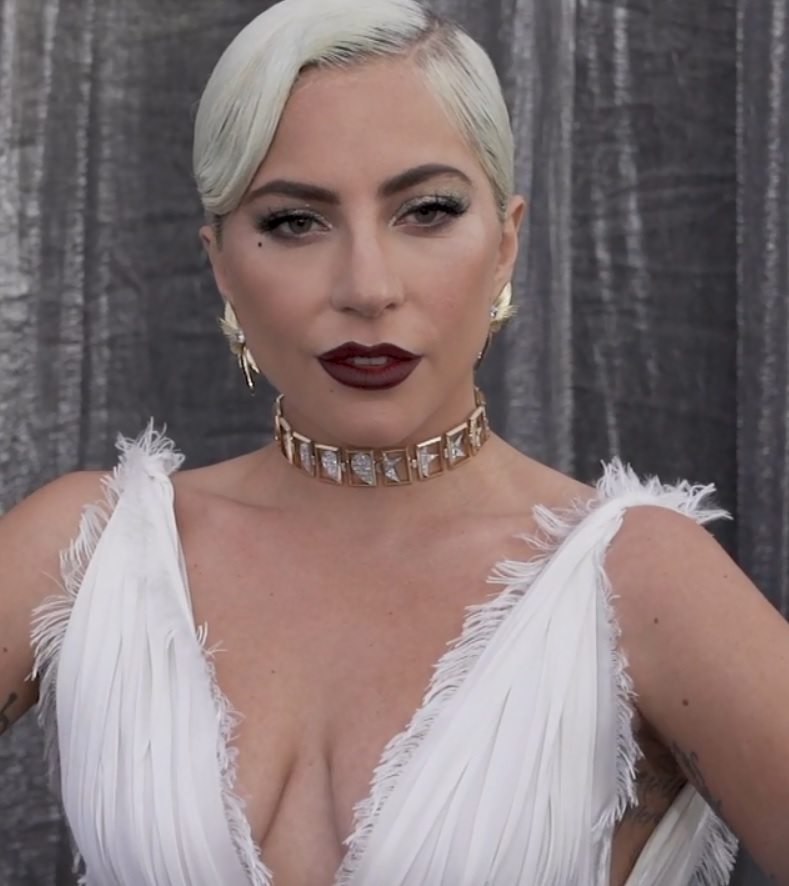
Lady Gaga won for A Star is Born (2018

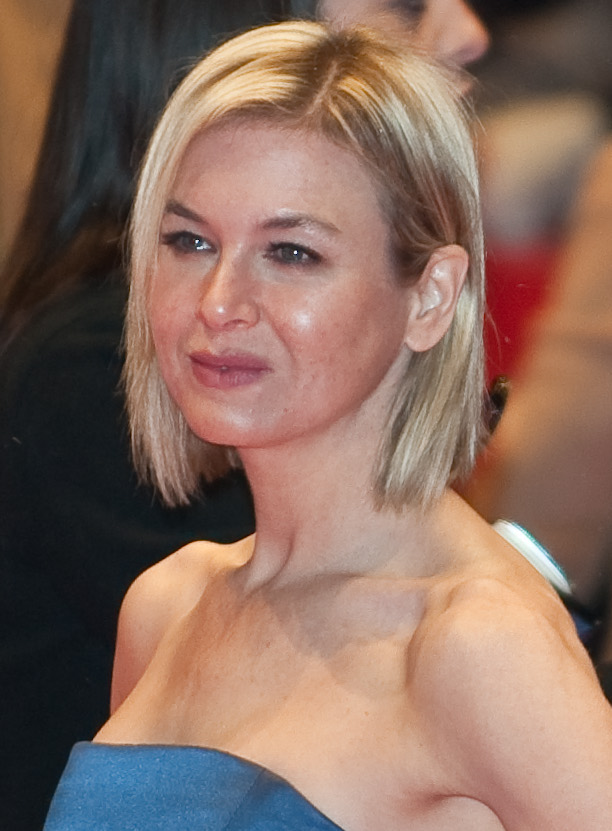
Renée Zellweger won for Judy (2019)

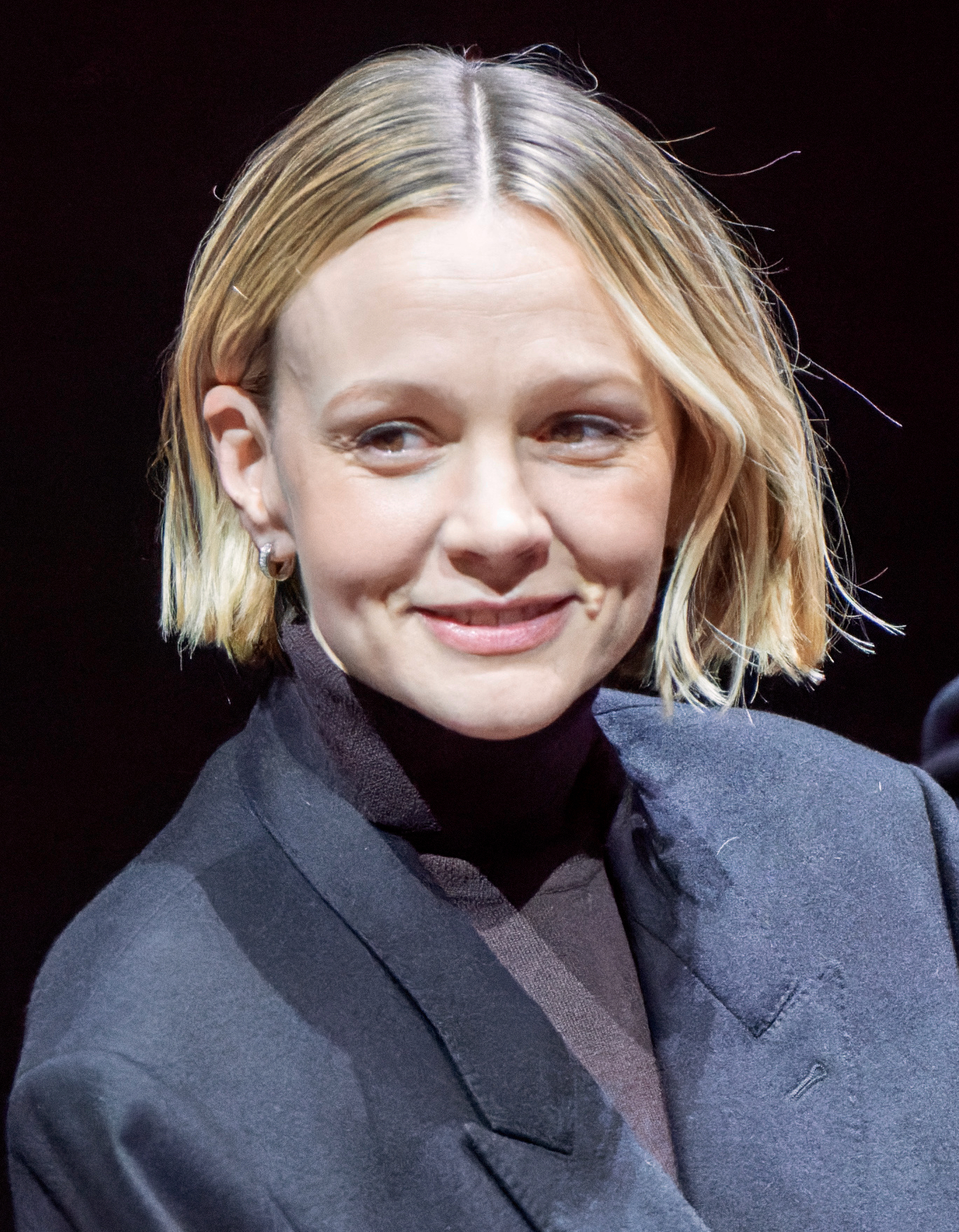
Carey Mulligan won for Promising Young Woman (2020)

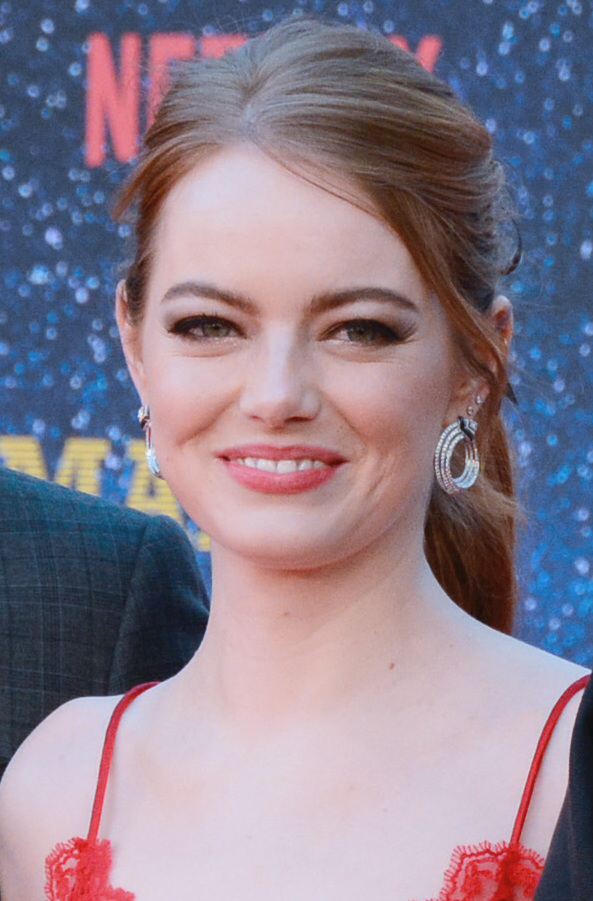
Emma Stone for Poor Things (2023)

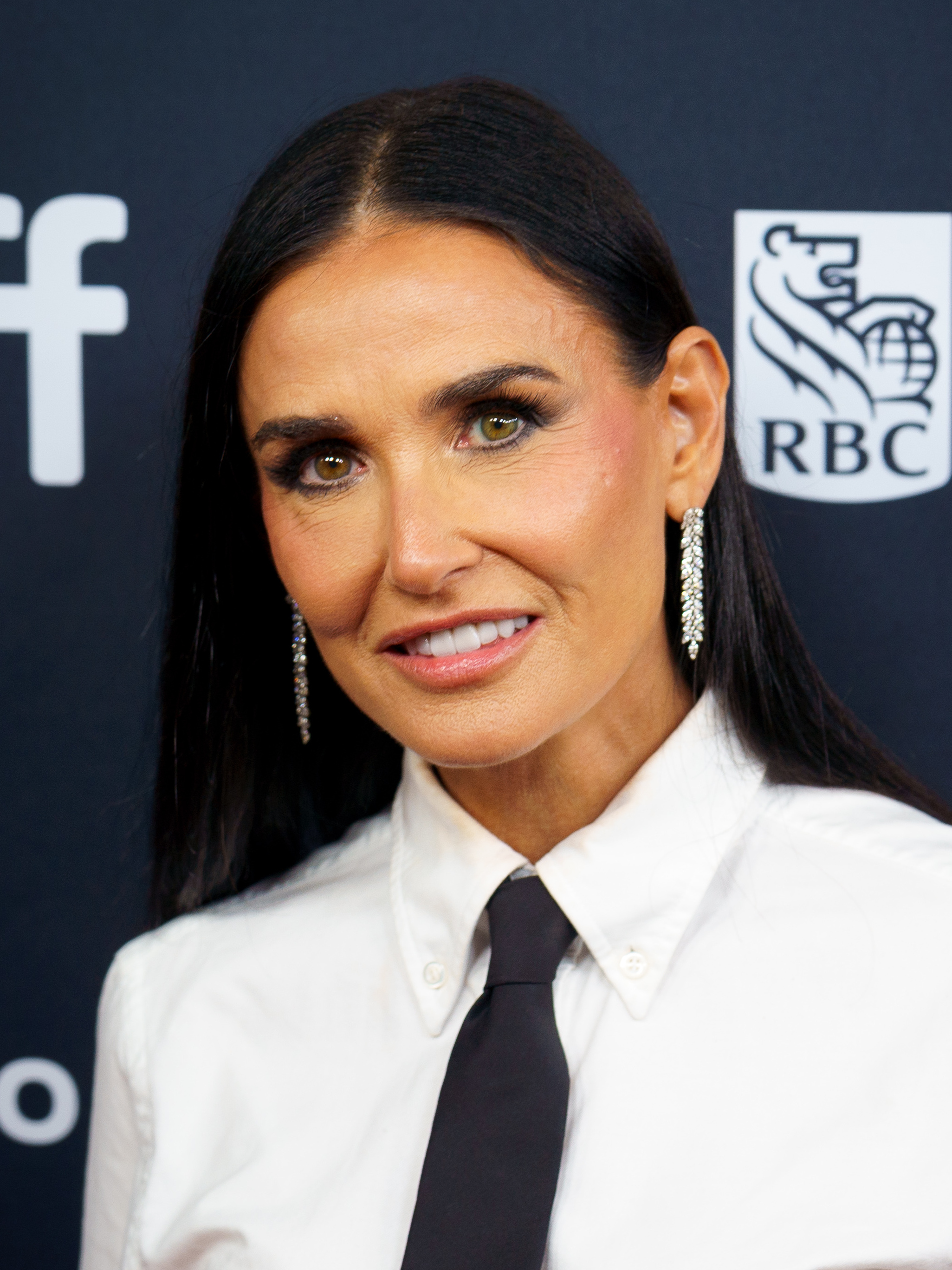
Demi Moore for The Substance (2024)

Table key
	Indicates the winner
†	Indicates a posthumous winner
†	Indicates an Academy Award nominee
‡	Indicates the Academy Award winner

=== 1990s ===
Year	Actress	Character	Work
1995	Nicole Kidman	Suzanne Stone-Maretto	To Die For
1996	Frances McDormand ‡	Marge Gunderson	Fargo
1997	Helena Bonham Carter †	Kate Croy	The Wings of the Dove
1998	Cate Blanchett †	Queen Elizabeth I	Elizabeth
1999	Hilary Swank ‡	Brandon Teena	Boys Don't Cry

=== 2000s ===
Year	Actress	Character	Work
2000	Julia Roberts ‡	Erin Brockovich	Erin Brockovich
2001	Sissy Spacek †	Ruth Fowler	In the Bedroom
2001	Nicole Kidman †	Satine	Moulin Rouge!
2001	Renée Zellweger †	Bridget Jones	Bridget Jones's Diary
2002	Julianne Moore †	Cathy Whitaker	Far from Heaven
2002	Salma Hayek †	Frida Kahlo	Frida
2002	Nicole Kidman ‡	Virginia Woolf	The Hours
2002	Diane Lane †	Constance "Connie" Sumner	Unfaithful
2003	Charlize Theron ‡	Aileen Wuornos	Monster
2003	Jennifer Connelly	Kathy Nicolo	House of Sand and Fog
2003	Diane Keaton †	Erica Barry	Something's Gotta Give
2003	Nicole Kidman	Ada Monroe	Cold Mountain
2003	Samantha Morton †	Sarah Sullivan	In America
2003	Naomi Watts †	Cristina "Cris" Peck	21 Grams
2004	Hilary Swank ‡	Margaret "Maggie" Fitzgerald	Million Dollar Baby
2004	Annette Bening †	Julia Lambert	Being Julia
2004	Catalina Sandino Moreno †	María Álvarez	Maria Full of Grace
2004	Imelda Staunton †	Vera Drake	Vera Drake
2004	Uma Thurman	Beatrix Kiddo	Kill Bill: Volume 2
2004	Kate Winslet †	Clementine Kruczynski	Eternal Sunshine of the Spotless Mind
2005	Reese Witherspoon ‡	June Carter Cash	Walk the Line
2005	Joan Allen	Terry Wolfmeyer	The Upside of Anger
2005	Judi Dench †	Laura Henderson	Mrs Henderson Presents
2005	Felicity Huffman †	Sabrina "Bree" Osbourne	Transamerica
2005	Keira Knightley †	Elizabeth Bennet	Pride & Prejudice
2005	Charlize Theron †	Josey Aimes	North Country
2006	Helen Mirren ‡	Queen Elizabeth II	The Queen
2006	Penélope Cruz †	Raimunda	Volver
2006	Judi Dench †	Barbara Covett	Notes on a Scandal
2006	Meryl Streep †	Miranda Priestly	The Devil Wears Prada
2006	Kate Winslet †	Sarah Pierce	Little Children
2007	Julie Christie †	Fiona Anderson	Away from Her
2007	Amy Adams	Princess Giselle	Enchanted
2007	Cate Blanchett †	Queen Elizabeth I	Elizabeth: The Golden Age
2007	Marion Cotillard ‡	Édith Piaf	La Vie en Rose
2007	Angelina Jolie	Mariane Pearl	A Mighty Heart
2007	Elliot Page †	Juno MacGuff	Juno
2008	Anne Hathaway † (TIE)	Kym Buchman	Rachel Getting Married
2008	Meryl Streep † (TIE)	Sister Aloysius Beauvier	Doubt
2008	Kate Beckinsale	Rachel Armstrong	Nothing but the Truth
2008	Cate Blanchett	Daisy Fuller (adult)	The Curious Case of Benjamin Button
2008	Angelina Jolie †	Christine Collins	Changeling
2008	Melissa Leo †	Ray Eddy	Frozen River
2009	Sandra Bullock ‡ (TIE)	Leigh Anne Tuohy	The Blind Side
2009	Meryl Streep † (TIE)	Julia Child	Julie & Julia
2009	Emily Blunt	Queen Victoria	The Young Victoria
2009	Carey Mulligan †	Jenny Miller	An Education
2009	Saoirse Ronan	Susie Salmon	The Lovely Bones
2009	Gabourey Sidibe †	Claireece "Precious" Jones	Precious

=== 2010s ===
Year	Actress	Character	Work
2010	Natalie Portman ‡	Nina Sayers	Black Swan
2010	Annette Bening †	Dr. Nicole "Nic" Allgood	The Kids Are All Right
2010	Nicole Kidman †	Becca Corbett	Rabbit Hole
2010	Jennifer Lawrence †	Ree Dolly	Winter's Bone
2010	Noomi Rapace	Lisbeth Salander	The Girl with the Dragon Tattoo
2010	Michelle Williams †	Cynthia "Cindy" Heller	Blue Valentine
2011	Viola Davis †	Aibileen Clark	The Help
2011	Elizabeth Olsen	Martha	Martha Marcy May Marlene
2011	Meryl Streep ‡	Margaret Thatcher	The Iron Lady
2011	Tilda Swinton	Eva Khatchadourian	We Need to Talk About Kevin
2011	Charlize Theron	Mavis Gary	Young Adult
2011	Michelle Williams †	Marilyn Monroe	My Week with Marilyn
2012	Jessica Chastain †	Maya Harris	Zero Dark Thirty
2012	Marion Cotillard	Stéphanie	Rust and Bone
2012	Jennifer Lawrence ‡	Tiffany Maxwell	Silver Linings Playbook
2012	Emmanuelle Riva †	Anne Laurent	Amour
2012	Quvenzhané Wallis †	Hushpuppy	Beasts of the Southern Wild
2012	Naomi Watts †	Maria Bennett	The Impossible
2013	Cate Blanchett ‡	Jeanette "Jasmine" Francis	Blue Jasmine
2013	Sandra Bullock †	Dr. Ryan Stone	Gravity
2013	Judi Dench †	Philomena Lee	Philomena
2013	Brie Larson	Grace Howard	Short Term 12
2013	Meryl Streep †	Violet Weston	August: Osage County
2013	Emma Thompson	P. L. Travers	Saving Mr. Banks
2014	Julianne Moore ‡	Dr. Alice Howland	Still Alice
2014	Jennifer Aniston	Claire Bennett	Cake
2014	Marion Cotillard †	Sandra Bya	Two Days, One Night
2014	Felicity Jones †	Jane Wilde Hawking	The Theory of Everything
2014	Rosamund Pike †	Amy Elliott-Dunne	Gone Girl
2014	Reese Witherspoon †	Cheryl Strayed	Wild
2015	Brie Larson ‡	Joy "Ma" Newsome	Room
2015	Cate Blanchett †	Carol Aird	Carol
2015	Jennifer Lawrence †	Joy Mangano	Joy
2015	Charlotte Rampling †	Kate Mercer	45 Years
2015	Saoirse Ronan †	Eilis Lacey	Brooklyn
2015	Charlize Theron	Imperator Furiosa	Mad Max: Fury Road
2016	Natalie Portman †	Jackie Kennedy	Jackie
2016	Amy Adams	Dr. Louise Banks	Arrival
2016	Annette Bening	Dorothea Fields	20th Century Women
2016	Isabelle Huppert †	Michèle Leblanc	Elle
2016	Ruth Negga †	Mildred Loving	Loving
2016	Emma Stone ‡	Mia Dolan	La La Land
2017	Frances McDormand ‡	Mildred Hayes	Three Billboards Outside Ebbing, Missouri
2017	Jessica Chastain	Molly Bloom	Molly's Game
2017	Sally Hawkins †	Elisa Esposito	The Shape of Water
2017	Margot Robbie †	Tonya Harding	I, Tonya
2017	Saoirse Ronan †	Christine "Lady Bird" McPherson	Lady Bird
2017	Meryl Streep †	Katharine Graham	The Post
2018	Glenn Close † (TIE)	Joan Castleman	The Wife
2018	Lady Gaga † (TIE)	Ally Maine	A Star Is Born
2018	Yalitza Aparicio †	Cleodegaria "Cleo" Gutiérrez	Roma
2018	Emily Blunt	Mary Poppins	Mary Poppins Returns
2018	Toni Collette	Annie Graham	Hereditary
2018	Olivia Colman ‡	Queen Anne	The Favourite
2018	Melissa McCarthy †	Lee Israel	Can You Ever Forgive Me?
2019	Renée Zellweger ‡	Judy Garland	Judy
2019	Awkwafina	Billi Wang	The Farewell
2019	Cynthia Erivo †	Harriet Tubman	Harriet
2019	Scarlett Johansson †	Nicole Barber	Marriage Story
2019	Lupita Nyong'o	Adelaide Wilson / Red	Us
2019	Saoirse Ronan †	Josephine "Jo" March	Little Women
2019	Charlize Theron †	Megyn Kelly	Bombshell

=== 2020s ===
Year	Actress	Character	Work
2020	Carey Mulligan †	Cassandra "Cassie" Thomas	Promising Young Woman
2020	Viola Davis †	Ma Rainey	Ma Rainey's Black Bottom
2020	Andra Day †	Billie Holiday	The United States vs. Billie Holiday
2020	Sidney Flanigan	Autumn Callahan	Never Rarely Sometimes Always
2020	Vanessa Kirby †	Martha Weiss	Pieces of a Woman
2020	Frances McDormand ‡	Fern	Nomadland
2020	Zendaya	Marie Jones	Malcolm & Marie
2021	Jessica Chastain ‡	Tammy Faye Bakker	The Eyes of Tammy Faye
2021	Olivia Colman †	Leda Caruso	The Lost Daughter
2021	Alana Haim	Alana Kane	Licorice Pizza
2021	Nicole Kidman †	Lucille Ball	Being the Ricardos
2021	Lady Gaga	Patrizia Reggiani	House of Gucci
2021	Kristen Stewart †	Princess Diana	Spencer
2022	Cate Blanchett †	Lydia Tár	Tár
2022	Viola Davis	General Nanisca	The Woman King
2022	Danielle Deadwyler	Mamie Till	Till
2022	Margot Robbie	Nellie LaRoy	Babylon
2022	Michelle Williams †	Mitzi Fabelman	The Fabelmans
2022	Michelle Yeoh ‡	Evelyn Wang	Everything Everywhere All at Once
2023	Emma Stone ‡	Bella Baxter	Poor Things
2023	Lily Gladstone †	Mollie Kyle	Killers of the Flower Moon
2023	Sandra Hüller †	Sandra Voyter	Anatomy of a Fall
2023	Greta Lee	Nora Moon	Past Lives
2023	Carey Mulligan †	Felicia Montealegre Bernstein	Maestro
2023	Margot Robbie	Barbie	Barbie
2024	Demi Moore †	Elisabeth Sparkle	The Substance
2024	Cynthia Erivo †	Elphaba Thropp	Wicked
2024	Karla Sofía Gascón †	Emilia Pérez	Emilia Pérez
2024	Marianne Jean-Baptiste	Pansy Deacon	Hard Truths
2024	Angelina Jolie	Maria Callas	Maria
2024	Mikey Madison ‡	Anora "Ani" Mikheeva	Anora
2025	Jessie Buckley ‡	Agnes Shakespeare	Hamnet
2025	Rose Byrne †	Linda	If I Had Legs I'd Kick You
2025	Chase Infiniti	Willa Ferguson	One Battle After Another
2025	Renate Reinsve †	Nora Borg	Sentimental Value
2025	Amanda Seyfried	Ann Lee	The Testament of Ann Lee
2025	Emma Stone †	Michelle Fuller	Bugonia

== Multiple nominees ==
6 nominations

- Cate Blanchett
- Nicole Kidman
- Meryl Streep

5 nominations

- Charlize Theron

4 nominations

- Saoirse Ronan

3 nominations

- Annette Bening
- Jessica Chastain
- Marion Cotillard
- Viola Davis
- Judi Dench
- Angelina Jolie
- Jennifer Lawrence
- Frances McDormand
- Carey Mulligan
- Margot Robbie
- Emma Stone
- Michelle Williams

2 nominations

- Amy Adams
- Emily Blunt
- Sandra Bullock
- Olivia Colman
- Cynthia Erivo
- Lady Gaga
- Brie Larson
- Julianne Moore
- Natalie Portman
- Hilary Swank
- Naomi Watts
- Kate Winslet
- Reese Witherspoon
- Renée Zellweger

== Multiple winners ==
3 wins

- Cate Blanchett

2 wins

- Jessica Chastain
- Frances McDormand
- Julianne Moore
- Natalie Portman
- Meryl Streep (consecutive)
- Hilary Swank

== See also ==
- Academy Award for Best Actress
- Independent Spirit Award for Best Female Lead
- BAFTA Award for Best Actress in a Leading Role
- Golden Globe Award for Best Actress in a Motion Picture – Drama
- Golden Globe Award for Best Actress – Motion Picture Comedy or Musical
- Screen Actors Guild Award for Outstanding Performance by a Female Actor in a Leading Role
