= Joy (2015 film) =

2015 film by David O. Russell

- Theatrical release poster
- Directed by: David O. Russell
- Screenplay by: David O. Russell
- Story by: Annie Mumolo; David O. Russell
- Produced by: John Davis; Megan Ellison; Jonathan Gordon; Ken Mok; David O. Russell
- Starring: Jennifer Lawrence; Robert De Niro; Édgar Ramírez; Diane Ladd; Virginia Madsen; Isabella Rossellini; Bradley Cooper
- Cinematography: Linus Sandgren
- Edited by: Alan Baumgarten; Jay Cassidy; Tom Cross; Christopher Tellefsen
- Music by: West Dylan Thordson; David Campbell
- Production companies: Fox 2000 Pictures; Davis Entertainment Company; Annapurna Pictures
- Distributed by: 20th Century Fox
- Release dates: December 13, 2015 (New York City); December 25, 2015 (United States)
- Running time: 124 minutes
- Country: United States
- Language: English
- Budget: $60 million
- Box office: $101.1 million

Joy is a 2015 American biographical drama film written and directed by David O. Russell and starring Jennifer Lawrence as Joy Mangano, a self-made millionaire who created a business empire.

Joy received a theatrical release on December 25, 2015, by 20th Century Fox. The film grossed $101.1 million worldwide, and received mixed reviews from critics, with praise for Lawrence's performance, but criticism for Russell’s direction and writing and the pacing of the film.

Joy earned Lawrence the Golden Globe Award for Best Actress – Motion Picture Comedy or Musical, in addition to nominations for the Critics' Choice Movie Award for Best Actress and the Academy Award for Best Actress, the latter making Lawrence the youngest person in history to receive four Academy Award nominations. The film also received a nomination for the Golden Globe Award for Best Motion Picture – Musical or Comedy.

== Plot ==
In 1990, Joy Mangano, an airline booking agent residing in Peconic, New York, struggles financially while juggling a complicated family life. Living with Joy are her two children and her single mother Terri, who spends all day in bed watching soap operas, her maternal grandmother Mimi, and her under-employed ex-husband Tony, a wannabe singer who sleeps in the basement.

Joy's overachieving paternal half-sister Peggy constantly humiliates her in front of her children for her failed marriage. Joy's father Rudy further complicates matters when he also moves into the basement after his third divorce.

Mimi and Joy's best friend Jackie encourage Joy to pursue her inventing ambitions. Frustrated when using a conventional mop, she designs and builds an innovative self-wringing type. Trudy, a wealthy Italian widow Rudy is dating, agrees to invest in Joy's product. They contract a California company to manufacture the mop's parts at a low price.

To avoid a potential patent lawsuit, the company advises Joy to pay $50,000 in royalties to a man in Hong Kong who has a similar product. When the manufacturer repeatedly bills Joy to remake their faulty parts, she refuses to pay.

Joy meets QVC executive Neil Walker, who agrees to sell her mops on TV. To manufacture 50,000 additional units, she takes out a second home mortgage. When the first TV attempt fails after the celebrity pitchman improperly demonstrates the product, Joy demands she be allowed to do a second infomercial. The mop sells out, earning thousands of dollars; her success is soon tempered by Mimi's sudden death.

Joy's fledgling business is financially jeopardized after Peggy pays the manufacturer's excessive overcharges without Joy's approval. The manufacturer refuses to refund the money, and a contract loophole allows them to fraudulently patent Joy's mop design as their own.

Shortly after filing for bankruptcy, Joy discovers there was never a similar product in Hong Kong, and the manufacturer has defrauded her. She confronts owner Derek Markham, forcing him to refund the overcharges, pay damages, and relinquish any claim to her patent or face criminal charges.

Joy becomes a successful independent businesswoman who sponsors other inventors. Jackie and Tony are her most valued advisers. Joy supports her aging father, despite his and Peggy's unsuccessful lawsuit for ownership of her company. Only Terri is independent, having found stability with Toussaint, a Haitian plumber Joy once hired. As Neil predicted, he and Joy became "adversaries in commerce" with her move to HSN, but they remain personal friends.

== Cast ==
- Jennifer Lawrence as Joy Mangano, the inventor of the Miracle Mop
  - Isabella Crovetti-Cramp as young Joy Mangano
- Robert De Niro as Rudy Mangano, Joy's father
- Bradley Cooper as Neil Walker, an executive at QVC
- Édgar Ramírez as Tony Miranda, Joy's ex-husband
- Diane Ladd as Mimi, Joy's grandmother
- Virginia Madsen as Terri Mangano, Joy's mother
- Dascha Polanco as Jackie, Joy's best friend
  - Emily Nunez as young Jackie
- Elisabeth Röhm as Peggy Mangano, Joy's paternal half-sister
  - Madison Wolfe as young Peggy Mangano
- Isabella Rossellini as Trudy, Rudy's girlfriend
- Melissa Rivers as Joan Rivers
- Donna Mills as Priscilla
- Susan Lucci as Danica
- Maurice Benard as Jared
- Laura Wright as Clarinda
- Jimmy Jean-Louis as Toussaint
- Drena De Niro as Cindy
- Ken Cheeseman as Gerhardt

== Production ==
=== Writing and casting ===
In January 2014, it was announced that David O. Russell's upcoming project would entail rewriting and directing a drama film about American inventor and entrepreneur Joy Mangano, a struggling Long Island single mom of three children. Russell signed Jennifer Lawrence to play the lead role in the film, which John Davis and John Fox produced for Davis Entertainment, along with Ken Mok, with 20th Century Fox holding the distribution rights.

In early November 2014, Russell said it was "a great opportunity to do something neither Jennifer nor I have done [before]". He also stated he would like to cast Robert De Niro and create a role for Bradley Cooper to star in the film. On November 11, it was reported that De Niro was in final talks to re-team with Russell and Lawrence in the film, to play Mangano's father. They worked together in the 2012 film Silver Linings Playbook, and De Niro made a cameo in 2013's American Hustle.

Russell rewrote the script by Annie Mumolo. On November 17, De Niro confirmed his casting, saying, "Yes I am going to do something with them. I am going to play a father."

In early December 2014, Cooper was officially set to star along with Lawrence, playing an executive at QVC who helps Joy by giving the Miracle Mop a boost. On December 8, Édgar Ramírez was cast as Tony Miranda, Joy's now ex-husband. Additional cast members, including Isabella Rossellini, Diane Ladd and Virginia Madsen in unspecified roles, were revealed on February 17, 2015. Isabella Crovetti-Cramp played young Joy. In February, another working title was revealed, which was Kay's Baptism. Elisabeth Röhm's casting as Peggy, sister of Joy Mangano, was revealed on February 27, 2015.

=== Filming ===
Principal photography began in February 2015, after De Niro completed the shooting of Dirty Grandpa. Filming was originally set to begin on February 9, 2015, in Boston, Massachusetts, making this Russell's third film shot in the area. Due to snow in the city, filming was rescheduled to begin on February 19, on Federal Street in Wilmington, Massachusetts, lasting through February 26, but principal photography on the film began in Boston on February 16, 2015.

In Wilmington, filming lasted until February 26, 2015. On February 27, 2015, Lawrence made a Facebook post denying the rumors about her clashes with Russell on the set of the film, saying, "David O. Russell is one of my closest friends and we have an amazing collaborative working relationship. I adore this man and he does not deserve this tabloid malarkey. This movie is going great and I'm having a blast making it!" After wrapping up in Wilmington, the production moved to North Reading, where shooting took place on March 2–4, 2015, and March 11 and 12.

== Release ==
The film had its world premiere in New York City on December 13. It was released to theaters in the United States on December 25, 2015.

Joy was released on DVD, Blu-ray and Ultra HD Blu-ray on May 3, 2016, by 20th Century Fox Home Entertainment.

In 2022, a stage musical titled Joy premiered at the George Street Playhouse in New Brunswick, New Jersey, starring Erika Henningsen in the title role. Mangano had sold the stage rights to theatrical producer Ken Davenport, and she attended the premiere performance on December 16, 2022.

== Reception ==
=== Box office ===
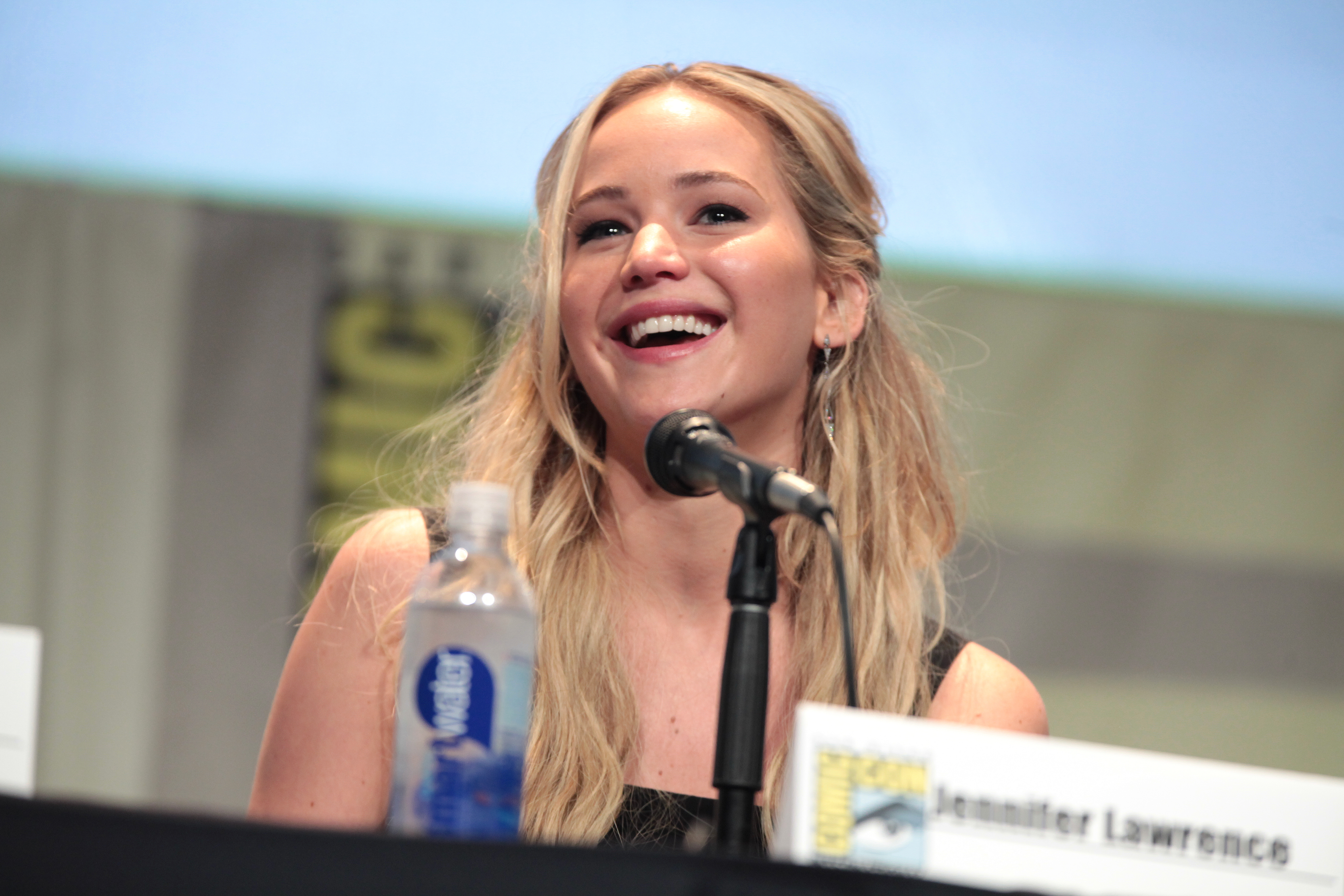
Jennifer Lawrence's performance received positive reviews from critics. She received her fourth Academy Award nomination for her performance, becoming, at age 25, the youngest person in history to receive four Oscar nominations.

Joy grossed $56.4 million in the U.S. and Canada and $44.7 million in other countries, for a worldwide total of $101.1 million against a budget of $60 million.

In the United States and Canada, the film opened on December 25, 2015, alongside Point Break, Daddy's Home and Concussion, as well as the wide release of The Big Short. In its opening weekend, it was projected to gross $13–15 million from 2,896 theaters. It ultimately grossed $17 million, finishing third at the box office behind Star Wars: The Force Awakens ($149.2 million) and Daddy's Home ($38.7 million).

=== Critical response ===
Joy received mixed reviews from critics. On the review aggregator website Rotten Tomatoes, the film has an approval rating of 61%, based on 271 reviews, with an average rating of 6.3/10. The site's consensus reads: "Joy is anchored by a strong performance from Jennifer Lawrence, although director David O. Russell's uncertain approach to its fascinating fact-based tale only sporadically sparks bursts of the titular emotion." On Metacritic, the film has a weighted average score of 56 out of 100, based on 48 critics, indicating "mixed or average" reviews. Audiences polled by CinemaScore gave the film an average grade of "B+" on a scale of A+ to F.

=== Accolades ===
Award	Category	Recipient(s)	Result
Academy Awards	Best Actress	Jennifer Lawrence	Nominated
AARP Annual Movies for Grownups Awards	Best Picture		Nominated
AARP Annual Movies for Grownups Awards	Best Comedy		Nominated
AARP Annual Movies for Grownups Awards	Best Time Capsule		Nominated
AARP Annual Movies for Grownups Awards	Best Supporting Actress	Diane Ladd	Won
AARP Annual Movies for Grownups Awards	Best Supporting Actor	Robert De Niro	Nominated
AARP Annual Movies for Grownups Awards	Best Screenwriter	David O. Russell	Won
AARP Annual Movies for Grownups Awards	Best Director	David O. Russell	Nominated
ACE Eddie Awards	Best Edited Feature Film – Comedy or Musical	Alan Baumgarten, Jay Cassidy, Tom Cross and Christopher Tellefsen	Nominated
Art Directors Guild Awards	Contemporary Film	Judy Becker	Nominated
Casting Society of America	Big Budget – Comedy	Mary Vernieu, Lindsay Graham, Angela Peri	Nominated
Costume Designers Guild Awards	Excellence in Contemporary Film	Michael Wilkinson	Nominated
Critics' Choice Awards	Best Actress	Jennifer Lawrence	Nominated
Critics' Choice Awards	Best Comedy		Nominated
Critics' Choice Awards	Best Actress in a Comedy	Jennifer Lawrence	Nominated
Denver Film Critics Society	Best Comedy		Nominated
Detroit Film Critics Society	Best Actress	Jennifer Lawrence	Nominated
Detroit Film Critics Society	Best Ensemble		Nominated
Golden Globe Awards	Best Motion Picture – Musical or Comedy		Nominated
Golden Globe Awards	Best Actress in a Motion Picture – Comedy or Musical	Jennifer Lawrence	Won
MTV Movie Awards	Best Female Performance	Jennifer Lawrence	Nominated
MTV Movie Awards	True Story		Nominated
Teen Choice Awards	Choice Movie Actress: Drama	Jennifer Lawrence	Won
MovieGuide Awards	Faith & Freedom Award for Movies		Won
