= My First Time (play) =

- Official Logo
- Written by: Ken Davenport
- Original language: English
- Genre: Interactive Theater

Premiere
- Date premiered: December 7, 2007
- Place premiered: New World Stages; New York, NY
- Official website

My First Time is an off-Broadway play that opened on July 12, 2007, at New World Stages and ran until January 22, 2010. The show is based on a website that grew in popularity in 1998. The site "allowed people to anonymously share their own true stories about their First Times" and "features four actors in hysterical and heartbreaking stories about first sexual experiences written by real people ... just like you." Experiences submitted by the audience before the performance are featured during the show, and My First Time received press from CNN.com, TMZ and Forbes when it featured a promotion during which virgins could attend the play for free.

== Production history ==
The show is produced by Ken Davenport, producer of Altar Boyz and creator of The Awesome 80s Prom and BroadwaySpace. Looking towards a new theatrical climate, Davenport "is trying new things with 'My First Time,' for which he raised only $175,000 to capitalize. He’s running the show just three nights a week and doing all the advertising, marketing and group ticket sales out of his production office."

The show opened at New World Stages in 2007 and its original cast consisted of Bill Dawes, Josh Heine, Kathy Searle and Cydnee Welburn. There have since been productions in Korea, Mexico, Spain, Poland, Australia and all over the United States.
