= Gettin' the Band Back Together =

- Logo for the Broadway Production
- Music: Mark Allen
- Lyrics: Mark Allen
- Book: Ken Davenport and the Grundleshotz
- Productions: 2013 George Street Playhouse; 2014 Pre-Broadway Workshop; 2018 Broadway

Gettin' the Band Back Together is a musical with music and lyrics by Mark Allen and a book by Ken Davenport and the Grundleshotz, a group of performers and writers including Sebastian Arcelus, Fred Berman, Michael Hirstreet, Jenna Coker Jones, Craig Jorczak, Nathan Kaufman, Jay Klaitz, Emily McNamara, Jennifer Miller, Bhavesh Patel, Sarah Saltzberg and Fletcher Young.

== Production history ==
=== George Street Playhouse, 2013 ===
Originally titled "Garage Band," Gettin' the Band Back Together was developed through a four-year improvisational rehearsal process by Ken Davenport and the Grundleshotz. It premiered at the George Street Playhouse on September 24, 2013, starring Alison Fraser and Mitchell Jarvis. The production was directed by John Rando and choreographed by Kelly Devine. Residents of Sayreville, New Jersey, the musical's setting and Jon Bon Jovi's hometown, were offered half-price tickets to the production's final preview performance on October 3, and first responders and emergency workers from Sayreville were offered complimentary tickets.

=== Pre-Broadway Workshop, 2014 ===
On June 24, 2014, Gettin' the Band Back Together had a workshop performance in New York City starring Constantine Maroulis and Marilu Henner and directed by John Rando.

=== Broadway 2018 ===
The musical opened on Broadway at the Belasco Theatre on July 19, 2018, in previews with opening night on August 13. The production is directed by Rando with choreography by Chris Bailey, scenic design by Derek McLane, costume design by Emily Rebholz and lighting design by Ken Billington.

The musical closed on September 16, 2018, after 40 performances and 30 previews.

=== Licensing ===
Upon closing of the Broadway run, Broadway Licensing acquired the rights for all future professional and amateur productions.

== Plot ==
In New York City, businessman Mitch Papadopolous is fired on his fortieth birthday. He returns to Sayreville, New Jersey, his hometown, to move back in with his mother, Sharon ("Jersey"). Mitch's best friend, Bart, suggests they reunite their old band, Juggernaut, and when Tygen Billows, their nemesis from high school, learns that Mitch has returned to Sayreville, he challenges Mitch to a rematch of the Battle of the Bands competition that Juggernaut won twenty years earlier.

Mitch is initially reluctant to reunite the band ("One of Those Guys"), but when Tygen threatens to foreclose on Sharon's and Bart's houses, Mitch agrees to enter the Battle of the Bands on the condition that if his band wins, Sharon and Bart will get to keep their houses. Mitch and Bart convince their old band-mates, Sully and Robbie, to get the band back together ("Gettin' the Band Back Together"), with the exception of Kenny, who died while playing a concert at an amusement park two years earlier ("Kenny's Hymn"). The band replaces Kenny with Ricky, a sixteen-year-old student from the local high school where Bart teaches math.

Juggernaut begins rehearsals, encouraged by Sharon, and book their first gig playing a Jewish wedding ("Hava Nagila"). Mitch begins talking to Dani, his ex from high school who is dating Tygen. Mitch and Tygen get into a fist fight at a bar, landing Juggernaut in jail ("Life Without Parole").

The band gets out of jail just in time for the Battle of the Bands, where Juggernaut performs their new song ("Do Over").

== Musical numbers ==
Act I

- "Jersey" - Mitch and Company
- "How Does Your Mouthfeel?" - Tygen and Mouthfeel
- "One of Those Guys" - Mitch and Company
- "Jersey" (Reprise) - Tygen and Mouthfeel
- "Gettin' the Band Back Together" - Mitch, Bart, Sully, Robbie and Company
- "Find the One" - Robbie, Juggernaut and Company
- "Best Day of My Life" - Mitch, Dani and Company
- "WWJD" - Sharon, Juggernaut and Company

Act II

- "Hava Naglia" - Ricky, Billie and Company
- "Second Chances" - Nick
- "I Just Want Real" - Dani, Roxanne, Sharon, Tawney and Billie
- "Life Without Parole" - Sully and Company
- "Battle of Your Life" - Roxanne, Juggernaut, Mouthfeel and Company
- "Bart's Confession" - Bart
- "Best Band in the World" - Mouthfeel
- "One of Those Guys" (Reprise) - Mitch
- "Do Over" - Mitch and Company
- "Jersey" (Reprise) - Mitch and Company

== Original casts ==
Character	George Street Playhouse (2013)	Pre-Broadway Workshop (2014)	Broadway (2018)
Mitch Papadopolous	Mitchell Jarvis	Constantine Maroulis	Mitchell Jarvis
Bart Vickers	Jay Klaitz	Jay Klaitz	Jay Klaitz
Michael “Sully” Sullivan	Adam Monley	Adam Monley	Paul Whitty
Rummesh "Robbie" Patel	Manu Narayan	Manu Narayan	Manu Narayan
Ritchie Lorenzo	Garth Kravitz	Garth Kravitz	Garth Kravitz
Tygen Billows	Brandon Williams	Brandon Williams	Brandon Williams
Sharon Papadopolous	Alison Fraser	Marilu Henner	Marilu Henner
Dani Franco	Michelle Duffy	Michelle Duffy	Kelli Barrett
Roxanne Velasco	Deidre Goodwin	Natalie Venetia Belcon	Tamika Lawrence
Tawny Truebody	Emily McNamara	Emily McNamara	Becca Kötte
Ricky "Bling" Goldstein	Evan Daves	Evan Daves	Sawyer Nunes
Billie Franco	Heather Braverman	Heather Braverman	Noa Solorio

== Original cast recordings ==
An original cast recording of the George Street Playhouse production of Gettin' the Band Back Together was released on December 27, 2013.

=== Song list ===
- "Jersey" - Mitch, Bart, Sully, Robbie, Ensemble
- "One of Those Guys" - Mitch
- "Gettin' the Band Back Together" - Mitch, Bart, Sully, Robbie
- "Kenny's Hymn" - Mitch, Bart, Sully, Robbie
- "Hava Nagila" - Ricky, Ensemble
- "Life Without Parole" - Mitch, Bart, Sully, Robbie, Ricky, Drunk Guy
- "Bart's Confession" - Bart, Ensemble
- "Do Over" - Mitch, Bart, Sully, Robbie, Ricky

An original Broadway cast recording, produced by Sh-K-Boom Records, was recorded on August 22, 2018, and released on September 28, 2018.
