= Be a Broadway Star =

Board game

- Publication: 2010
- Players: 2–6
- Setup time: 5 minutes
- Playing time: 30-60 minutes
- Skills: Counting, Trivia

Be a Broadway Star is a board game for two to six players created by Broadway producer Ken Davenport.

== Gameplay ==
Players take the role of up and coming Broadway actors trying to become the most popular actor on Broadway. The object of Be a Broadway Star is to acquire the most "Fans," as determined by "Fan Cards" earned throughout the game through a variety of tasks. Players move around a game board similar to The Game of Life, with movement determined by two rolled dice. Players begin with $1,000 and roll the dice to determine who goes first. The player with the highest roll moves first, unless there is a player named "Tony;" if there is, that player moves first. Players begin the game on "Start" and advance the combined number of spaces indicated by the two dice, then follow the instructions on the space on which they land.

Landing spaces indicate a variety of actions, such as paying and receiving money, gaining or losing "Fan Cards," and auditioning for Broadway shows.

When players land on an "Audition" space, they draw a card from the "Audition" card deck that indicates what show and role they are auditioning for. Shows players can audition for include The Phantom of the Opera, Into the Woods, West Side Story, The Book of Mormon, The Lion King, and Rent, among others.

When a player is cast in their first show, they must collect their "Equity Card" and begin paying dues to Actors' Equity Association. When a player is cast in their second show, they have the opportunity to hire an agent, and they have the opportunity to hire a publicist after their third successful audition.

When a player reaches the "Tony Awards Track" on the board, they are able to move down that path only if they have a publicist and are cast in a show. If they do choose the "Tony Awards Track," they are eligible to win a Tony Award and receive a "Tony Award Card," which allocates a higher salary and more "Fans" when the player is cast in future shows.

When a player lands on a "Make or Break" space, they draw a card from the "Make or Break" deck that describes a performance challenge, such as improvising a monologue, reciting Shakespeare, or impersonating a Broadway star. If the player is able to complete the challenge, they are rewarded with "Fans."

The game ends when all players reach the "Broadway Hall of Fame" at the end of the board. The player with the most "Fans" is the winner and is awarded the title "Broadway Star."

== History ==
Be a Broadway Star was released in 2010 by Broadway producer Ken Davenport. It was named one of Kathie Lee Gifford and Hoda Kotb's "Favorite Things" on NBC's Today in 2011, has appeared in Time Out Kids and the Gleek Guide, and was featured in the New York Times. It is one of Amazon.com's most popular Broadway-themed gifts.

== See also ==
- The Game of Life (board game)
