= Joy (musical) =

2023 musical based on the 2015 film

- Music: AnnMarie Milazzo
- Lyrics: AnnMarie Milazzo
- Book: Ken Davenport
- Basis: Inventing Joy
- Premiere: December 16, 2022: Elizabeth Ross Johnson Theatre
- Productions: 2022 New Jersey

Joy is a 2022 stage musical with music and lyrics by AnnMarie Milazzo, and a book by Ken Davenport. It is based on the life story of entrepreneur and inventor Joy Mangano, using her autobiography Inventing Joy and the 2015 film Joy as a basis for the story.

The show debuted in New Jersey at the George Street Playhouse in 2022, with previews beginning on December 9 and a premiere date on December 16.

== Synopsis ==
The true story is about one woman's triumphant climb, from divorce to single motherhood and bankruptcy, to becoming a wildly successful dynamo that all started with the invention of a mop—her Miracle Mop! Based on the life of Joy Mangano—the entrepreneur, inventor, best-selling author, and self-made millionaire whose journey epitomizes the real American Dream.

== George Street Playhouse (2022) ==
The world premiere production was directed by Casey Hushion, with choreography by Joshua Bergasse, music direction by Rick Edinger, scene design by Anna Louizos, costume design by Tina McCartney, light design by Jen Schriever, and sound design by Dan Moses Schreier. Mangano attended the opening night performance with her family. In an interview with the Delaware County Daily Times, she stated "In the musical, Ken Davenport and AnnMarie Milazzo show how much family dynamics drove me to conquer obstacles, fight to get my product seen, and work hard to get it into people’s homes."

== Off-Broadway (2025) ==
The musical premiered Off-Broadway at the Laura Pels Theatre, with previews beginning June 21, 2025 and an opening date of July 20. The show was directed by Lorin Latarro with choreography by Joshua Bergasse. Betsy Wolfe led the production as Joy Mangano. The musical closed on August 17, 2025.

== Musical numbers (select) ==
Composer Annemarie Milazzo released eleven songsfrom the show on the album The Shape of Things: Songs from Joy the Musical
The tracklist for the album includes:

- "Welcome to My World"
- "The Shape of Things"
- "Outta Here"
- "I Got People"
- "The Only Mop You'll Ever Need"
- "We Sell Stories"
- "Is This as Good As It Gets?"
- "Walk With Me"
- "Mother's Daughter"
- "Have You Ever Felt That?"
- "Make a Miracle"

== Cast and characters ==
Character	George Street Playhouse (2022)	Off-Broadway (2025)
Joy Mangano	Erika Henningsen	Betsy Wolfe
Rudy Mangano, Joy's father	Stephen DeRosa	Adam Grupper
Christie Miranne, Joy's daughter	Sami Bray	Honor Blue Savage
Toots Mangano, Joy's mother	Vicki Lewis	Jill Abramovitz
Tony Miranne, Joy's ex-husband	Trent Saunders	Brandon Espinoza
Dan	Pomme Koch	Charl Brown
Ronni, Joy's father's girlfriend	Badia Farha	Gabriela Carrillo
Cowboy Eddie	John Hickok	Paul Whitty
Lorraine	x	Jaygee Macapugay
