= Joy Mangano =

American inventor

- Born: February 15, 1956 (age 70); Brooklyn, New York
- Education: Pace University
- Occupation: Entrepreneur
- Years active: 1989–Present
- Spouse: Anthony Miranne (m. 1978; div. 1989)
- Children: 3
- Website: joymangano.com

Joy Mangano (/mæŋˈɡænoʊ/ mang-GAN-oh; born February 15, 1956) is an American inventor and entrepreneur known for inventions such as the self-wringing Miracle Mop. She was the president of Ingenious Designs, LLC, and appeared regularly on the U.S. television shopping channel HSN until her departure in late 2018. Mangano is the founder and CEO of Clean Boss, a company that develops and sells cleaning products.

Mangano released her autobiography, Inventing Joy, in 2017. The 2015 film Joy was loosely based on her life. Jennifer Lawrence won a Golden Globe Award for Best Actress – Motion Picture Comedy or Musical and was nominated for the Academy Award for Best Actress for her portrayal of Mangano. A stage musical inspired by her life premiered in 2022, also titled Joy.

In 2021, she premiered a reality competition show on USA Network for aspiring entrepreneurs called America's Big Deal.

== Early life ==
Mangano was born in Brooklyn and raised in Huntington, New York. Mangano began inventing at an early age when, as a teenager working at an animal hospital in Huntington, New York, on Long Island, she dreamed up a fluorescent flea collar to keep pets safe. A product with a similar design was released the next year by Hartz Mountain. After graduating from Pace University with a degree in business administration in 1978, she held a variety of jobs, including waitress and airline reservations manager while raising her three children as a divorced mother.

== Career ==
Mangano is a named inventor of 71 patent families and 126 distinct patent publications for her inventions. "I think my products have been successful because they have mass appeal. I'm just like everybody else out there. I'm a mom, I work, I have a house to clean, things to organize. We all have similar needs, and I address them."

=== Miracle Mop ===
In 1990 after growing frustrated with ordinary mops, Mangano developed her first invention, the "Miracle Mop", a self-wringing plastic mop with a head made from a continuous loop of 300 feet (90 meters) of cotton that can be easily wrung out without getting one's hands wet. With her own savings and investments from family and friends, she made a prototype and manufactured 1000 units.

The mop sold modestly at first, but once QVC allowed Mangano to go on-air to sell it herself, she sold 18,000 mops in less than a half hour. Mangano incorporated her business as Arma Products, later renaming it Ingenious Designs. She sold Ingenious Designs to USA Networks, the parent company of the HSN, in 1999. By the year 2000, the company was selling $10 million worth of Miracle Mops per year.

=== CleanBoss ===
In 2020, Mangano launched CleanBoss, a non-toxic cleaning product brand. In 2023, CleanBoss announced rapper Pitbull as a co-founder. He is one of the largest investors in the company, alongside Mangano and Irving Place Capital’s John D. Howard.

=== Other products ===
- Huggable Hangers – velvet-flocked, no-slip hangers whose thin profile conserves closet space. Endorsed by Oprah Winfrey, Huggable Hangers were HSN's best-selling product as of 2010, with more than 1 billion sold.
- Forever Fragrant – a line of home odor neutralizers including sticks, wickless candles, scent stands, finials, spheres, drawer liners, and shoe shapers. Mangano broke an HSN record on January 31, 2010, by selling 180,000 units in one day. The Forever Fragrant line has earned the Good Housekeeping Seal of Approval.
- Clothes It All Luggage System – wheeled luggage with organizational features like a padded laptop compartment, a toiletry organizer, a pocket for plane tickets, and removable dividers. They range from smaller duffel bags to a 22-inch (56-centimeter) portable dresser with removable drawers, as well as a briefcase and pet carrier.
- Performance Platforms – shoes with a rubber platform heel that gives the wearer extra height. In May 2010, Mangano sold 30,000 pairs in three hours on HSN. The line began as sneakers, and has since branched to Mary Janes, mules, and sandals. The shoes are produced in conjunction with the Grasshoppers division of the Stride Rite Corporation.
- Comfort & Joy Textiles – bedding made from Supima cotton and down alternative with a reversible, zippered duvet cover and sheets that are attached to the bed skirt for removal and cleaning.
- Shades Readers – a line of reading glasses sold in sets of three or more so that they can be kept around the home and office for easy access. Mangano has sold more than 13 million pairs.

=== Television ===
Soon after she began appearing on QVC in 1992, she began appearing regularly on HSN and is considered the network's most successful purveyor, with annual sales of more than $150 million. Her hourly sales regularly top $1 million. Mangano has also appeared in shorter commercials and infomercials for her company's products. She said that while selling on television is an opportunity to reach millions of people, it requires genuine enthusiasm to persuade people who can't touch or try the product. A HSN executive wrote that Mangano's success is due to her ability to convey her "passion, excitement and pride of every detail with her viewers." In 2019 after nearly two decades, she left HSN to pursue other professional opportunities. However, by 2022, Mangano was again appearing regularly on HSN promoting her CleanBoss line of home, personal and cleaning products.

==== Other television appearances ====
In 2005, Mangano was a judge on the cable reality show Made in the USA. She also appeared on the ABC show The View on February 2, 2007.

== Awards and distinctions ==
In 1997, Mangano was named Long Island Entrepreneur of the Year by Ernst & Young. In 2009, she was ranked number 77 on Fast Company's list of The 100 Most Creative People in Business; and in 2010, she was included in their list of The 10 Most Creative Women in Business.

Mangano currently sits on the advisory board for the United Inventors Association (UIA).

== In popular culture ==
A character based on Mangano is portrayed by Jennifer Lawrence in the 2015 film Joy, directed by David O. Russell, with Mangano credited as executive producer. It was released on Christmas Day 2015.

In 2018, it was reported that a musical production depicting Mangano's life story is being developed by Tony-winning producer Ken Davenport, who acquired the musical rights and plans to bring it to the stage.

== Personal life ==
Mangano married Tony Miranne in 1978 shortly after both graduated from Pace University. They divorced in 1989. They have three children: Christie, Robert, and Jacqueline Miranne.

== See also ==
- List of inventors
