= The Awesome 80s Prom =

- Official Logo
- Original language: English
- Written by: Ken Davenport and the Class of '89
- Genre: Interactive Theater

Premiere
- Date: September 10, 2004
- Place: Webster Hall; New York, NY
- Official website

The Awesome 80s Prom was an interactive off-Broadway show at Webster Hall in the style of Tony n' Tina's Wedding and The Donkey Show set at Wanaget High's Senior Prom. It was co-created by Kathy Searle.

Prom characters are inspired by 1980s movie favorites from the Captain of the Football Team to the Asian Exchange Student, from the Geek to the Head Cheerleader. Everyone is competing for Prom King and Queen and the audience decides who wins.

The original production transferred from Webster Hall to The Wall in July 2013 before closing on November 2, 2013. While the Off Broadway production ended, The Awesome 80s Prom has played in many U.S. cities, including Chicago, Boston, and Baltimore.

== Cast ==
The original 2004 workshop cast featured Sheila Berzan, Alex Back, Adam Bloom, Anne Bobby, Courtney Balan, Mary Faber, Emily McNamara, Troy Metcalf, Jenna Pace, Amanda Ryan Paige, Mark Shunock, Josh Walden, Noah Weisberg, Brandon Williams, Simon Wong and Fletcher Young, many of whom went on to star in the production when it opened on September 10, 2004.

In May 2010, the cast was expanded to feature Dustin Diamond who played Samuel "Screech" Powers in the popular television program Saved by the Bell.
