= Ken Davenport =

American theatre producer (born 1972)

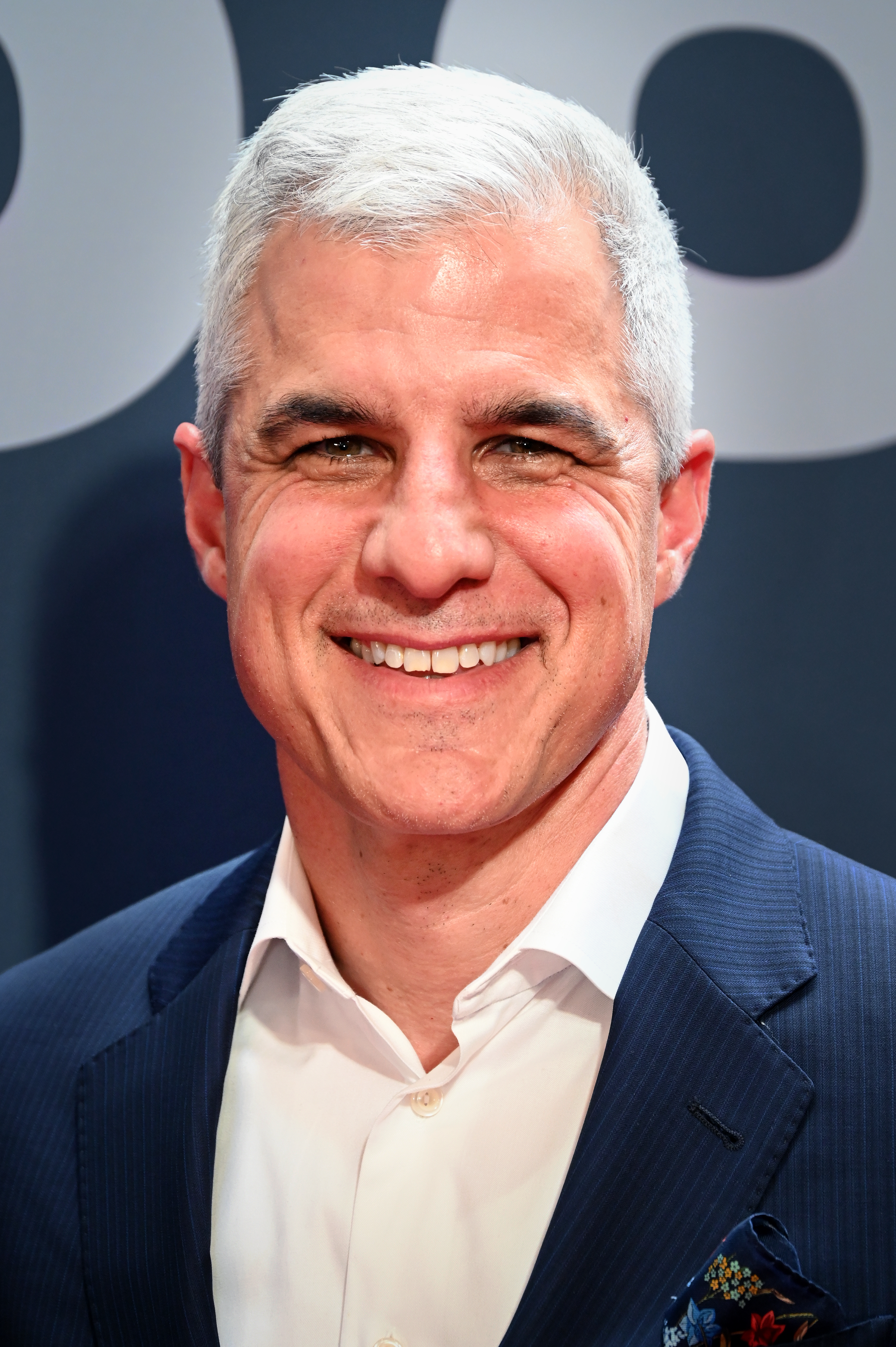
- Davenport in 2026
- Born: Kenneth Anjum Hasija; August 23, 1972 (age 54); Phoenix, Arizona, U.S.
- Education: New York University, Tisch School of Arts
- Occupations: Writer, Producer
- Years active: 1993–present
- Spouse: Tracy Weiler (m. 2014)
- Website: kendavenport.com

Ken Davenport (born Kenneth Anjum Hasija, August 23, 1972) is a two-time Tony Award-winning theatre producer, blogger, and writer. He is best known for his production work on Broadway.

== Early life ==
Davenport was born in Phoenix, Arizona to Dr. Kenny Hasija and Pamela Soper (née Davenport). He grew up in Sturbridge, Massachusetts, and attended the Bancroft School in Worcester, Massachusetts. He attended Johns Hopkins University for one year with the intention of practicing law, before transferring to New York University's Tisch School of the Arts. He graduated in 1994 with a Bachelor of Fine Arts in Acting.

Davenport began his professional theater career by working as a production assistant on the 1993 Broadway revival of My Fair Lady starring Richard Chamberlain. Before he began his producing career, he established himself as a company and general manager, working on shows such as Grease, Show Boat, Ragtime, Thoroughly Modern Millie, and Gypsy.

== Career ==
Davenport founded the company Davenport Theatrical Enterprises (DTE) in 2004, and has created, produced, and managed Broadway shows. His first ventures as a producer were the three Off-Broadway shows The Awesome 80s Prom, Altar Boyz, and My First Time, which he also wrote. Davenport's first Broadway credit as a producer was 13, and since then he has produced over 20 Broadway shows, including the first Broadway revival of Godspell, the Tony Award-winning Best Musical Kinky Boots, and Deaf West Theatre's Spring Awakening.

Since its founding, Davenport Theatrical Enterprises has expanded to other areas of the theater business including Broadway Genius Group Sales, a group sales agency for Broadway and Off-Broadway shows; DTE Agency, a theatrical marketing agency; and DTE Management, a general management division. In 2019, DTE Management relaunched as Architect Theatrical. Additionally, DTE launched Did He Like It?, a review aggregator for New York Times chief theatre critic Ben Brantley and Davenport is the creator of Be a Broadway Star, the only Broadway-themed board game. Did He Like It was sold in 2018.

Davenport's television and film credits include the documentary These Magnificent Miles: On the Road with Red Wanting Blue, and The Bunny Hole, an award-winning television pilot that has appeared in the LA Indie Film Festival, the Orlando Film Festival, the LA Comedy Festival and more.

He managed and owned the Davenport Theatre, an Off-Broadway theater in Manhattan's Theater District until its January 2019 closure. The Davenport Theatre had two performance spaces, a 149-seat main stage on the ground level, and a 60-seat blackbox theater on the upper level. Davenport named the theater after his great-grandfather, Delbert Essex Davenport, who was a theater producer, publicist, author and lyricist in the early 1900s

== Other activities ==
Davenport was named one of Crain's "40 Under 40", and received the 2010 Leonidas A. Nickole Award of Distinction from the Musical Theatre Society of Emerson College. He won the 2008 Spirit of Theatre Award from Theatre Resources Unlimited, and his television pilot The Bunny Hole has been honored at the Orlando Film Festival, the IndieFEST Film Awards, and more.

Davenport has taught “Acting As A Business” for America Online, and his marketing techniques have been profiled in the New York Times. Davenport was a member of the BMI Librettist Workshop and is a founding member of the Independent Theater Bloggers Association.

Davenport is a member of The Broadway League and the Off Broadway League.

== Productions ==
* 2026, A Beautiful Noise: The Neil Diamond Musical (Princess Theatre, Melbourne, Australia)
- 2026, Paranormal Activity (Broadway, August Wilson Theatre)
- 2026, Paranormal Activity (Emerson Colonial Theatre, Boston)
- 2025, Reunions (New York City Center Stage II)
- 2025, Paranormal Activity (Chicago Shakespeare Theatre)
- 2025, JOY: A New True Musical (Off-Broadway)
- 2025, SMASH (Broadway)
- 2025, Othello (Broadway)
- 2025, Operation Mincemeat: A New Musical (Broadway)
- Untitled, Slumdog Millionaire: The Musical (in development, score by A.R. Rahman)
- 2024, Gypsy (Broadway)
- 2024, A Beautiful Noise: The Neil Diamond Musical (North American Tour)
- 2024, Oh, Mary! (Broadway)
- 2024, Sister Act (UK Tour)
- 2024, Paranormal Activity (Leeds Playhouse)
- 2023, Harmony: A New Musical (Broadway)
- 2023, Gutenberg! The Musical! (Broadway)
- 2022, A Beautiful Noise: The Neil Diamond Musical (Broadway)
- 2022 (announced), The Ten
- 2022, Joy (George Street Playhouse)
- 2022, The Griswolds' Broadway Vacation (Seattle, 5th Avenue Theater)
- 2022, A Beautiful Noise: The Neil Diamond Musical (Boston)
- 2022, Harmony: A New Musical (National Yiddish Theatre Folksbiene)
- 2020, Americano! (Phoenix Theatre Company)
- 2019, Frankie and Johnny in the Clair de Lune (Broadway)
- 2018, Gettin' The Band Back Together (Broadway)
- 2017, Once on This Island (Broadway)
- 2017, Groundhog Day (Broadway)
- 2017, The Play That Goes Wrong (Broadway)
- 2015, Allegiance (Broadway)
- 2015, Daddy Long Legs (Off-Broadway)
- 2015, Spring Awakening (Broadway)
- 2015, That Bachelorette Show (Off-Broadway)
- 2015, The Visit (Broadway)
- 2014, It's Only a Play (Broadway)
- 2014, Mothers and Sons (Broadway)
- 2014, The Bridges of Madison County (Broadway, tour)
- 2013, Gettin' the Band Back Together (George Street Playhouse)
- 2013, Macbeth (Broadway)
- 2013, Kinky Boots (Broadway, tour, Toronto, West End)
- 2011, Godspell (Broadway)
- 2011, Chinglish (Broadway)
- 2010, Miss Abigail's Guide to Dating, Mating, & Marriage (Off-Broadway)
- 2009, Oleanna (Broadway)
- 2009, Blithe Spirit (Broadway, tour, West End)
- 2009, Will Ferrell's You're Welcome America (Broadway)
- 2008, Speed-the-Plow (Broadway)
- 2008, 13 (Broadway)
- 2007, My First Time (Off-Broadway)
- 2005, Altar Boyz (Off-Broadway)
- 2004, The Awesome 80s Prom (Off-Broadway)

== Awards and nominations ==
- 2026: Laurence Olivier Award, Best Entertainment or Comedy Play, Oh, Mary! (winner) Davenport is credited as a producer on the West End production.
- 2026: Prospect Musicals, Muse Award (honoree)
- 2025: Drama Desk Award, Outstanding Revival of a Musical, Gypsy (winner)
- 2025: Tony Award, Best Musical, Operation Mincemeat: A New Musical (nominee)
- 2025: Tony Award, Best Revival of a Musical, Gypsy (nominee)
- 2018: Tony Award, Best Revival of a Musical, Once on This Island (winner)
- 2018: Drama Desk Award, Outstanding Revival of a Musical, Once on This Island (nominee)
- 2017: Tony Award, Best Musical, Groundhog Day (nominee)
- 2016: Tony Award, Best Revival of a Musical, Spring Awakening (nominee)
- 2016: Drama Desk Award, Outstanding Revival of a Musical, Spring Awakening (nominee)
- 2016: Drama Desk Award, Outstanding Musical, Daddy Long Legs (nominee)
- 2015: Tony Award, Best Musical, The Visit (nominee)
- 2015: Drama Desk Award, Outstanding Musical, The Visit (nominee)
- 2014: Tony Award, Best Play, Mothers and Sons (nominee)
- 2014: Drama Desk Award, Outstanding Musical, The Bridges of Madison County (nominee)
- 2013: Tony Award, Best Musical, Kinky Boots (winner)
- 2013: Broadway.com Audience Choice Award, Favorite Play Revival, Macbeth (winner)
- 2012: Drama Desk Award, Outstanding Play, Chinglish (nominee)
- 2012: Broadway.com Audience Choice Award, Favorite Musical Revival, Godspell (winner)
- 2009: Tony Award nominee, Best Special Theatrical Event, Will Ferrell's You're Welcome America (nominee)
- 2009: Broadway.com Audience Choice Award, Favorite Long-Running Off-Broadway Show, Altar Boyz (winner)
- 2009: Drama Desk Award, Outstanding Revival of a Play, Blithe Spirit (nominee)
- 2005: Drama Desk Award, Outstanding New Musical, Altar Boyz (nominee)
- 2005: Outer Critics Circle Award, Outstanding Off Broadway Musical, Altar Boyz (winner)
- 2005: Lucille Lortel Award, Outstanding Musical, Altar Boyz (nominee)
