= Hassler =

Hassler (also Haßler, Häßler, Hässler, Hasler, ...) is a toponymic surname derived from a number of places called Hasel or Hassel in German-speaking parts of Europe.

Notable people with this name include:

== Musicians ==
- A musical dynasty in Nuremberg
  - Isaak Hassler (c.1530 – 1591), organist and father of three brothers:
    - Kasper Hassler (1562–1618), minor composer and publisher
    - Hans Leo Hassler (1564–1612), an important German composer and organist
    - Jakob Hassler (1569–1622), composer most noted for his keyboard works
- Johann Wilhelm Hässler (1747–1822), German organist and composer

== Athletes ==
- Nicole Hassler (1941–1996), French figure skater
- Des Hasler (born 1961), Australian rugby league footballer and coach
- Thomas Häßler (born 1966), former German football player and 1990 World Cup winner
- Dominic Hassler (born 1981), Austrian football player
- Melanie Hasler (born 1998), Swiss bobsledder

== Other professions ==
- Johann Hasler (1548, died after 1602), Swiss theologian and physician
- Ferdinand Rudolph Hassler (1770–1845), first US Coast Survey superintendent
- Emil Hassler (1864–1937) (French:Émile Hassler, Spanish: Emilio Hassler), Swiss physician, ethnographer, naturalist, and botanist
- Friday Hassler (1935–1972), American NASCAR driver
- Alois Hassler (1906–1993), Liechtenstein politician
- Hassler Whitney (1907–1989), American mathematician
- Herbert "Blondie" Hasler (1914–1987), British Marines officer and later a noted single-handed sailor
- Hermann Hassler (1941–2013), Liechtenstein politician and cabaret performer
- Rolf Hassler (1914–1984), German neurobiologist
- Eveline Hasler (born 1933), Swiss writer
- Beat Hasler (1938–2017), Liechtenstein journalist and politician
- Jon Hassler (1933–2008) American novelist for whom is named the Jon Hassler Theater in Plainview, Minnesota
- Marie Hasler (born 1948), New Zealand politician
- Harry Hasler, fictional alter ego of Viktor Giacobbo, one of his most popular satirical figures
- Otmar Hasler (born 1953), Prime Minister of Liechtenstein
- Uwe Hassler (born 1963), German professor of statistics and econometrics
- Adrian Hasler (born 1964), Prime Minister of Liechtenstein
- John Hasler (born 1974), English actor
- Dietmar Hasler (born 1975), Liechtenstein politician
- Johannes Hasler (born 1982), Liechtenstein politician
- Irací Hassler (born 1990), Chilean politician and economist

== See also ==
- Johann Georg Hasler (disambiguation)
