= Alexander Horn =

Scottish Benedictine monk (1762–1820)

Alexander Horn (or Dom Maurus Horn, OSB; 28 June 1762 – 1820), was a Scottish Benedictine monk who became a secret agent and diplomat. His work contributed to the birth of the conspiracy theory of the illuminati.

== Biography ==
Horn was born in the village of Oyne, Aberdeenshire. In 1772, at the age of ten, he was accepted as an oblate by the Scots Monastery in Regensburg, Germany, an imperial abbey in the capital which was then the seat of the Imperial Diet of the Holy Roman Empire. About 1782, when he had come of age, he was admitted to the monastic community as a monk and given the religious name of Maurus and was ordained a Catholic priest around 1785. He was an esteemed librarian at the monastery by 1790, while at the same time working as the Regensburg agent for the British ambassador in Munich. He cultivated close ties with the Thurn und Taxis family and other influential people in the region. Despite being a monk, his social life led to him being described as a "wild young fellow".

Horn wrote anonymously, condemning France's activities in undermining the Holy Roman Empire. He supplied the material that formed the core of John Robison's 1797 allegation of an international conspiracy of freemasons, illuminati, and Jacobins. In 1799 he travelled to England, meeting with members of William Pitt's government including Earl Spencer. He subsequently used his bibliographical expertise to acquire rare books and manuscripts for Spencer's library.

When in 1802 the Eternal Diet of Regensburg, under pressure from Napoleon Bonaparte, determined to secularize all property of the Catholic Church within the Empire, the Scots Monastery was uniquely successful in avoiding this fate. Horn and his abbot, Charles Arbuthnot, OSB, (the last abbot of the monastery) lobbied Jacques MacDonald and Jacques Lauriston, Scottish Catholic generals in the French army. He was by now the official British agent in Regensburg and further appealed to the British government. The Scots Monastery was exempt from German church authorities coming under the sole authority of Holy See and the two monks successfully obtained the support of the Cardinal Protector of Scotland in Rome. An express exemption was made in favour of the Scots Abbey, although it was not allowed to take any new novices.

In 1804 Horn became the official Chargé d'affaires following the expulsion of the British ambassador in Munich at the insistence of Napoleon.
