= Schottenkirche =

Schottenklöster (meaning Scottish monasteries in German, singular: Schottenkloster) is the name applied to the monastic foundations of Irish and Scottish missionaries in Continental Europe, particularly to the Scottish Benedictine monasteries in Germany, which in the beginning of the 13th century were combined into one congregation whose abbot-general was the Abbot of the Scots monastery at Regensburg.

The term Schottenkirche is often the given name to the churches of the Scottish monasteries:

- Schottenkirche, Vienna, in Austria
- Scots Monastery, Regensburg, in Germany
