= St. Egidien, Nuremberg =

Coordinates: 49°27′24″N 11°04′53″E

St Egidien St Giles
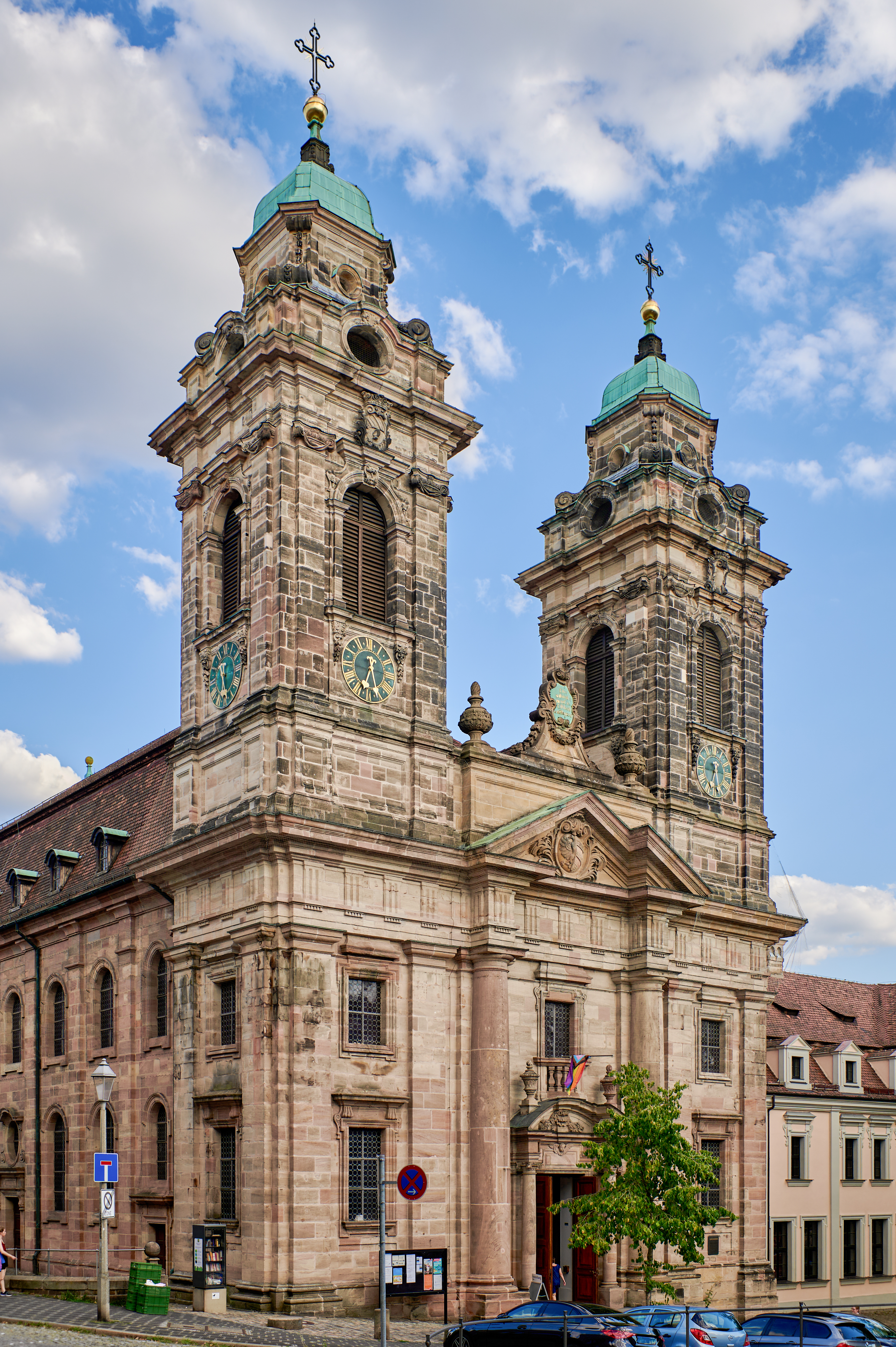
- St Egidien, Nuremberg

Religion
- Affiliation: Evangelical Lutheran Church in Bavaria
- Ecclesiastical or organisational status: parish church

Location
- Location: Nuremberg
- Interactive map of St Egidien; St Giles

Architecture
- Type: Church
- Style: Baroque architecture
- Groundbreaking: 14 October 1711
- Direction of façade: W

St Egidien on Egidienplatz is the former Benedictine Abbey of Saint Giles (Egidienskirche), now a church in the former free imperial city of Nuremberg, southern Germany. It is considered a significant contribution to the baroque church architecture of Middle Franconia.

== History ==
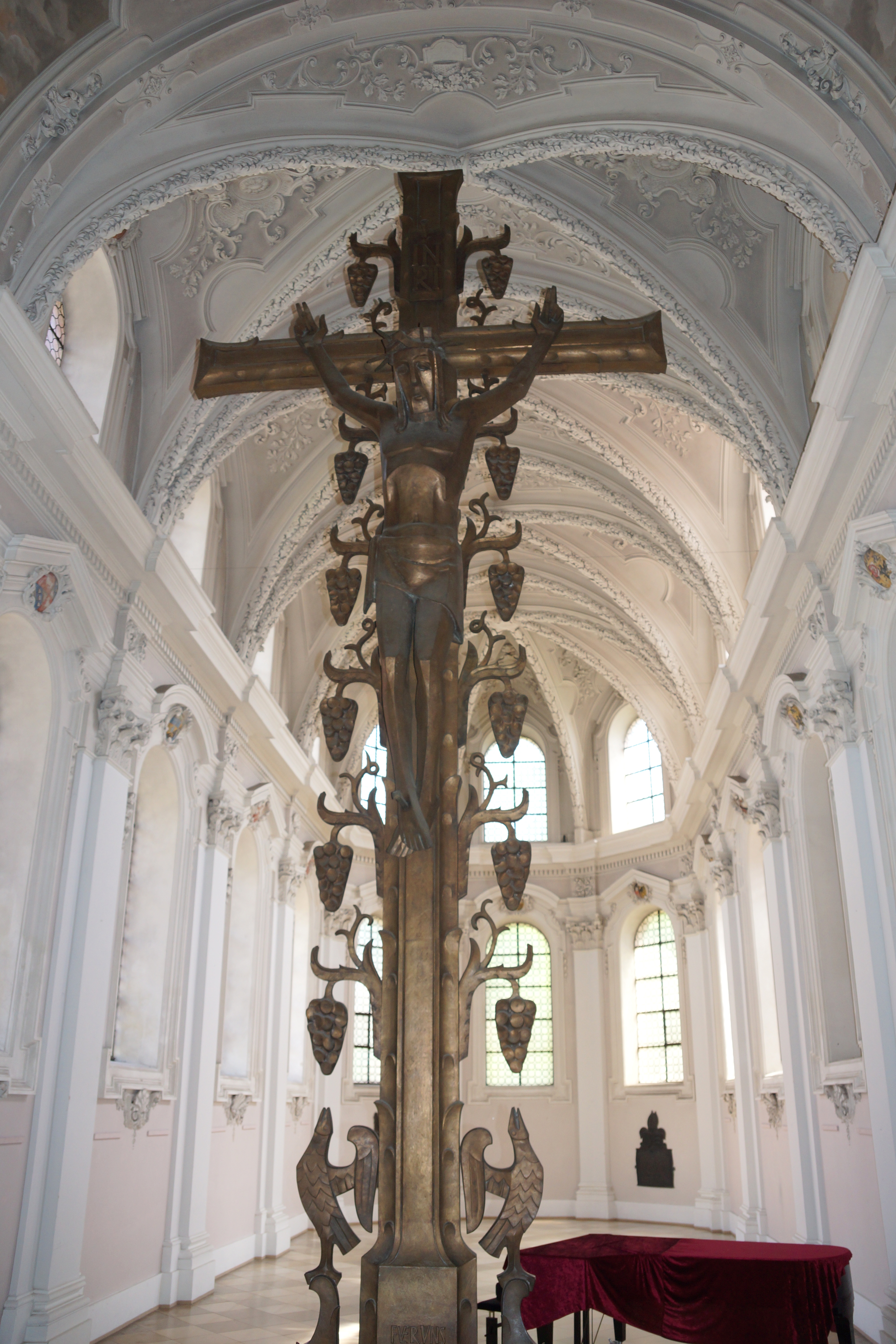
The bronze crucifix by Rudolf Gröschel of 1963

The first church building was probably built in the years 1120/1130 on the site of the second, northern Nuremberg royal court. The royal courts administered royal possessions, agriculture and forestry. Thus, it had the status of a royal church.

Around the year 1140 Emperor Conrad III and his wife Gertrud raised the foundation to the rank of a benedictine abbey and endowed it generously. They made Carus, Abbot of the Scots Monastery, Regensburg, their royal chaplain and the first Abbot of St Egidien. The monastery was rich immediately and subordinate in secular terms only to the Holy Roman Emperor. The first monks came from the Scots Monastery, Regensburg and St. James's Abbey, Würzburg.

It was a three-aisled basilica in the Romanesque style. In 1418, the monastery was impoverished and in debt. The altar vessels were mortgaged, and the Scots Monastery, Regensburg no longer guaranteed the debt. The abbey was taken over by German Benedictines from Reichenbach After the take-over the monastery was partially rebuilt, and the church and chapels were renovated. The Irish monks had to come to terms with the new regime or leave the abbey.

At the Reformation in 1525 the monastery was dissolved, and the monastic estates transferred to the city authorities. After the Peace of Augsburg there were two unsuccessful attempts to recover the former monastic estates for the Benedictine order, firstly in 1578 by the Scottish Bishop John Lesley on behalf of Mary, Queen of Scots, and from 1629 to 1631 by a Commission for the Prince-Bishopric of Bamberg to implement a Roman Catholic Restitution Edict. On 6–7 July 1696 a fire destroyed the monastery and church.

The church was rebuilt in the baroque style. The foundation stone was laid on 14 October 1711. The architects were Johann Trost and Gottlieb Trost. It was the largest construction project in Nuremberg in the 18th century. The stucco decorations were done by Donato Polli. The frescos were painted by Daniel Preisler and Johann Martin Schuster.

The church was badly damaged during the Second World War in an air raid on 2 January 1945. The roof on the nave, crossing, transepts and choir collapsed and the outer walls were badly damaged. It was rebuilt between 1946-59 by Nuremberg architect Rudolf Gröschel in an economically interpretative way, as the costs to reconstruct the baroque interior with its ornate detail was unaffordable at the time.

== Bells ==
There are six bells in the towers.

Nr.	Note	Year of Casting	Bellfounder	Diameter (mm)	Weight (kg)	Tower
1	d^{1} +1	1965	Glockengießerei Bachert, Karlsruhe	1387	1534	South
2	e^{1} −1	1965	Glockengießerei Bachert, Karlsruhe	1240	1066	North
3	g^{1} +1	1959	Glockengießerei Bachert, Karlsruhe	1070	766	South
4	h^{1} −1	1959	Glockengießerei Bachert, Karlsruhe	825	340	North
5	d^{2} +1	1959	Glockengießerei Bachert, Karlsruhe	702	235	North
6	e^{2} ±0	1959	Glockengießerei Bachert, Karlsruhe	640	185	North

== Organ ==
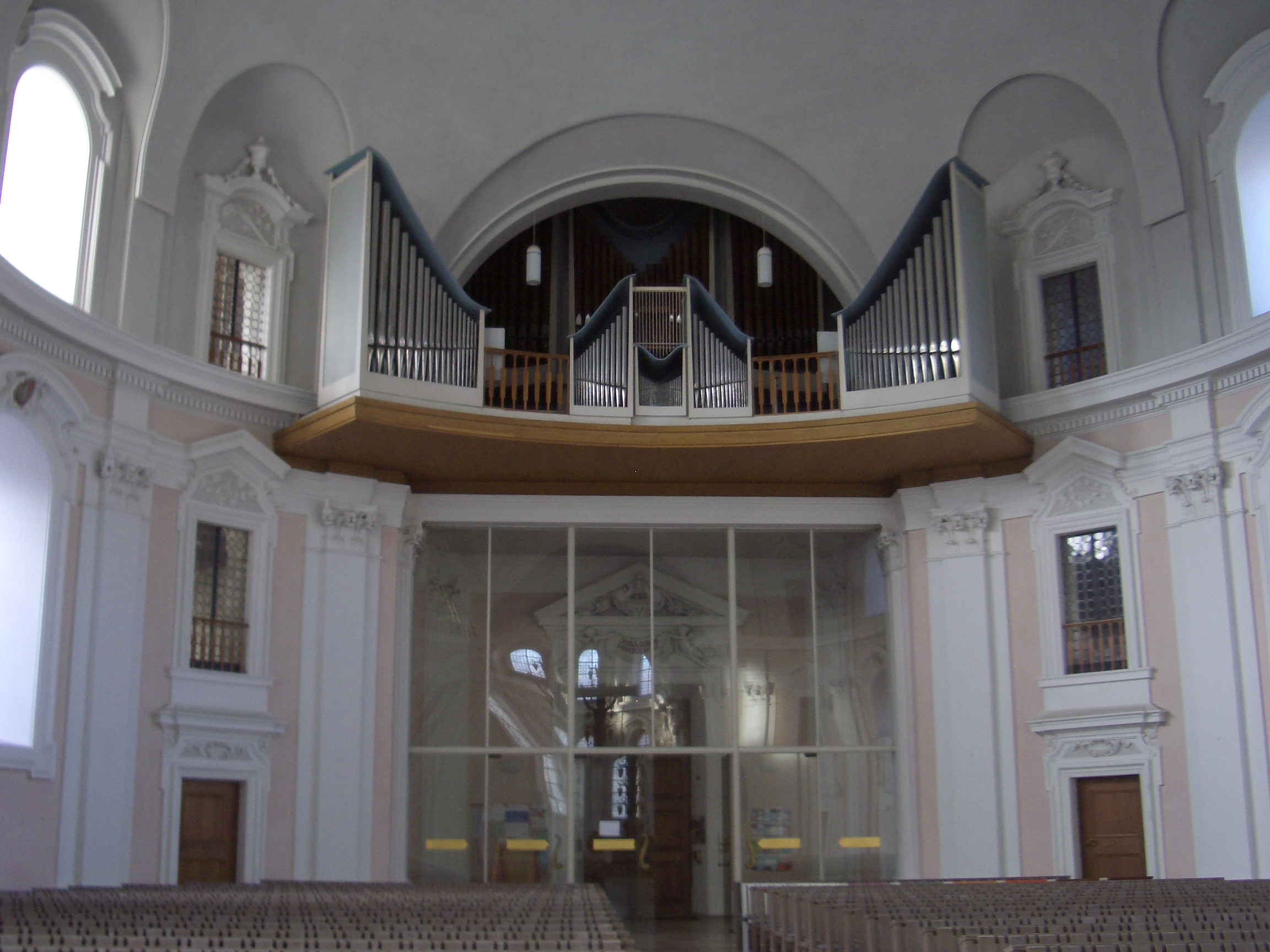
The west end and organ

The church has a long tradition of fine music. The first organ was installed in 1460 by Stephan Kaschendorf from Bratislava. Among its history of organists are:

- Petrus Mayer (organist fl. 1538)
- Hans Haiden (organist 1574 - 1585)
- Kaspar Haßler (organist 1586 - 1587)
- Hans Multerer (organist until 1616)
- Christoph Multerer (organist 1616 - 1622)
- Caspar Neuninger (organist 1622 - 1637)
- Caspar Neumeier (organist 1637 - 1640)
- Johann Erasmus Kindermann (organist 1640 - 1655)
- Paul Heinlein (organist 1655 - 1658)
- Georg Caspar Wecker (1658 - 1686)
- Albrecht Martin Lunßdörffer (organist 1686 - 1687)
- Benedickt Schultheiß (organist 1687 - 1693)
- Johann Siegmund Richter (organist 1693 - 1705)
- Wilhelm Hieronymus Pachelbel (organist 1706 - 1719)
- Cornelius Heinrich Dretzel (organist 1719-1743)
- Johann Thomas Wagner (organist 1814-1818)
- John Gottlieb Fröhr (organist 1814-1823)
- Johann Philip Nußbiegel (organist 1818-1823)
- Georg Frederich Harscher (organist 1847-1870)
- Georg Paul Brecheis (organist 1933-1955)

The current organ was installed in 1963 by Rieger Orgelbau. It has 3 manuals and 43 stops.

- Rückpositiv
- Quintade 8'
- Holzgedackt 8'
- Prinzipal 4'
- Koppelflöte 4'
- Sesquialter 2^{2}/_{3}' + 1^{3}/_{5}'
- Gemshorn 2'
- Quinte 1^{1}/_{3}'
- Scharff 1' 4f.
- Schalmei 8'
- Tremulant
- Hauptwerk
- Pommer 16'
- Prinzipal 8'
- Spitzflöte 8'
- Oktave 4'
- Nachthorn 4'
- Quinte 2 2/3'
- Superoktav 2'
- Rauschwerk 2^{2}/_{3}' 4f.
- Mixtur 1^{1}/_{3}' 6f.
- Fagott 16'
- Trompete 8'
- Schwellwerk
- Prinzipal 8'
- Spitzgambe 8'
- Bleigedackt 8'
- Prinzipal 4'
- Rohrflöte 4'
- Blockflöte 2'
- Terz 1^{3}/_{5}'
- Nasat 2^{2}/_{3}'
- Plein jeu 2' 7f.
- Cimbel ^{1}/_{3}' 3f.
- Trompete 8'
- Oboe 8'
- Tremulant
- Pedal
- Prinzipal 16'
- Subbaß 16'
- Oktav 8'
- Subbaß 8'
- Choralbaß 4' 3f.
- Pommer 4'
- Hohlflöte 2'
- Mixtur 2' 5f.
- Posaune 16'
- Zinke 8'
- Clairon 4'
