= Ninian Winzet =

Scottish priest and polemical writer (1518–1592)

Ninian Winȝet or Winzet (/ˈwɪnjət/ WIN-yət; 1518–1592) was a Scottish Catholic priest and polemical writer. For more on the spelling of his name, see yogh.

== Life ==
Winzet was born in Renfrew, Scotland, and was probably educated at the University of Glasgow. He was ordained priest in 1540, and in 1552 was appointed master of the grammar school of Linlithgow, from which town he was later "expellit and schott out" by the partisans of Dean Patrick Kinlochy, "preacher" there. He had also enjoyed the office of Provost of the Collegiate Church of St Michael in that town. He retired to Edinburgh, where the return of Mary, Queen of Scots, from France had given heart to the Catholics.

There he took part in the pamphlet war which then raged, and entered into conflict with John Knox and other leading reformers. He appears to have acted for a time as confessor to the queen. In July 1562, when engaged in the printing of his Last Blast, he narrowly escaped the vengeance of his opponents, who had by that time gained the upper hand in the capital, and he fled, on 3 September, with the nuncio Gouda, to Leuven.

He reached Paris in 1565 and became a member of the "German Nation" of the university. At Queen Mary's request he joined Bishop Leslie on his embassy to Queen Elizabeth I in 1571, and remained with the bishop after his removal by Elizabeth's orders to ward at Fenny Staunton, Huntingdonshire.

When further suspicion fell on Leslie and he was committed to the Tower, Winzet was permitted to return to Paris. There he continued his studies, and in 1574 left for Douai, where in the following year he became a licentiate. He was in residence at Rome from 1575 to 1577, and was then appointed by Pope Gregory XIII abbot of the Benedictine monastery of St James, Regensburg. There he died on 21 September 1592.

Winzet's works were almost entirely controversial. He justified his literary activity on the side of Catholicism on the double plea of conscience and the inability of the bishops and theologians to supply the necessary arguments (hies' Tractate, ed. STS, i. p. so). "We may nawayis langer contene vs," he wrote, "bot expresse on al sydis as we think, referring our iugement to the haly Catholik Kirk."

In his first work, Certaine Tractates (three in number), printed in 1562, he rated his fellow clergy for negligence and sin, invited replies from Knox regarding his authority as minister and his share in the new ecclesiastical constitution, and protested against the interference with Catholic burgesses by the magistrates of Edinburgh. The Last Blast, which was interrupted in publication, was an onslaught on heretics and a falsely ordained clergy.

In his Buke of Four Scoir Thre Questions (1563), addressed to the "Calviniane Precheouris," in which he treated church doctrine, sacraments, priesthood, obedience to rulers, free-will and other matters, he was dogmatic rather than polemical. He translated the Commonitorium of Vincentius Lirinensis (1563), and wrote, in Latin, a Flagellum sectarionum and a Velitatio in Georgium Buchananum (1582).

== Works ==
Winzet's vernacular writings were edited by J. Hewison for the Scottish Text Society (2 vols, 1888, 1890). The Tractates were printed, with a preface by David Laing, by the Maitland Club (1835).
