= Verbum caro factum est =

Sacred motet by Hans Leo Hassler

- Sacred motet by Hans Leo Hassler
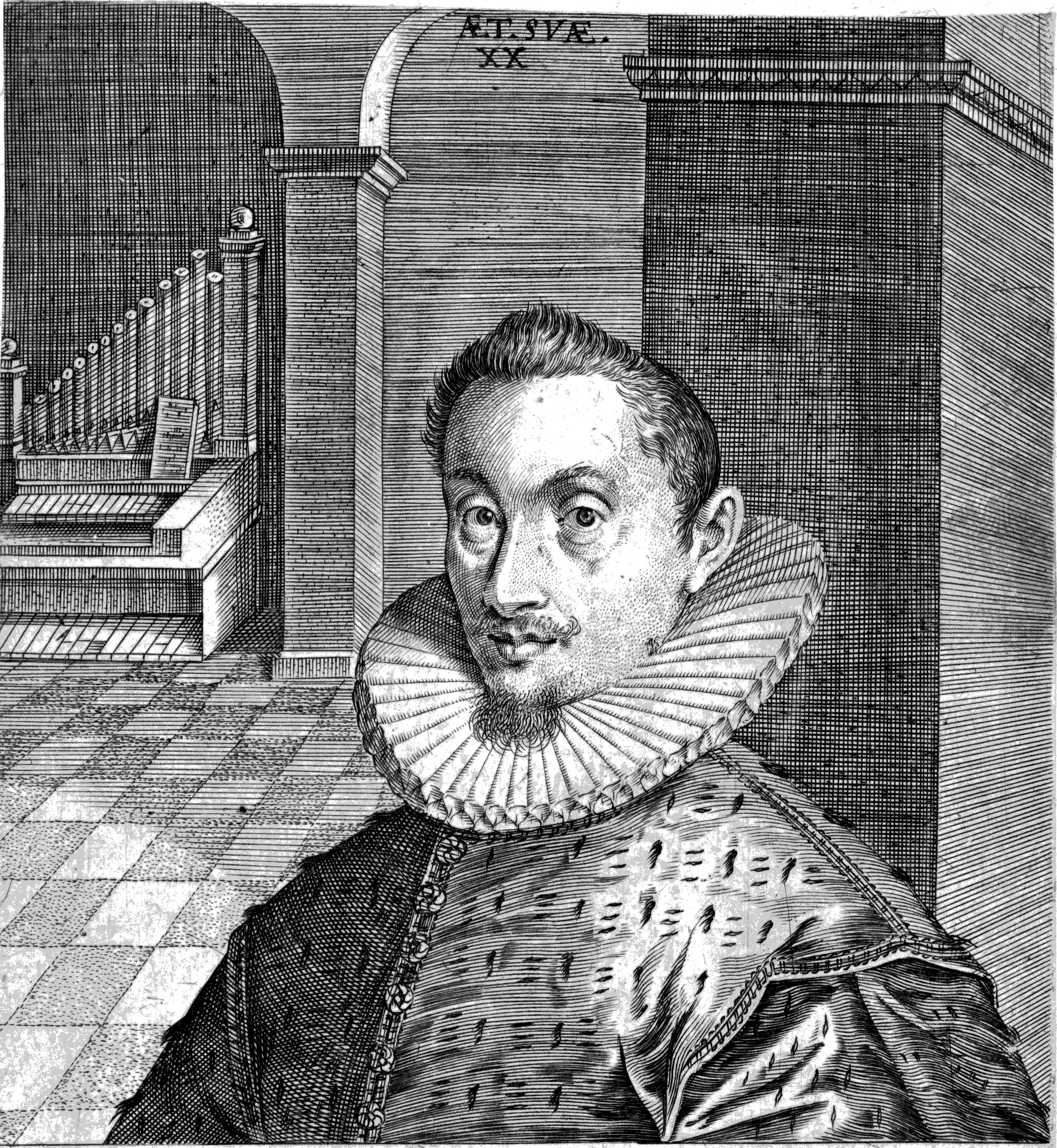
- Engraving of Hassler, 1593
- Text: John 1:14
- Language: Latin
- Published: 1591
- Scoring: SSATTB

"Verbum caro factum est" ("The Word became flesh") is a sacred motet for six voices by Hans Leo Hassler. The Latin text is taken from the prologue to the Gospel of John. The voices are divided into two groups of three that sing antiphonally in the Venetian polychoral style. The motet is often performed for Christmas, in services, concerts and on recordings. Instruments can play along with the voices, and it has been arranged for instruments alone.

== History ==
Hans Leo Hassler studied in Venice with Andrea Gabrieli, and was a musician for the Fugger family in Augsburg. He composed "Verbum caro factum est" as a six-voice motet and published it in his collection Cantiones sacrae in 1591.

== Text and music ==
The Latin text is taken from the Bible, John 1:14, which became a responsory for Matins and a processional responsory for the Mass on Christmas Day. The topic is the incarnation. The verse reads in the World English version: "The Word became flesh, and lived among us. We saw his glory, such glory as of the one and only Son of the Father, full of grace and truth."

In the Venetian polychoral style that Hassler learned in Venice, the voices are often divided into two interacting groups, one of higher voices (SSA), the other of lower voices (TTB); they sound combined at "climactic moments" of the text. At the end of the composition, the texture changes rapidly between three-part and six-part sonorities, described as "almost rhapsodic".

The music has been arranged for instrumental performance, such as organ intabulations in North German style by Heinrich Scheidemann and Delphin Strungk. There is also a version for various brass ensembles available for sale by Hummingbird Music.

== Recordings ==
The motet has been recorded in programs for Christmas by choirs and vocal ensembles. Georg Ratzinger conducted the Regensburger Domspatzen in a 1983 recording called Weihnachtskonzert (Christmas concert), and Reinhard Kammlinger the Augsburger Domsingknaben in 1994. It was recorded for a collection Christmas by The Gesualdo Six conducted by Owain Park in 2019, and by the London Oratory School Schola conducted by Charles Cole in 2020.
