= Rora, Aberdeenshire =

Coordinates: 57.545°N 1.901°W

Rora: Scottish Gaelic: Ròrath
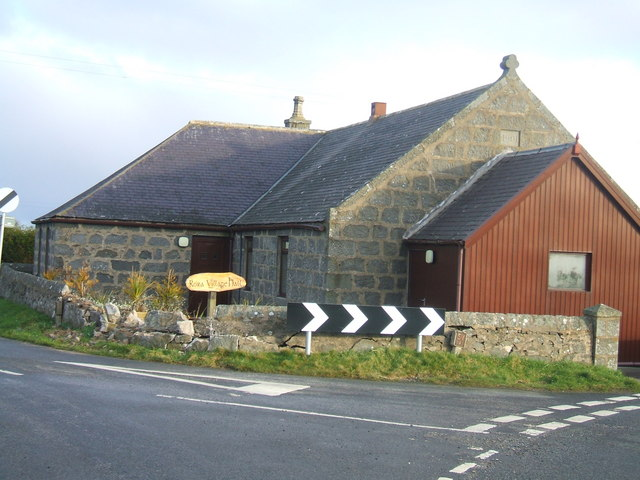
- Rora Village Hall

- Location within Aberdeenshire
- OS grid reference: NK060505
- Council area: Aberdeenshire
- Lieutenancy area: Aberdeenshire
- Country: Scotland
- Sovereign state: United Kingdom
- Post town: PETERHEAD
- Postcode district: AB42
- Dialling code: 01779
- Police: Scotland
- Fire: Scottish
- Ambulance: Scottish
- UK Parliament: Aberdeenshire North and Moray East
- Scottish Parliament: Banffshire and Buchan Coast

Rora (Scottish Gaelic: Ròrath) is a rural settlement in the Buchan area of Aberdeenshire, Scotland, situated 8.3 kilometres (5.2 mi) north-west of Peterhead and lying to the north of the River Ugie.

== Rora Moss ==
Rora Moss, a Site of Special Scientific Interest, is an area of raised peat bog lying to the north-west of the village. The area has been heavily drained and subject to domestic and commercial peat cutting.

== People from Rora ==
- Thomas Arbuthnot (Senior), pioneer of commercial kelp manufacture (1681–1762)
- Charles Arbuthnot, abbot and mathematician (1737–1820)
