= Jon Hassler Theater =

Coordinates: 44°9′55″N 92°10′18.5″W

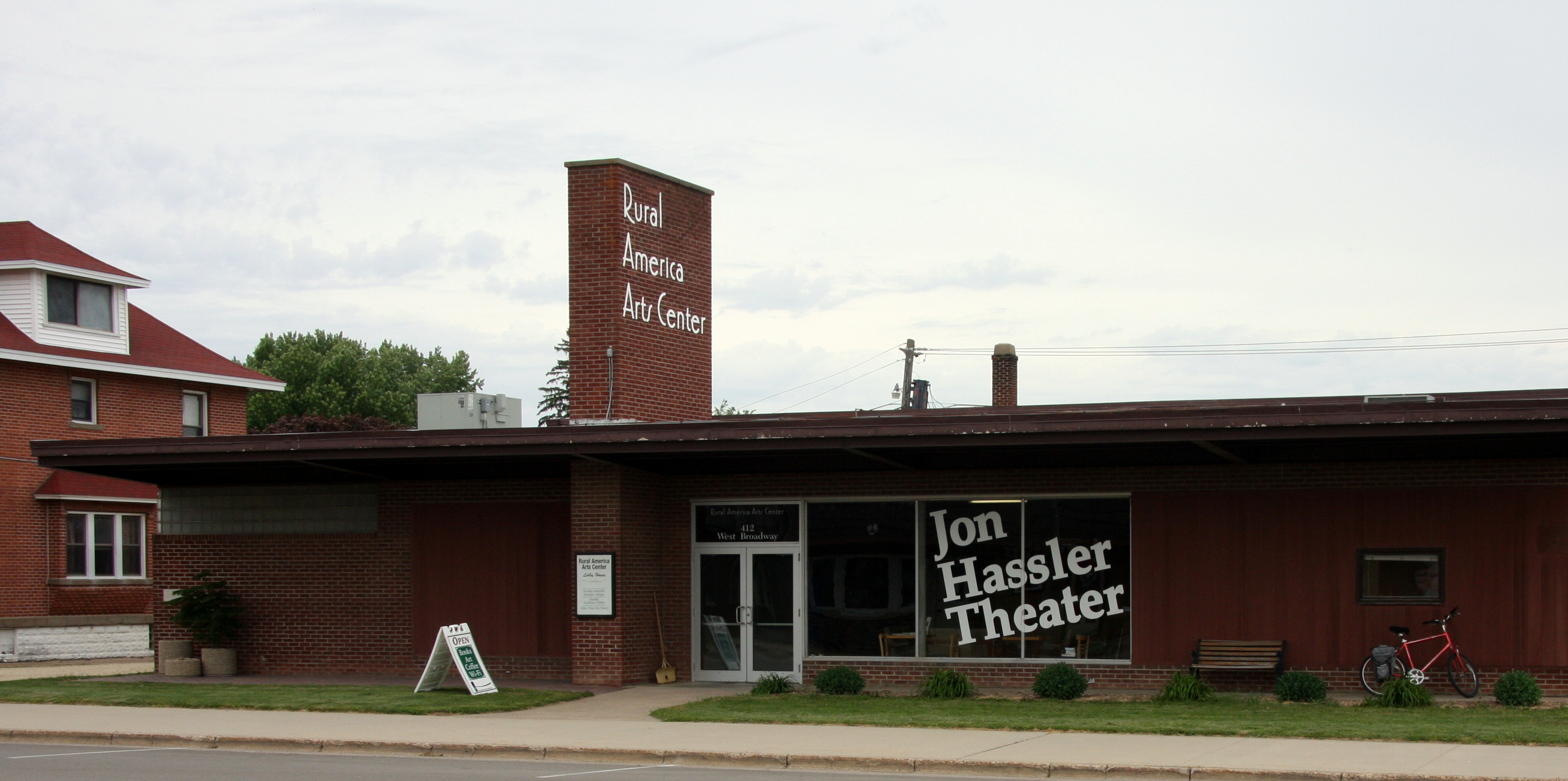
The Jon Hassler Theater and Rural America Arts Center in 2014

The Jon Hassler Theater was a professional live theater located in Plainview, Minnesota. In November 2013 it was announced that the Hassler would be closing at the end of 2014.

== History ==
In 1999 the International Harvester Implement building was purchased by the Rural American Arts Partnership to become the theater itself. Back in 1985, the Lyric Theatre was founded by Sally Childs, who would later become the artistic director of the Jon Hassler Theater. Then, in 1999, the Lyric Theater started holding shows at the Hassler, and in 2000 the Lyric Theater moved its headquarters down to the Hassler. The theater was named after local author Jon Hassler.

== Seasons ==
1999 - Old Man Brunner Country, adapted by Ron Duffy from Leo Dangel; The Staggerford Murders by Jon Hassler; both shows produced by Lyric Theater and brought to Plainview as touring productions.

2000 - Grand Opening by Jon Hassler; To Whom It May Concern by Carol Hall; On Golden Pond by Ernest Thompson; Gifts of the Magi by Mark St. Germain and Randy Courts.

2001 - Old Man Brunner Country, adapted by Ron Duffy from Leo Dangel; Chin Music by John Calvin Rezmerski; Boxelder Bug Variations, adapted by Sally Childs from Bill Holm; Simon's Night by Jon Hassler; The Fantasticks by Tom Jones and Harvey Schmidt; Grace and Glorie by Tom Ziegler; Grand Opening by Jon Hassler.

2002 - Talley's Folly by Lanford Wilson; Dear James, adapted by Sally Childs from Jon Hassler; Honk! The Ugly Duckling Musical by George Stiles and Anthony Drewe; Morning's at Seven by Paul Osborn; How to Talk Minnesotan the Holiday Musical by Howard Mohr and Drew Jansen (co-produced by Troupe America, Inc.).

2003 - The Spitfire Grill by James Valcq and Fred Alley (co-production with Buffalo Gal); The Staggerford Murders by Jon Hassler; How to Talk Minnesotan the Summer Musical by Howard Mohr and Drew Jansen (co-produced by Troupe America, Inc.); Honk! The Ugly Duckling Musical by George Stiles and Anthony Drewe, Driving Miss Daisy by Alfred Uhry; My Way: A Musical Tribute to Frank Sinatra by David Grapes and Todd Olson.

2004 - Proof by David Auburn; And the World Goes 'Round: The Songs of Kander & Ebb; The Drawer Boy by Michael Healy; The West Side Waltz by Ernest Thompson; Guys on Ice: the Ice Fishing Musical by Fred Alley and James Kaplan (co-produced by Troupe America, Inc.).

2005 - The Odd Couple by Neil Simon; Seascape by Edward Albee; Bordertown Café by Kelly Rebar; Pump Boys and Dinettes by John Foley, Mark Hardwick, Debra Monk, Cass Morgan, John Schimmel and Jim Wann (co-produced with Mainstage Management.)

2006 - Trick Boxing by Brian Sostek & Megan McClellan; Rounding Third by Richard Dresser; The Last Five Years by Jason Robert Brown (a co-production with Nautilus Music-Theater); Rookery Blues by Jon Hassler (adapted for stage by Sally Child); Jacob Marley's Christmas Carol by Tom Mula (the one man version); The Pillowman by Martin McDonagh.

2007 - Grand Opening by Jon Hassler (adapted for stage by Sally Childs); Mercy of a Storm by Jeffrey Hatcher; Tuesdays with Morrie by Jeffrey Hatcher and Mitch Albom; Jacob Marley's Christmas Carol by Tom Mula (the four-person version).

2008 - Good Doctor by Neil Simon; The Hassler Summer Sampler; Enchanted April by Matthew Barber; Don't Hug Me by Phil Olson.

2009 - Dear James by Jon Hassler (adapted for stage by Sally Childs); The Hassler Summer Sampler; Leaving Iowa by Tim Clue and Spike Manton; A Don't Hug Me Christmas Carol by Phil Olson.

2010 - Old Man Brunner Country by Leo Dangel (adapted for stage by Sally Childs); A Don't Hug Me County Fair by Phil Olson, The Legend of Sleepy Hollow by Washington Irving.

== Staff ==
**As of November 2013**

- Dean Harrington - CEO
- Sally Harrington - House Manager/Facilities

Previous staff members and other important people of the Hassler Theater include: Clark Cruikshank; Sam Goerss; Ben Hain; Sally Childs; Paul Epton; Paul Skattum; Mike Carter; Ian Norregaard; Carter Martin; Tracy van Eijl; Sunny Hartert; Erica Zaffarano; Mike Nadolske; Alva Crom; and Tim, Gina, and Taylor Craine.

== Words and After Words ==
In 2006 the Jon Hassler Theater opened up a book store in the lobby of the theater called Words and After Words. The majority of the books were donated by Emilio DeGrazia, a published author and professor emeritus from Winona State University.

== High school Show ==
As of 2003, the Hassler has collaborated with the Plainview High School to put on the school's yearly show. From 2003 to 2006 Sally Childs directed these shows. In 2007 to 2010 the show was directed by English teacher Tracy Olson Moran due to Childs having previous engagements. This also marked the changing of the technicians for the show. Lighting director/designer Ben Hain, and set designer/builder Erica Zaffarano had moved on to other theaters and were replaced by longtime Hassler technicians Mike Carter and Ian Norregaard. In 2011 Moran decided to step down from directing stating that she'd like to spend more time with her family. The yearly show is now directed by current choir director Linda Theisen. In 2012 the yearly show was split into a Varsity and a Junior Varsity (JV) show with the 2011-12 show being directed by former choir director Andrew Faller and the 2012–13 and 2013-14 shows being directed by local parent and theater enthusiast Kim Lange. Before the announcement of the Hassler's closing, Carter and Norregaard announced that after the 2013-2014 shows that they would no longer be involved with the high school's shows due to the demands of their full-time jobs and starting their own families. The high school has put on a variety of shows.

- 2003 - The Miracle Worker
- 2004 - The Rememberer
- 2005 - You're A Good Man Charlie Brown
- 2006 - Little Women
- 2007 - The Curious Savage
- 2008 - The Wizard of Oz
- 2009 - South Pacific
- 2010 - a 'rewritten' version of A Midsummer Night's Dream
- 2011 - Back to the 80's
- 2012 - Ever After, JV
- 2012 - Once Upon a Mattress
- 2012-13 - Fussin an' a'Feudin', JV
- 2013 - How to Succeed in Business Without Really Trying
- 2013-14 - Guess What I Did Last Summer, JV
- 2014 - Happy Days

== The Hassler House ==
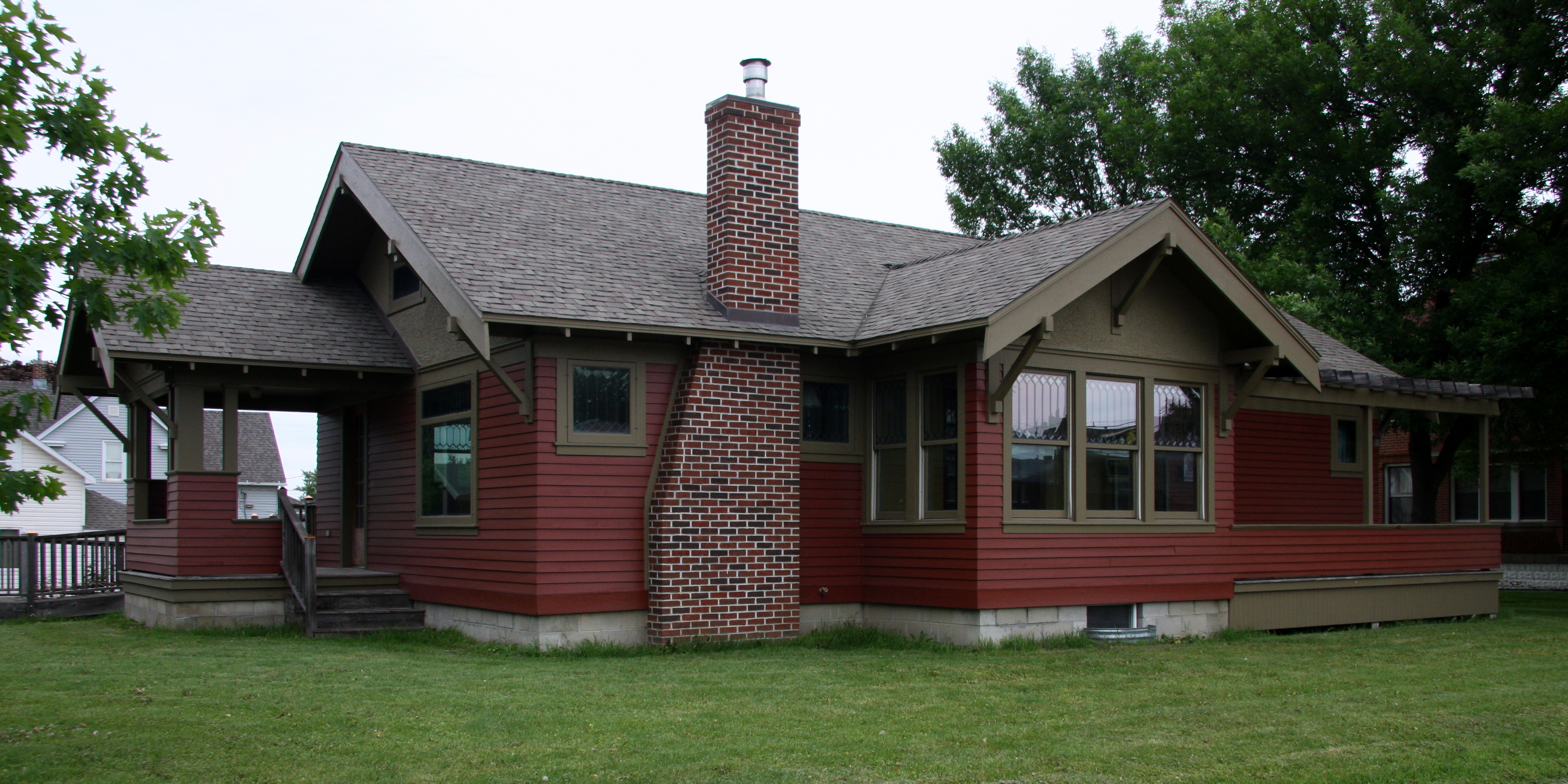
The Hassler House

In 2004 Jon Hassler's second childhood home in Plainview was moved onto the same block as the Hassler Theater. It was restored and refurnished. It is now used to hold meetings for the Hassler Theater's Writers Center and to house actors during the runs of shows.

== Trivia ==
- Louie Anderson performed at the Hassler in 2005.
- The theater used to seat 230 patrons.
- The ticket and refreshment counters were set pieces from previous shows.
- With the exception of one house, the Hassler's property took up an entire quarter of a block.
- The Hassler was a member of the Rural American Arts Partnership (RAAP) along with the Writers Center, the Watson House and the Plainview Area History Center, which is actually a refurbished church.

The show times were as follows:

- Thursdays - 1:30 p.m.*Thursday matinees were subject to change and are not held every Thursdays* and 7:30 p.m.
- Fridays - 7:30 p.m.
- Saturdays - 7:30 p.m.
- Sundays - 1:30 p.m.

Standard ticket prices (as of July 2013) were: $22 for General Admission $21 for Mayo Clinic $20 for Seniors (62+) $19 for Red Hat Groups $14 for Students and Children (up to age 25)

The first showing of most shows at the Hassler, also known as preview night shows, cost $14 for every one and all Thursday evening shows were $14 for everyone.

As of their 2008 season, the Hassler Theater replaced what would have been their second show of the season with the "Hassler Summer Sampler," which is composed of various acts over the span of roughly two months. The 2008 sampler included: The Rochester Radio Theater Guild, The Sweet Adalines, The Mary Louise Knutson Jazz Trio, Women Who Drink, and "The Very Thought of You" a tribute to Jon Hassler himself who had died earlier that year. The Summer sampler was held again in 2009, this time consisting of Boxelder Bugs Variations A Tribute to Bill Holm (who had died), Wise Cracks From My Father, What I Want to be When I Grow Up! and Revelations of Mann. The Summer Sampler was not shown in the 2010 season, instead the Hassler only had three shows.

== Closure ==
Starting in 2011 the Hassler started to transition away from producing their own productions and started renting out their space to other theater groups. In November 2013 it was announced that the Jon Hassler Theater would be closing at the end of 2014. According to CEO Dean Harrington, "The kind of theater that our arts mission calls us to produce certainly has a following in our area but not enough to make the program worthwhile." The 'kind of theater' that Harrington refers to is the main reason for the closure as a very limited audience attended the shows in comparison to the more family friendly comedies and musicals the Hassler produced earlier in its lifetime. This agenda of pushing 'art' onto the Plainview locals ultimately was the beginning of the end as many of them felt spurned after the promise of the Hassler being a community theater quickly changed to the Hassler being nothing but a 'professional theater'.
