= Jakob Hassler =

German Renaissance composer (1569–1622)

Jakob Hassler (18 December 1569 – 1 January 1622) was a German Renaissance composer.

== Life ==
He was born in Nuremberg, Germany, the youngest son of Isaak Hassler, and brother of Hans Leo Hassler and Kasper Hassler. The Hasslers were an important Franco-Flemish musical family in Middle Europe during the late Renaissance. Baptized in Nuremberg, Jakob was initially instructed in music, like his brothers, by his father Isaak.

Hassler is first identified on the rolls of musicians in Augsburg in 1585, and he was ennobled, along with his two brothers, by Holy Roman Emperor Rudolf II in 1595. In between, Hassler is believed to have traveled to Italy to study at the behest of the aristocratic Fugger family, possibly with Andrea Gabrieli. Hassler's term in the Fugger household was interrupted when he was thrown in jail for impregnating an Augsburg girl named Leonora Ostermair; Hassler was released on bail to marry her on 17 February 1597. In May, Hassler accepted a post in the prestigious court of Count Eitel Friedrich IV of Hohenzollern-Hechingen. In 1600, Hassler published his book of madrigals, which spread his popularity; certain madrigals from this publication appeared in collections printed throughout Europe. Dogged by a second paternity suit in Hechingen that was later dismissed, Hassler attempted to succeed his brother Hans Leo in Augsburg. Luckily, Hassler was offered a post in the Imperial Chapel in Prague instead. In 1604, Rudolf II bestowed the honorific of "von Roseneckh" on Hassler, and Hassler's descendants, among them author and composer Gerd von Hassler, continue to observe this title.

The years until Rudolf II died in 1612 proved Hassler's most prosperous—in 1608 Hassler picked up a second appointment at the monastery of Heiligkreuz in Augsburg. When Hassler's second son was born in 1609, Rudolf II was named as his godfather. Both Rudolf II and Hans Leo died in 1612, and by 1616, the Imperial Chapel owed Hassler more than 1,000 florins on his salary. In 1618, Emperor Matthias died, and in 1619, not long after the Defenestration of Prague, Bohemia revolted against Matthias' successor, Ferdinand II, setting in motion the events that ultimately began the Thirty Years' War. Hassler did not long survive them. He died in Prague, having last picked up his salary payment on 23 April 1621; the next time they were received, on 29 September 1622, the receipt was signed by the composer's widow, Leonora Hassler.

Although Hassler's vocal works were highly regarded in their day and remain the most extensive part of his overall catalog, they are little studied and Grove dubs them "unremarkable." Nevertheless, Hassler's seven surviving keyboard works, consisting of three ricercars, a toccata, a fugue, fantasy, and a canzona, are of seminal importance as they seamlessly combine Venetian, German, and Franco-Flemish practices under one roof.
