= Kasper Hassler =

German organist and composer (1562–1618)

Kasper or Caspar Hassler (17 August 1562, Nuremberg – 21 June 1618, Nuremberg) was a German organist and composer. He was the son of the organist Isaak Hassler and the brother of the musicians Jakob Hassler and Hans Leo Hassler.

== Life ==
Unlike his brothers, Kasper remained in Nuremberg all his life. In 1586 he became organist at the Egidienkirche, succeeding Hans Haidens, but he was replaced himself in 1587 by Wilhelm Endels at Sankt Lorenz. From 1616 until his death he worked as an organist at St. Sebaldus Church, one of the most prestigious posts in the city. He also worked alongside his brother Hans Leo in the silver and copper mining trade for the first decade of the 17th century.

Though a composer himself, he is mainly notable in the history of music for his publishing work, producing valuable collections of music by Italian and German composers and thus helped to introduce and spread Italian prima prattica to Germany. He was also known to give advice on organs and probably also worked as an organ restorer.

== Sources ==
- http://www.deutsche-biographie.de/sfz31788.html
- http://www.bmlo.lmu.de/Q/GND=132950065
