= Johann Georg Hasler =

Johann Georg Hasler may refer to:

- Johann Georg Hasler (politician, born 1822), Mayor of Gamprin, Liechtenstein
- Johann Georg Hasler (politician, born 1826), member of the Landtag of Liechtenstein and Mayor of Eschen
- Johann Georg Hasler (politician, born 1895), member of the Landtag of Liechtenstein and Mayor of Eschen
- Johann Georg Hasler (politician, born 1898), member of the Landtag of Liechtenstein and Mayor of Gamprin
