= Charles Arbuthnot (abbot) =

Scottish abbot (1737–1820)

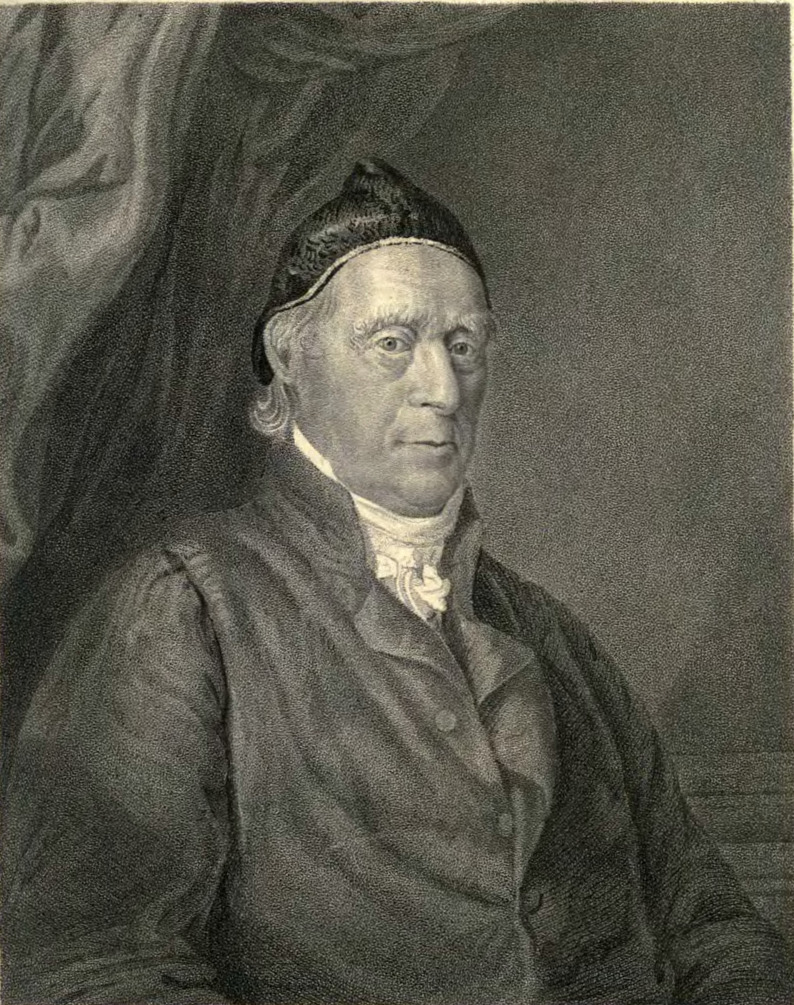
- Born: 22 February 1737; Rora
- Died: 19 April 1820 (aged 83); Regensburg
- Position held: abbot

Charles Arbuthnot (5 March [O.S. 22 February] 1737 – 19 April 1820) was a renowned Scottish abbot of the Scots Monastery, Regensburg, and a leading Bavarian mathematician of his time.

== Biography ==
The son of James Arbuthnot, Senior of West Rora in Aberdeenshire and Margaret Gordon, he was baptized in Longside on 6 March [O.S. 23 February] 1737. He was raised in the Roman Catholic faith and sent to Germany at age 11 for his education. He afterwards gained a reputation as a scientist, mathematician, natural philosopher, and chemist, and was also renowned for his piety, learning, breadth of mind, and benevolence of heart. In 1757, Arbuthnot became a member of the Benedictine Order and a member of the Monastery of St James, known as the Scots College at Regensburg. Under the name Benedict, he spent the rest of his life at Regensburg, other than a brief visit to Scotland in 1772. His father died in 1770, and he refused his share in his estate.

On 4 June 1776, Arbuthnot became abbot of the Scots Monastery. He was greatly respected, and when in 1802 the Eternal Diet of Regensburg determined at the instance of Napoleon Bonaparte to secularize all the church lands of the Empire, an express exemption was made in favour of the Scots Monastery at Regensburg, although it was not allowed to take any new novices. Arbuthnot had declared the monastery a Scottish national shrine and put it under the sole authority of Rome. In 1814, it came under the authority of the Bishop of Regensburg, but it was still not dissolved, since the monastery had laid out a large part of its fortune at an Austrian bank, which the state did not want to lose. After Arbuthnot's death, the monastery was demoted to a priory because of a staff shortage, and in 1862 its existence was at last brought to an end, when the premises were bought by the Bavarian government.

According to Charles Arbuthnot's tombstone at Regensburg he was born at Rora on 5 March 1737, made his profession (professus) on 21 November 1756 and became a priest on 14 February 1761.
