= St. James's Abbey, Würzburg =

Former monastery in Würzburg, Germany

Coordinates: 49°47′44″N 9°55′14″E

St. James's Abbey (German: St. Jakob zu den Schotten) was a Benedictine monastery in Würzburg. It was founded as a Scottish monastery by Embrico, Bishop of Würzburg, about 1134.

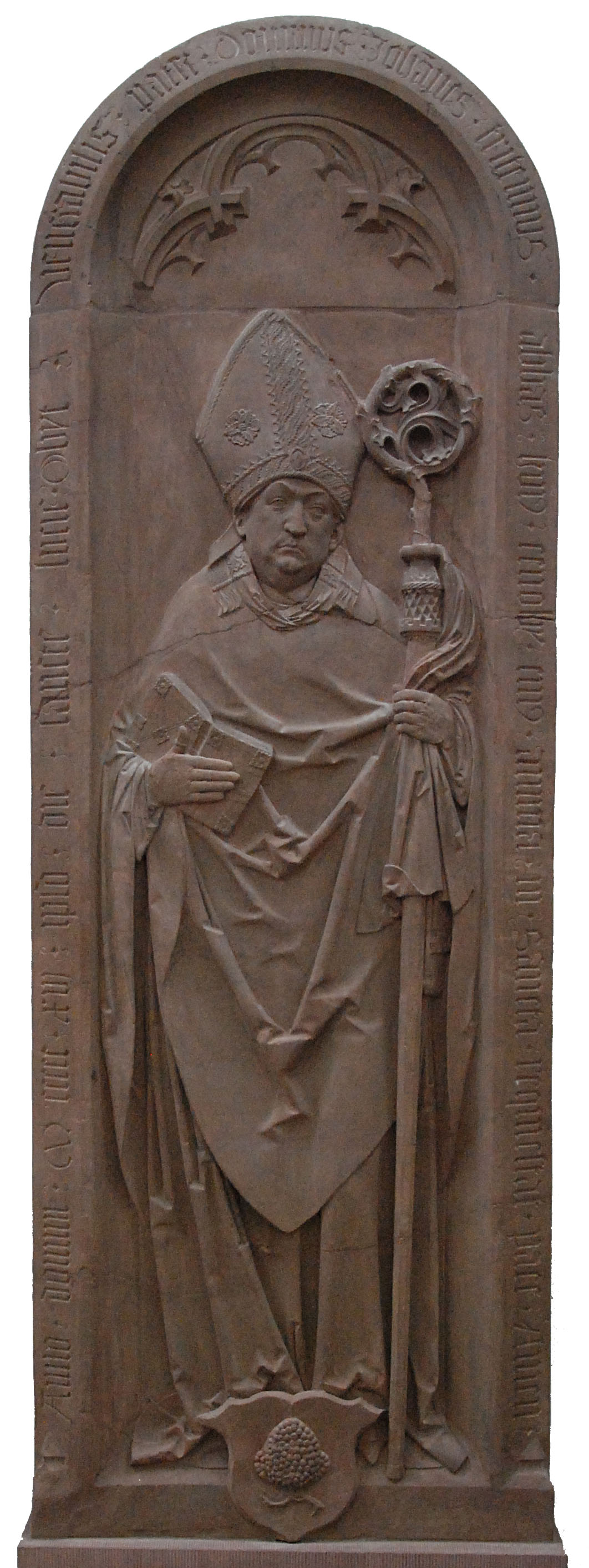
Tomb Relief of Johannes Trithemius by Tilman Riemenschneider formerly at St. James's Abbey. In 1825 the tombstone was moved to the Neumünster church.

== History ==
Its first abbot was Macarius Scotus (1139–53) who with a few other monks had come from the Scots Monastery of St. Jacob at Ratisbon. In 1146 he went to Rome to obtain relics and indulgences for his monastery. He died in 1153, and is honoured as a saint. His feast is celebrated on 24 January.

The monks at St. James's were all Irish or Scottish until 1497, when their number dwindled to one or two. The abbey was then given over to German monks, and in 1506 was united with the Bursfeld Congregation. From 1506–16 Johannes Trithemius was its abbot. In 1547 the whole monastery had died out, and its revenues went to the Bishop of Würzburg.

Upon the request of John Whyte, Abbot of the Scottish Monastery at Ratisbon, it was again restored to the Scottish monks by Bishop Julius in 1595, and prospered for some time. Its last abbot, Placidus Hamilton, who, though very learned, lacked the qualities of a good ruler, resigned and retired to London in 1763. From that time till its secularization in 1803 it was ruled by priors. At its secularization it numbered eight monks. The complex became the Garrison Hospital (Standortlazarett) and in 1904, the sanctuary became the garrison church. Subsequent to the bombing at the end of World War II, in 1945, the church was rebuilt and dedicated to St. John Bosco. It is now called "Don-Bosco-Kirche".

== List of abbots ==
- Macarius Scotus, 1139–53;
- Christian, 1153–79;
- Eugene, 1179–97;
- Gregory, 1197–1207;
- Matthew, 1207–15;
- Teclan, 1215–17;
- Elias I, 1217–23;
- Celestine, 1223–34;
- Gerard, 1234–42;
- John I, 1242–53;
- John II, 1253–74;
- Maurice I, 1274–98;
- Joel, 1298–1306;
- Elias II, 1306–18;
- John III, 1318–35;
- Michaeas, 1335–41;
- Rynaldus, 1342;
- Philip I, 1342–61;
- Donaldus, 1361–?, d. 1385;
- Henry, 1379;
- Maurice II, 1381?–88?;
- Timothy, 1388?–99;
- Imar, 1399–1409?;
- Rutger, 1409?–17;
- Thomas I, 1417–37;
- Roricus, 1437–47;
- Alanus, 1447–55;
- Maurice III, 1455–61;
- John IV, 1461–3;
- Otto, 1463–5;
- Thaddeus, 1465–74;
- David, 1474–83;
- Thomas II, 1483–94;
- Edmund, 1494–7;
- Philip II, 1497.

These were followed by five German abbots:

- Kilian Crispus, 1504–6;
- Trithemius, 1506–16;
- Matthias, 1516–35;
- Erhard Jani, 1535–42;
- Michael Stephan, 1542–7.

From its restoration to the Scottish monks in 1595 the following were its abbots:

- Richard Irvin, 1595–8;
- John Whyte, at the same time Abbot of the Scotch monastery at Ratisbon, 1598–1602;
- Francis Hamilton, 1602–14;
- William Ogilbay, 1615–35;
- Robert Forbes, 1636–7;
- Audomarus Asloan, 1638–61;
- Maurus Dixon, 1661–79;
- Bernard Maxwell, 1679–85;
- Marianus Irvin, 1685–8;
- Ambrose Cook, 1689–1703;
- Augustine Bruce, who ruled as prior during 1703–13, and as abbot during 1713–16;
- Maurus Strachan, 1716–37;
- Augustine Duffus de Fochaber, 1739–53;
- Placidus Hamilton, 1756–63.
