= Isaak Hassler =

German organist and music teacher

Isaak Hassler (c. 1530, in St. Joachimsthal – 14 July 1591, in Nuremberg) was a German Lutheran organist and music teacher, mainly active in Nuremberg. He is also notable as the father of the musicians Jakob Hassler, Hans Leo Hassler and Kasper Hassler.
