= Jon Hassler =

American novelist and educator

- Born: March 30, 1933; Minneapolis, Minnesota, U.S.
- Died: March 20, 2008 (aged 74); St. Louis Park, Minnesota, U.S.
- Occupations: Writer, educator

Academic background
- Education: St. John's University (BA); University of North Dakota (MA)

Academic work
- Institutions: St. John's University; Brainerd Community College; Bemidji State University
- Writing career
- Notable work: Staggerford

Jon Hassler (March 30, 1933 – March 20, 2008) was an American writer and teacher known for his novels about small-town life in Minnesota. He held the positions of Regents professor emeritus and writer-in-residence at St. John's University in Collegeville, Minnesota.

== Biography ==
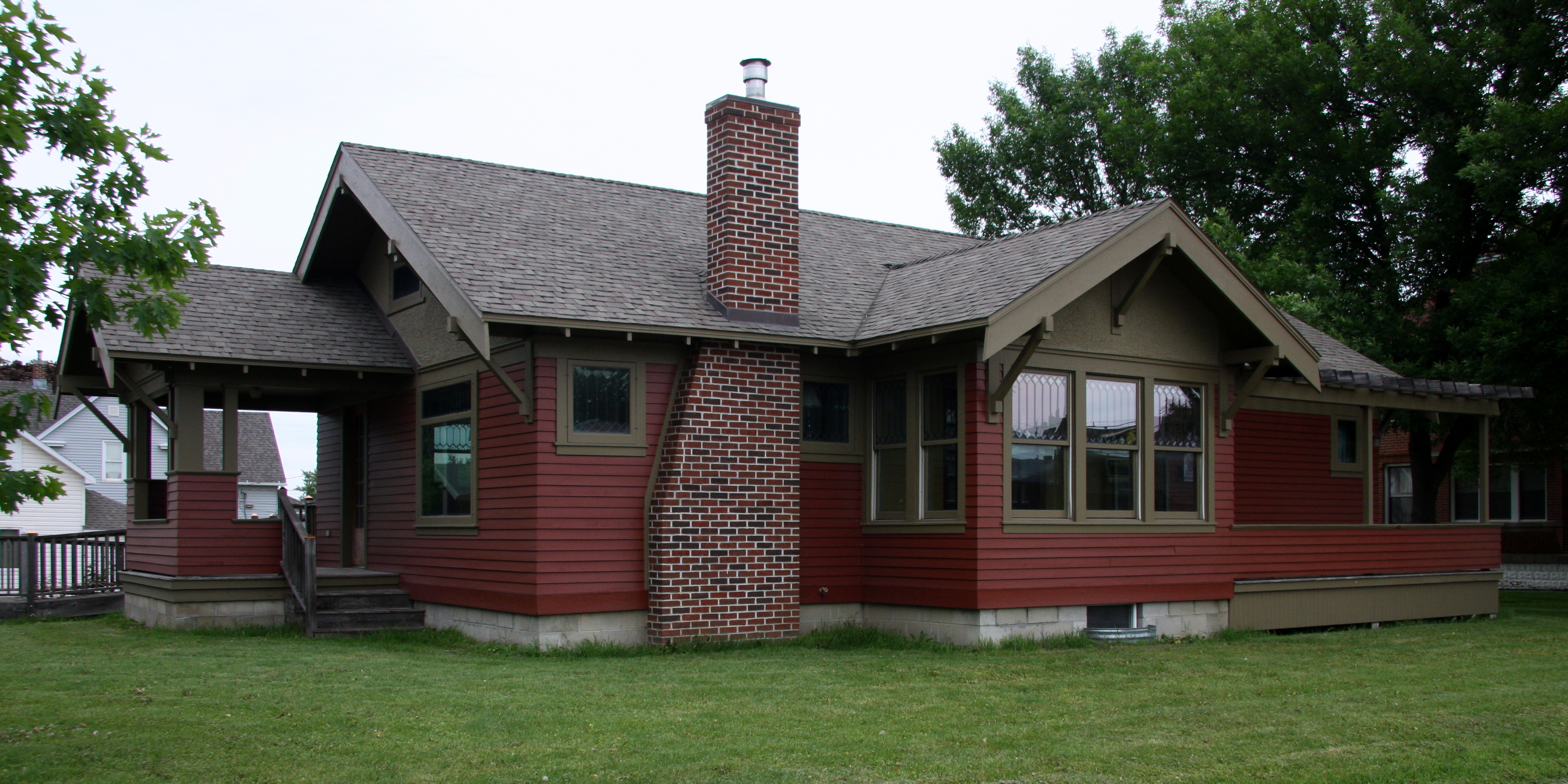
Hassler's boyhood home in Plainview, Minnesota

Hassler was born in Minneapolis on March 30, 1933. He spent his childhood and teen years in the Minnesota towns of Staples and Plainview, where he graduated from high school. He received his Bachelor of Arts degree in English from St. John's University in 1955. While teaching English at three different Minnesota high schools, he received his Master of Arts degree in English from the University of North Dakota in 1960. He continued to teach high school until 1965, when he began his collegiate teaching career: first at Bemidji State University, then Brainerd Community College, and finally at Saint John's, where he became the writer-in-residence in 1980.

During his high-school teaching years, Hassler married and fathered three children. His first marriage lasted 25 years. He had two more marriages, the last to Gretchen Kresl Hassler.

In 1994, Hassler was diagnosed with progressive supranuclear palsy (PSP), a disease similar to Parkinson's. It caused vision and speech problems, as well as difficulty walking, but he was able to continue writing. He was reported to have finished a novel just days before his death. Hassler died in 2008, at the age of 74, at Methodist Hospital in St. Louis Park, Minnesota. The Jon Hassler Theater in Plainview is named for him. In 2021, his memoir Days Like Smoke was published posthumously.

== Works ==
Much of Hassler's fiction involves characters struggling with transitions in their lives or searching for a central purpose. Many of his major characters are Catholic (or lapsed Catholics), and his novels frequently explore the role small-town life plays in shaping or limiting human potential.

Hassler's novels have several recurring characters, including Miles Pruitt (the protagonist in Staggerford, who is referred to in A Green Journey, The Love Hunter, and The New Woman); Agatha McGee (in Staggerford, A Green Journey, Dear James, The Staggerford Flood, and The New Woman); Larry Quinn (in The Love Hunter and Rookery Blues); and Frank Healy (in North of Hope and The New Woman).

=== Novels ===
- Staggerford (1977)
- Simon's Night (1979)
- The Love Hunter (1981)
- A Green Journey (1985)
- Grand Opening (1987)
- North of Hope (1990)
- Dear James (1993)
- Rookery Blues (1995)
- The Dean's List (novel) (1998)
- The Staggerford Flood (2002)
- The Staggerford Murders (2004)
- The New Woman (2005)

=== Short story collections ===
- Keepsakes and Other Stories (2000)
- Rufus at the Door and Other Stories (2000)

=== Nonfiction ===
- Saint John's in Pictures - Introduction (1994)
- My Staggerford Journal (1999)
- Good People... from an Author's Life (2001)
- Stories Teachers Tell (2004)
- Days Like Smoke (2021)

=== Children's literature ===
- Four Miles to Pinecone (1977)
- Jemmy (novel) (1980)

=== Anthologized stories ===
- Inheriting the Land, edited by Mark Vinz and Thom Tammaro ("The Undistinguished Poet", 1993)
- Imagining Home, edited by Mark Vinz and Thom Tammaro ("Remembering Houses", 1995)

== Adaptations ==
In 1990, Hassler's novel A Green Journey was adapted as a television movie, The Love She Sought, starring Angela Lansbury and Denholm Elliott.
