= The Rememberer =

Short story by Aimee Bender

"The Rememberer" is a short story by Aimee Bender, first published in fall 1997 issue of the Missouri Review. Later it was published in August 1998, in her anthology, The Girl in the Flammable Skirt.

The short story illustrates the narrator, Annie informing the reader of her lover, Ben, who is, as she says "experiencing reverse evolution." As Ben gets closer to becoming a single-cell organism, Annie reaches her limits. She decides to free Ben into the ocean. The story ends with her forever remembering her lover, hoping that one day he'll come back.

== Plot summary ==
"The Rememberer" opens with two characters, Annie, the narrator and her lover, Ben. She introduces the narrative telling the reader that Ben is re-tracing steps in evolution, first turning into an ape and later into a sea turtle.

As the narrative progresses, Annie reminisces on the last days Ben was human. Ben was an intelligent and somber man, one of the reasons Annie fell in love with him as she said "We'd sit together and be sad and think about being sad and sometimes discuss sadness." She recalls that Ben had once told her that they think too much and unknowingly leave emotion aside. "We're all getting too smart. Our brains are just getting bigger and bigger, and the world dries up and dies when there's too much thought and not enough heart." On his last night of human, Annie and Ben make love, and Annie reassures him by whispering into his ear, "see, we're not thinking...we're not thinking at all." Annie wakes up next morning, discovering that Ben has shifted to an ape . As a caring and loving woman Annie takes the time to care for ape Ben.

After Ben has turned into a sea turtle, Annie returns from work one day and discovers that he has again shifted, now into a salamander in the baking pan. Realizing she cannot take any more of this, Annie decides to let Ben go. She releases Ben the salamander into the ocean, hoping that one day Ben will rise from the shore, as the man "who has been to history and back." In the end, she must wait and remember, as she says, "it is my job to remember."

== Characters ==
=== Annie ===
The narrator of the story, Annie is Ben's lover and by-stander in his devolution. As Ben comments in the narrative, he and Annie "think far too much." She mostly concentrates on other things and lacks imagination. For example, when Annie and Ben have sex for the first time, she leaves the lights on and "concentrated really hard on letting go." Even though Annie does "over-think," she still deeply cares for Ben. This is evidenced when she finds Ben as an ape and has the heart to get to know him.

=== Ben ===
Ben is Annie’s lover and the man who goes through reverse evolution. During the narrative Ben is morbid, which is probably because Ben, like Annie thinks too much; he realizes this and questions it. As Ben says “We’re all getting too smart. Our brains are just getting bigger and bigger, and the world dries up and dies when there’s too much thought and not enough heart.” A day before Ben goes through his reverse evolution track; he realizes that “there is no space for anything but dreaming.” That maybe people should stop thinking all the time and for a while, follow their heart, and dream. It could be assumed, that Ben tried to stop thinking, but for him it was too much. In the end, it seems the only way Ben can finally stop thinking was to regress into primitive forms, “to stop being human.”

== Publication history ==
"The Rememberer" was first published in the fall 1997 issue of the Missouri Review. The story was later published in 1998 by Doubleday as a part of Bender's collection of short stories The Girl in the Flammable Skirt. In addition, the story was included in the Ann Charter's anthology The Story and Its Writer: An Introduction to Short Stories.
