= Scots Monastery, Regensburg =

Former monastery in Germany

Coordinates: 49°01′07″N 12°05′18″E

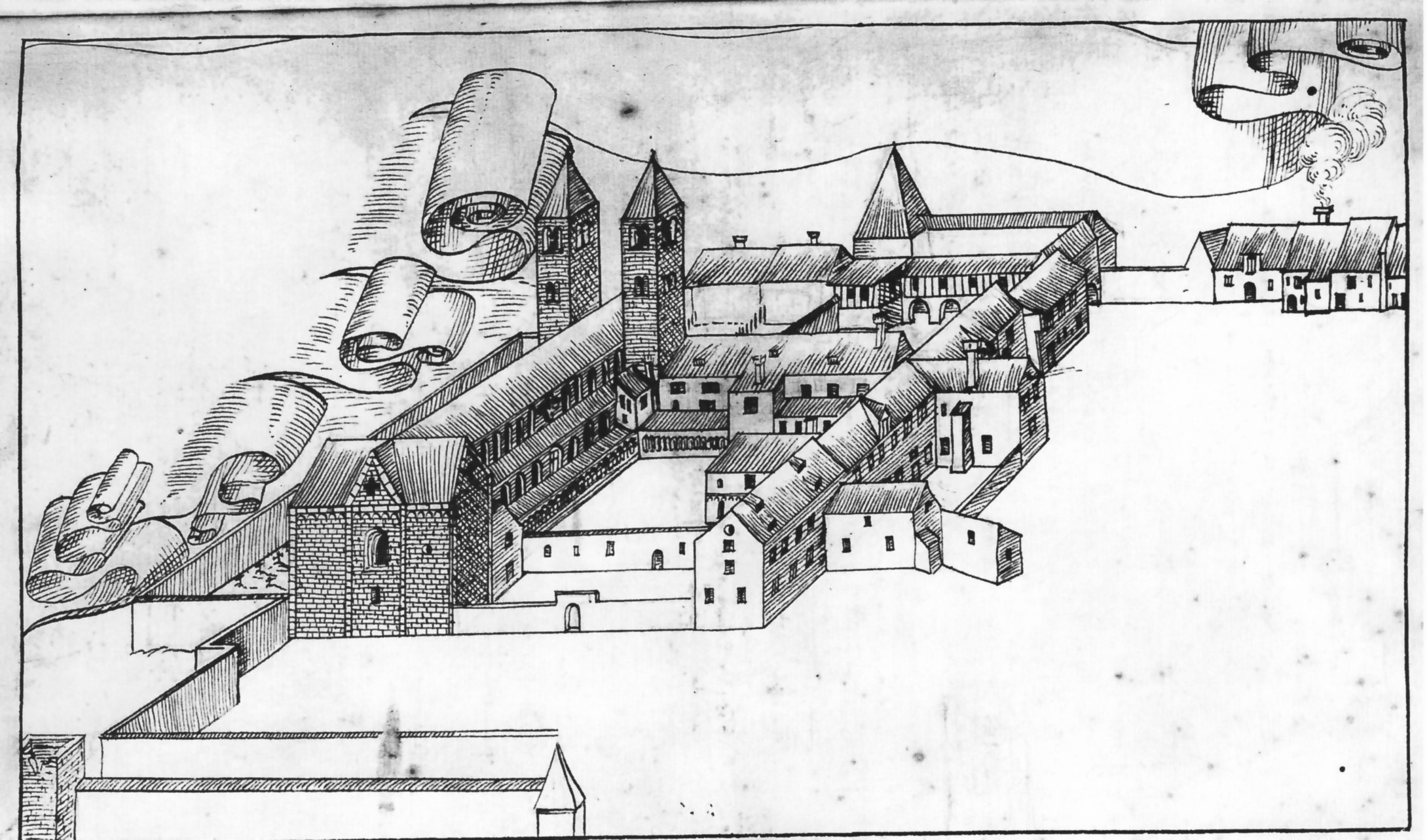
View of the abbey in 1640

The Scots Monastery (in German Schottenkirche, Schottenkloster or Schottenstift) is the former Benedictine Abbey of St James (Jakobskirche) in Regensburg, Germany. It was founded in the 11th century by Irish missionaries and for most of its history was in the hands of first Irish, then Scottish monks. In Middle Latin, Scotti meant Gaels, not differentiating Ireland from Scotland, so that the term Schottenstift dates from the Irish period. The full official name of the actual church, the most prominent building within the abbey complex, is Die irische Benediktinerklosterkirche St. Jakob und St. Gertrud (literally: "The Irish Benedictine Abbey Church of St. James and St. Gertrude").

== Architecture ==
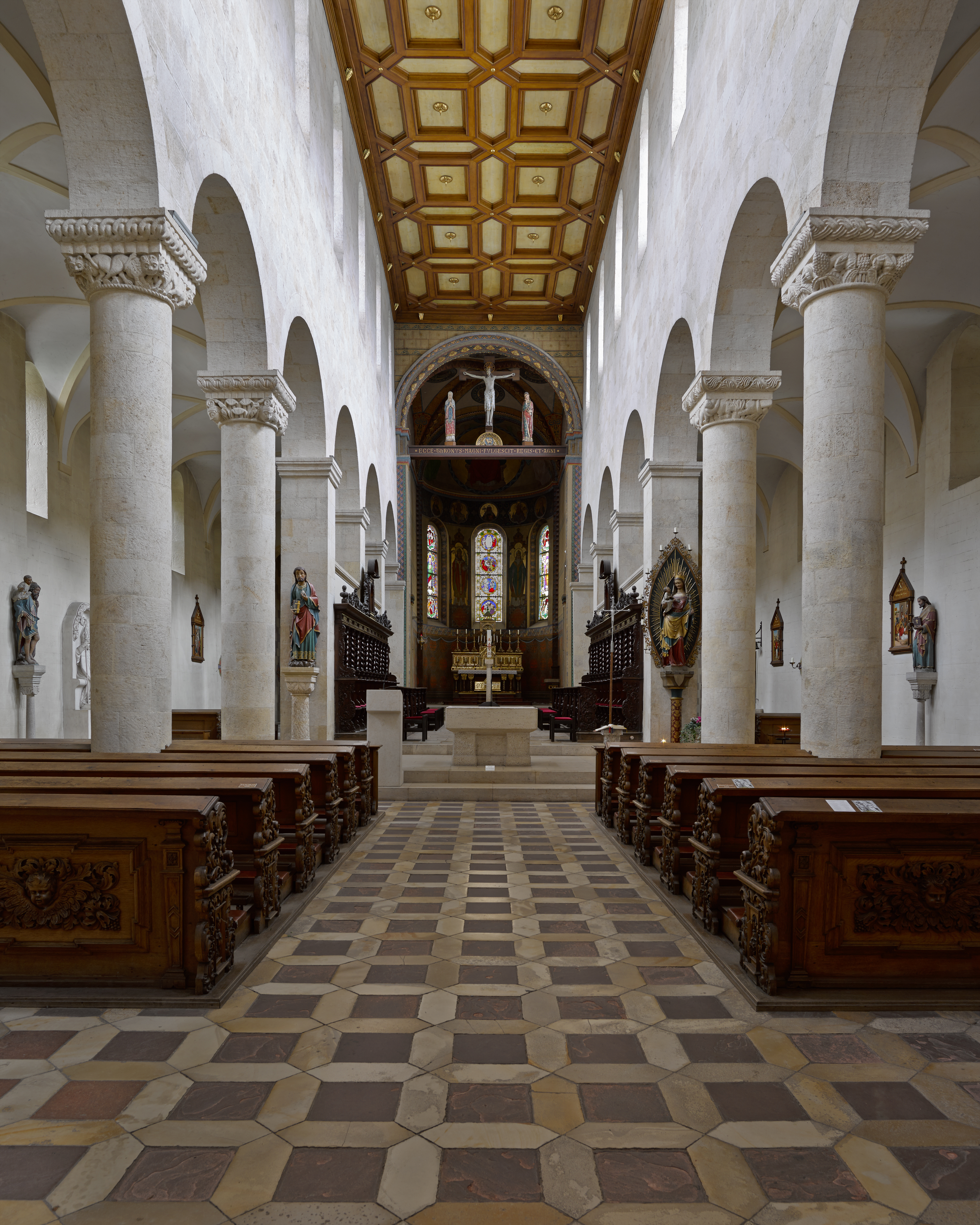
View of the interior facing east

The abbey was originally built to the south of the city walls around the year 1070, but this soon proved to be too small to accommodate the influx of Irish monks. A new site outside of the western city gate was purchased, and construction of a new abbey began around 1100. Around 1300 the city walls were extended and St. James became a part of the fortified city. The new western gate, directly adjacent to the church, became known as the Jakobstor.

This Church of St. James, a three-aisled basilica with three apses and two east towers, was dedicated in 1120. Only the east end of this early building survives.

The monastic church was expanded beginning around 1150, under Abbot Gregor. This second church, which stands today, was given a two-story transept or westwerk at the west end, an elaborate north portal, and a cloister to the south. Construction was completed by about 1185.

Regensburg became an important center for the missionary work of Irish monks in Europe; the Scots Monastery in Vienna is one of its daughter foundations. The St. Jakob monastery had close connections with the monastic school at Cashel back in Ireland and attracted the theologian Honorius of Autun (d.1151) towards the end of his life.

In 1577, shortly after the Scottish Reformation, a papal bull transferred the monastery from Irish to Scottish monks. The monastery was in decline by that time, with only one monk and one novice. The first Scottish abbot was Ninian Winzet (1518–92), an opponent of the reformer John Knox. Mary Queen of Scots ordered Abbot Winzet to train priests for Catholic missionary work in Scotland; the first priests were sent long after his death in 1623.

The monastery managed to avoid dissolution during the Napoleonic period, a rare accomplishment. It was demoted to a priory in 1820, but monks remained in residence until 1862, when the Bavarian government bought the property and turned it into a seminary for training Catholic priests.

The abbey complex consisted of a number of buildings, and the two most significant structures, the church and the cloister, both survive. The cloister is however significantly altered, having been destroyed by fires in 1278 and 1546, and rebuilt between 1866 and 1872. The entire complex was originally surrounded by a wall, which separated a cemetery to the north of the church from the street that led westwards out of the city.

=== Church ===
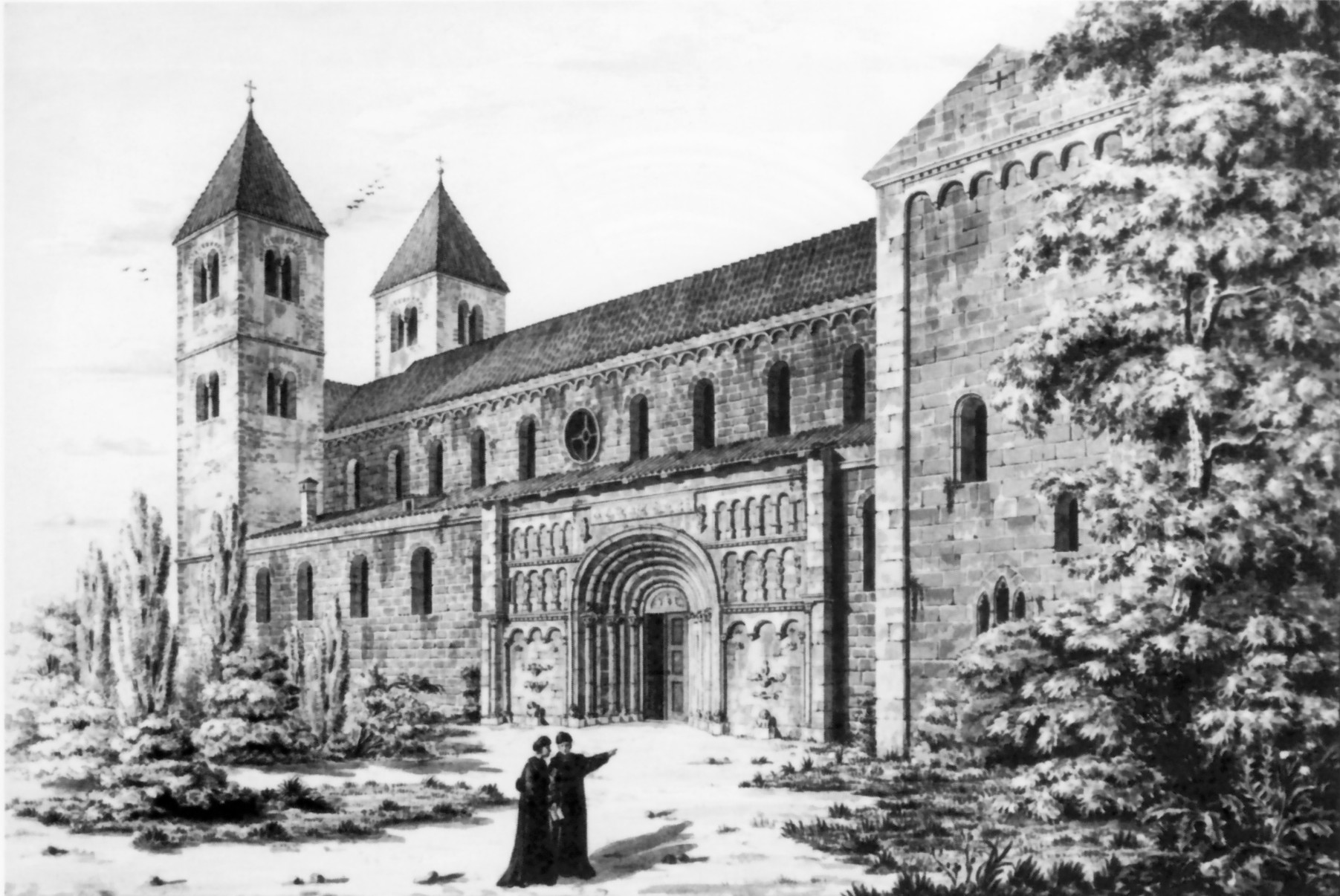
View of the church in 1816

The first abbey church was built at the beginning of the 11th century. It was a three-aisled basilica with three apses. The only portion of this building to survive in full is its eastern end (the apses and the two flanking towers). Traces of the western wall have also been discovered, which indicate that the building was much shorter than the present structure, although of the same width.

A new church, the structure which has substantially survived up to the present day, was constructed at some point between 1175 and 1180. It is an example of Romanesque architecture: a three-aisled basilica with three apses, towers at the east, and a transept at the west. A gallery, in which an organ has since been installed, extends over all three aisles in the transept.

The nave is separated from the aisles by cylindrical masonry pillars (not monolithic columns), whose capitals are fine works of high Romanesque sculpture. Their arrangement indicates forethought, as capitals with botanical decoration alternate with those with figural decoration. The figures include wild men, lions, eagles, and crocodiles, and may have Christological significance. The corners of the pillar bases are decorated with the heads of less noble beasts, including pigs, dogs, donkeys, and vultures.

Under the triumphal arch at the entrance to the central apse stand three wooden sculptures of the late twelfth century, which together form a crucifixion scene. They originally stood on the altar, but were repainted in 1874 and set in their present position in 1893. The apse itself was decorated between 1866 and 1872 by Bavarian and Austrian artists in a Romanesque revival style.

=== Schottenportal ===
The most famous architectural element of the church is its north portal (the Schottenportal), which occupies a full third of the north wall, and is richly decorated with both ornamental and figural sculptures. The proper interpretation of this sculptural program has been debated since the beginning of the 19th century. In the 1990s it was suggested that only the tympanum, archivolt, and jambs formed an original composition of the 12th century, while the remaining portions of the Schottenportal were assembled from spolia during the Renaissance. While this theory would have absolved art historians of the duty of interpreting the program as a unified whole, it has not met with wide acceptance. Indeed, a thorough examination of the structure seems to have demonstrated conclusively that the entire portal was assembled in the late 12th century, simultaneously with the construction of the second church.

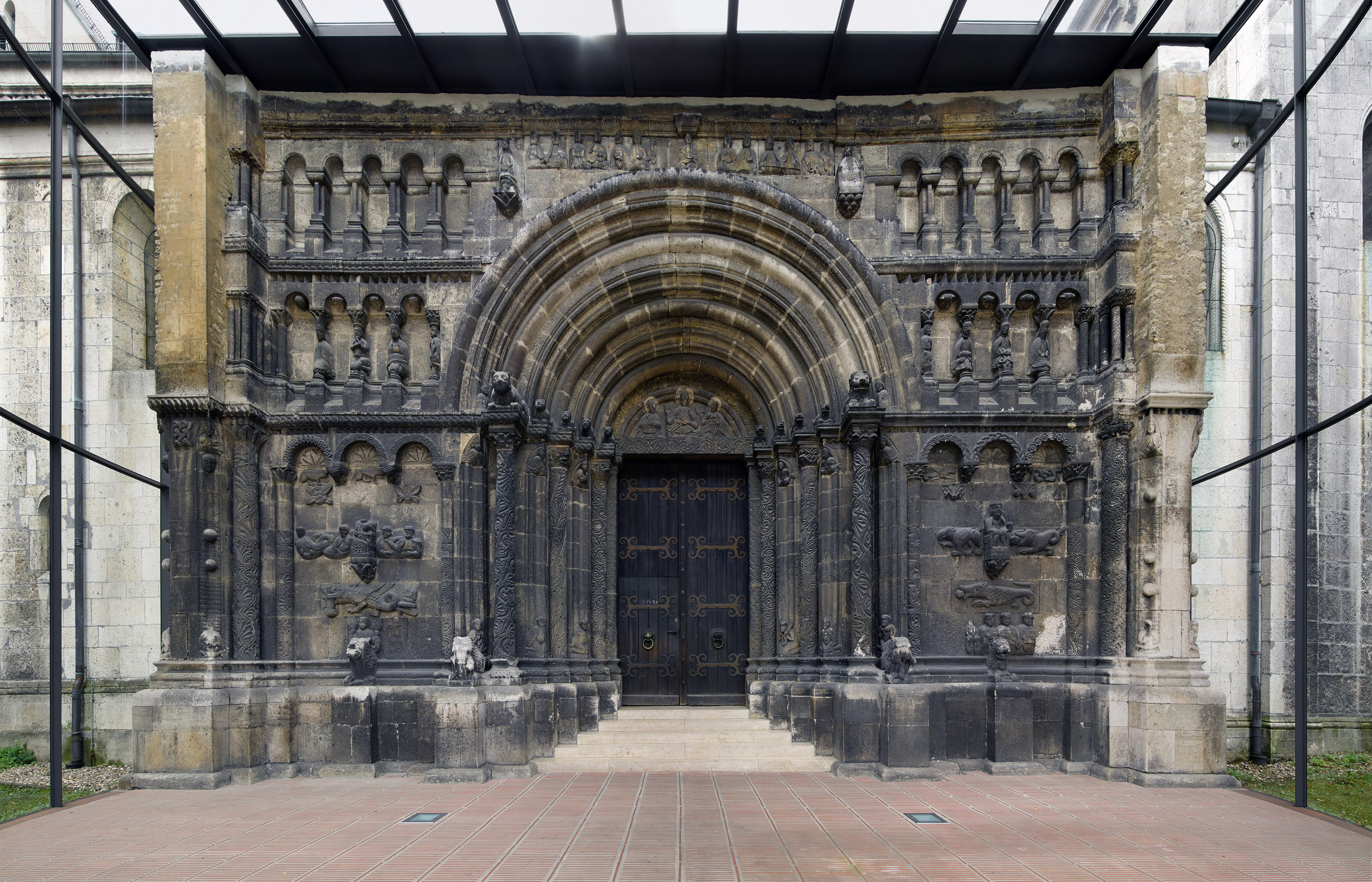
Schottenportal

The portal is divided into thirds both horizontally and vertically. At the lowest level, the door is framed at the center by richly decorated jambs, at each side of which stands a flat field interspersed with various relief sculptures. The second level is occupied by the tympanum and archivolt at the center and by blind arcades with caryatids at right and left. At the top, a frieze showing Christ with the twelve apostles stands at the middle, while figureless blind arcades stand at either side.

The interpretation of the tympanum is relatively uncontroversial: it portrays Christ, at the center, flanked by Sts. James and John. Numerous explanations for the remaining figures have been proposed; here only that of Richard Strobel has been presented.

There are various indications that the left side, as one faces the portal, is more highly regarded than the right. Its entablature carries a rich interlace, while that at right is undecorated; the arcade in the middle zone is filled by a row of human heads, while that at right is filled with those of animals. The central sculpture in the lowest zone at left, which is set on a throne and projects significantly from the ground, clearly represents Mary with the Christ child; the former, as the "new Eve," holds an apple, while the latter holds the book of life. The reliefs at either side show human figures caressing each other, that is, in attitudes of harmony. The corresponding central figure on the lowest zone at right, on the other hand, is bracketed by aggressive, hostile beasts; this may represent the Antichrist.

However, if the central figures at left and right are understood to stand for good and evil, respectively, the reliefs beneath them seem to represent a reversal of the situation. At left, a dragon is shown swallowing a lion, while at the lowermost level a siren appears, a symbol of temptation. At right, a crocodile is shown swallowing a hydrus, wrapped in a ball of clay. According to a medieval legend, the hydrus, once inside, would destroy the crocodile from within; the story was understood to represent the Harrowing of Hell. At the lowermost level monks are depicted with gospel books in hand, thus pilgrims and missionaries. Therefore, if the central figures at left are auspicious, while those at right carry negative connotations, the exact opposite situation prevails at the lowest levels.

The general preference for the left side, however, is resumed at the middle level. Here the figures at right appear to represent vices. For example, the second caryatid from the right is a woman holding snakes to her breast; she may represent Luxuria (unchastity). The caryatids at left, on the other hand, appear to represent virtues. For example, the second figure from the left is a man wearing a plaited belt; he may represent Fortitudo (bravery). The uppermost register, in which Christ appears flanked by the twelve apostles, is most likely a representation of the Last Judgment. It remains only to describe the jambs, which are decorated with a striking array of ornament, and at top and bottom with a variety of kneeling figures. The identities of some of these figures may be ascertained through their attributes. For example, the foremost figure at the lower right holds a t-shaped staff, which accessory was commonly associated with hermits and monks. The central figure at the upper right plays a bowed instrument, while the innermost figure at the upper left holds a vessel on which animal pelts are draped. These figures may refer to the history of the monastery itself: the monk with his staff to its origin among the hermits of Ireland; the musician to their position within the courtly society of Regensburg; and the fur-trader to their involvement with mercantile expeditions to Kiev.

As the portal reliefs have suffered from exposure to the elements, it was decided to enclose them within a glass vestibule. The work began in 1999, and was completed in 2000.

== History ==
=== Irish period ===
The monastery was founded in the 11th century by Scotti, that is, Gaels. (See Hiberno-Scottish mission.) Some of the "Scots" monks may have come from what is now Scotland, but the majority would have been from Ireland. Regensburg was an important centre for the Irish mission to central Europe, and the influential Scots monastery in Vienna was founded by monks from Regensburg in 1155/56. Other daughter establishments of St. Jakob were the Scots Monasteries in Erfurt (ca 1136), Würzburg (1138), Nuremberg (1140), Konstanz (1142), Eichstätt (1148/49), Memmingen (1178/81), Kiev (later 12th century) and Kelheim (1218?). The monks had a strong relationship with the famous school at Cashel.

Honorius Augustodunensis (died ca. 1151), a highly influential medieval theologian, spent the last years of his life in the monastery. It is also possible that the 12th-century Middle High German Kaiserchronik was written here, though this is disputed. The foundation of the monastery is described, for example, by Konrad von Megenberg in chapter six of his De limitibus parochiarum civitatis Ratisbonensis.

=== Scottish period ===
A papal bull of 1577 transferred the monastery from Irish hands to abbots from Scotland. The Scottish monks were predominantly from lowland Scotland, and thus were generally not Gaels. The effect of the bull was therefore a complete break in the continuity of the abbey's tradition. In part it may have been motivated by the fact that the word Scotti had by this time come to mean 'Scots' in the modern sense, allowing the new abbots to claim that the Irish possession had always been illegitimate. It was also partly because the Irish community in Regensburg was in any case in terminal decline: the last Irish abbot had just died leaving a single monk and one novice. But the strategic thinking behind the decision was certainly to provide a Catholic bulwark against the Scottish Reformation. The Scots Monastery was independent of German church authorities, instead coming under the sole authority of Rome.

The first Scottish abbot was Ninian Winzet (/ˈwɪnjət/, see yogh), the controversial critic of John Knox, who had been charged by Mary, Queen of Scots, with the task of providing priests for Scotland. However it was not until the early 17th century that the abbey was able to send missionaries to Scotland. From 1623 this was done in co-operation with English Benedictines at Douai, France.

In June 1776 Charles Arbuthnot became abbot. When in 1802 the Perpetual Diet of Regensburg determined, under pressure from Napoleon Bonaparte, to secularize all the church lands of the Empire, the Monastery was uniquely successful in avoiding this fate. Arbuthnot and his influential monk, Alexander Horn, lobbied Macdonald and Lauriston, Scottish Catholic generals in the French army. Horn, as the official British agent in Regensburg, further appealed to the British government. Arbuthnot declared the abbey a Scottish national shrine and the two priests successfully obtained the support of Charles Erskine, cardinal protector of Scotland in Rome. An express exemption was made in favour of the Scots abbey although it was not allowed to take any new novices.

In 1814, it came under the authority of the Bishop of Regensburg, but it was still not dissolved, since the monastery had laid out a large part of its fortune at an Austrian bank which the state did not want to lose. After Arbuthnot's death in 1820 the monastery was demoted to a priory because of the small number of monks forming the community.

==== Scottish abbots 1560–1820 ====
(incomplete list)

- c. 1560 – 1592 Ninian Winzet
- 1608 John VII
- 1692 Placidus Flemming
- 1743–1755 Bernard Stuart
- 1756–1775 Gallus Leith
- 1775–1820 Charles Arbuthnot

==== Scottish priors 1820–60 ====
(incomplete list)

- to 1862 Anselm Robertson

=== Current use ===
In 1862 the abbey was reopened as a seminary for the Roman Catholic Diocese of Regensburg.

=== Library ===
The medieval library built up by the Irish monks included many manuscript treasures. It is possible that it also contained parts of the library of the Viennese abbey. When the two last Scots monks finally left Regensburg in 1862, Anselm Robertson of Fochabers, the last prior, transported many of the greatest treasures to the Benedictine Abbey at Fort Augustus. In 1992, the Regensburg books and manuscripts from the Fort Augustus Collection were deposited in the National Library of Scotland.

Pride of place goes to a volume of texts written in 1080 by the Irish Benedictine monk Marianus, the founder of the community at Regensburg (NLS Acc.11218/1). This contains, in Marianus's hand, the earliest written Gaelic words to be found in any work in Scotland. There is also a translation of a Latin text into Scots, made in 1596 by Fr James Dalrymple and seen as of great importance as a Scots language text (NLS Acc.11218/4).

== Sources ==
- Lore Conrad: Die Bildsymbolsprache der romanischen Schottenkirche in Regensburg. 6th edition. Regensburg 1993, ISBN 3-9800355-5-7.
- Helmut Flachenecker: Schottenklöster. Irische Benediktinerkonvente im hochmittelalterlichen Deutschland. Paderborn, 1995, ISBN 3-506-73268-4.
- Elgin von Gaisberg: Das Schottenportal in Regensburg. Bauforschung und Baugeschichte. Regensburg 2005, ISBN 3-937527-07-9.
- Paul Mai, ed.: Scoti peregrini in St. Jakob. Regensburg, 2005, ISBN 3-7954-1775-9.
- Helmut-Eberhard Paulus et al., eds.: Romanik in Regensburg. Kunst, Geschichte, Denkmalpflege. Regensburg 1996, ISBN 3-7954-1095-9.
- Alasdair Roberts: Regensburg and the Scots, Aberdeen 2005.
- Mona Stocker: Die Schottenkirche St. Jakob in Regensburg: Skulptur und stilistisches Umfeld. Regensburg 2001, ISBN 3-930480-56-5.
- Richard Strobel: Schottenkirche St. Jakob, Regensburg (=Schnell Kunstführer Nr. 691). 18th edition, Regensburg 2006, ISBN 3-7954-4437-3.
- Richard Strobel and Markus Weis: Romanik in Altbayern. Zodiaque-Echter, Würzburg 1994, ISBN 3-429-01616-9.
- Stefan Weber: Iren auf dem Kontinent. Das Leben des Marianus Scottus von Regensburg und die Anfänge der irischen «Schottenklöster», Heidelberg 2010.
