= Gerd von Hassler =

German musician and writer (1928–1989)

Gerd von Hassler (or in German Gerd von Haßler) (28 August 1928 – 7 January 1989) was a German author, director, radio broadcaster, composer, singer, journalist and producer.

== Life and career ==
He was born Hans Leo Gerd von Haßler zu Roseneckh near Augsburg, he studied literature, music and ancient history. He later wrote children's plays which he became most famous for and was a radio speaker in which he produced plays (Radio drama). He also produced 27 records with which he composed or arranged music: shanties, student songs and folk music.

After finishing many of his popular radio plays, Hassler took an interest in publishing a number of books. His main interest was studying the legendary continent of Atlantis, which he discussed and documented in various publications such as his 1976 book Noahs Weg zum Amazonas (Noah's route to the Amazon), which was translated in English by the paranormal writer Martin Ebon under the title of The lost survivors of the deluge (1980). In the book Hassler discussed evidence for a global flood due to worldwide flood legends, Sumerians describing a boat similar to Noah's Ark, Noah visiting the Amazon and Atlantis being the Garden of Eden. The book is similar to the work of Charles Berlitz but Hassler never received mainstream recognition for his book like Berlitz did.

== Published works ==
- Noahs Weg zum Amazonas, (1976) Later printed as Lost Survivors of the Deluge (1980) ISBN 0-451-08365-2
- Rätselhaftes Wissen, 1977
- Wenn die Erde kippt, 1981
- Welt ohne Notausgang, 1984
- Der Menschen törichte Angst vor der Zukunft, 1987
