= Hans Leo Hassler =

German composer (1564–1612)

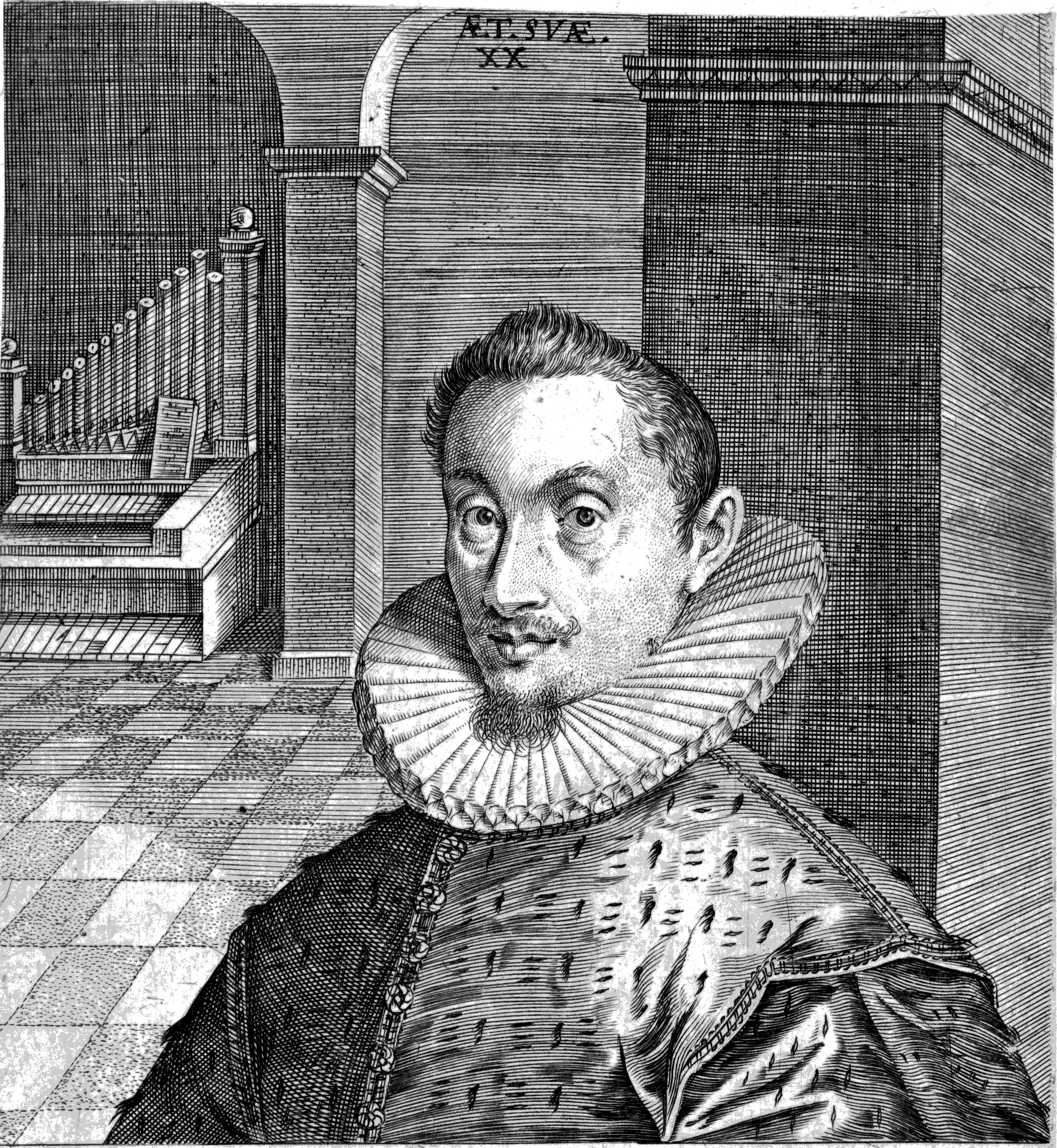
- Engraving of Hassler by Dominicus Custos, 1593
- Born: Nürnberg
- Baptised: 26 October 1564
- Died: 8 June 1612 (aged 47); Frankfurt
- Occupations: Composer; Organist

Hans Leo Hassler (in German, Hans Leo Haßler) (baptised 26 October 1564 – 8 June 1612) was a German composer and organist of the late Renaissance and early Baroque eras, elder brother of lesser known composer Jakob Hassler. He was born in Nuremberg and died in Frankfurt.

== Biography ==
Hassler was born in Nuremberg and baptised on 26 October 1564, receiving his first instruction in music from his father, the organist Isaak Hassler. In 1584, Hassler became the first of many German composers of the time who went to Italy to continue their studies; he arrived in Venice during the peak of activity of the Venetian school, the composers who wrote in the resplendent polychoral style, which was soon to become popular outside its native city. Hassler was already familiar with some of this music, as numerous prints had circulated in Germany due to the interest of Leonhard Lechner, who was associated with Orlandus Lassus in Munich.

While in Venice, Hassler became friends with Giovanni Gabrieli, with whom he composed a wedding motet for Georg Gruber, a Nuremberg merchant living in Venice, in 1600. Together they studied with Andrea Gabrieli, Giovanni's uncle. Under Andrea, Hassler received instruction in composition and organ playing.

Following Andrea Gabrieli's death, Hassler returned to Germany in the latter part of 1585, moving to Augsburg where he served as an organist to Octavian II Fugger, a nobleman there. The Augsburg years were extremely creative for him; in addition he became well known as a composer and organist at this time, though his influence was limited because he was a Protestant in an area which was still heavily Roman Catholic.

Hassler was not only a composer, but also an active organist and a consultant to organ builders. In 1596, Hassler, along with 53 other organists, was given the opportunity to examine a new instrument with 59 stops at the Schlosskirche, Groningen. Hassler was continually recognised for his expertise in organ design, and was often called upon as the examiner of new instruments. Using his extensive organ background, Hassler stepped into the world of mechanical instrument construction and developed a clockwork organ that was later sold to Emperor Rudolf II.

In 1602, Hassler returned to Nuremberg where he became the Kapellmeister, or director of town music. While there, he was appointed Kaiserlicher Hofdiener in the court of Rudolf II. In 1604, he took a leave of absence and travelled to Ulm, where he was wed to Cordula Claus. Four years later, Hassler moved to Dresden where he served as the electoral chamber organist to the Elector Christian II of Saxony, and eventually as Kapellmeister. By this time, Hassler had already developed the tuberculosis that would claim his life in June 1612. After he died, Michael Praetorius and Heinrich Schütz were appointed in his place.

== Style ==
Hassler was one of the first to bring the innovations of the Venetian style across the Alps. Through his songs, “in the manner of foreign madrigal and canzonets,” and the Lustgarten, Hassler brought to Germany the villanelle, canzonette, and dance songs of Gastoldi and Orazio Vecchi. As the first great German composer to undertake an “Italian Journey,” Hassler's influence was one of the reasons for the Italian domination over German music and for the common trend of German musicians finishing their education in Italy. While musicians of the stature of Lassus had been working in Germany for years, they represented the older school, the prima pratica, the fully developed and refined Renaissance style of polyphony; in Italy new trends were emerging which were to define what was later called the Baroque era. Musicians such as Hassler, and later Schütz, carried the stile concertato, the polychoral idea, and the freely emotional expression of the Venetians into the German culture, creating the first and most important Baroque development outside of Italy.

Though Hassler was Protestant, he wrote many masses and directed the music for Catholic masses in Augsburg. While in the service of Octavian Fugger, Hassler dedicated both his Cantiones sacrae and a book of masses for four to eight voices to him. Due to the demands of the Catholic patrons, and his own Protestant beliefs, Hassler's compositions represented a skillful blend of both denominations’ music styles that allowed his compositions to function in both contexts. Thus, many of Hassler's works could be used both in the Roman Catholic Church and the Lutheran. During his time in Augsburg, Hassler only produced two works that were specifically meant for the Lutheran church. Under the commission of the free city of Nuremberg, the Psalmen simpliciter was composed in 1608, and was dedicated to the city. Hassler also produced the Psalmen und christliche Gesänge, mit vier Stimmen auf die Melodeien fugweis komponiert in 1607 and dedicated it to Elector Christian II of Saxony. Stylistically, Hassler's early works exhibit reflections of the influence of Lassus, while his later works are marked by the impressions left on him by his studies in Italy. After returning from Italy, Hassler incorporated polychoral techniques, textural contrasts and occasional chromaticism in his compositions. His later masses were characterized by light melodies juxtaposed with the grace and fluidity of the madrigalian dance songs; thus creating a charming sacred style that was more sonorous than it was profound. His secular music—madrigals, canzonette, and songs among the vocal, and ricercars, canzonas, introits and toccatas among the instrumental—show many of the advanced techniques of the Gabrielis in Italy, but with a somewhat more restrained character, and always attentive to craftsmanship and beauty of sound. However, Hassler's greatest success in combining the German and Italian compositional styles existed in his lieder. In 1590, Hassler released his first publication, a set of twenty-four, four-part canzonette. The Lustgarten neuer teutscher Gesang, Balletti, Galliarden und Intraden, which contains thirty-nine vocal and eleven instrumental pieces, is Hassler's most renowned collection of lieder. Within this work, Hassler published dance collections for four, five, or six string or wind instruments with voice and without continuo. He also composed Mein G'müt ist mir verwirret, a five-part piece. Its melody was later combined with the text O Haupt voll Blut und Wunden of Paul Gerhardt, in which form it was used by Bach in his St Matthew Passion. Bach also employed the melody as a counterpoint to the aria Komm, du süße Todesstunde in Cantata 161 and used it once again as the final chorale in that same cantata.

Along with many of his contemporaries, Hassler sought to blend the Italian virtuoso style with the traditional style prevalent in Germany. This was accomplished in the chorale motet by employing the thorough bass continuo and including instrumental and solo ornamentation. Hassler's motets exhibit this blend of the old and the new in the way they reflect both the influence of Lassus and the two four-part chorus style of the Gabrielis.

Hassler is considered to be one of the most important German composers of all time. His use of the innovative Italian techniques, coupled with traditional, conservative German techniques allowed his compositions to be fresh without the modern affective tone. His songs presented a combined vocal and instrumental literature that did not make use of the continuo, or only provided it as an option, and his sacred music introduced the Italian polychoral structures that would later influence many composers leading into the Baroque era.

== Works ==
Canzon a 4 voci
Performed on organ by Ulrich Metzner

- Canzonette (Nuremberg, 1590)
- Cantiones sacrae (Augsburg, 1591), including the motets Dixit Maria and Verbum caro factum est
- Madrigals (Augsburg, 1596)
- Neüe teüsche Gesäng nach Art der welschen Madrigalien und Canzonetten (Augsburg, 1596)
- Masses (Nuremberg, 1599)
- Lustgarten Neuer Teutscher Gesäng (Nuremberg, 1601)
- Sacri concentus (Augsburg, 1601 and 1612)
- Psalmen und christliche Gesäng (Nuremberg, 1607)
- Psalmen simpliciter (Nuremberg, 1608)
- Kirchengesäng (Nuremberg, 1608)
- Venusgarten (Nuremberg, 1615) (instrumental music)
- Litaney teütsch (Nuremberg, 1619)
- Trois entrées, listen to from: Dances of the Renaissance, Harmonia Mundi: HMA195610 by Clemencic Consort and René Clemencic.
