= List of cryptozoologists =

This is an alphabetical list of notable cryptozoologists and people associated with the field of cryptozoology, including prominent skeptics and hoaxers.

== A ==
- Michael M. Ames (1933–2006), Canadian anthropologist and co-author of Manlike Monsters on Trial: Early Records and Modern Evidence

== B ==
- Cliff Barackman, host of Finding Bigfoot
- Henry H. Bauer (b. 1931), American chemist, professor, and Loch Ness Monster researcher
- Jon-Erik Beckjord (1939–2008), American cryptozoologist and ufologist
- Ryan Bergara (b. 1990), American cryptozoologist and internet personality
- John Bindernagel (1941–2018), Canadian wildlife biologist and Bigfoot researcher; author of North America's Great Ape: the Sasquatch
- Tom Biscardi (b. 1948), Bigfoot researcher involved in multiple hoaxes. Well known as a hoaxer himself.
- John Blashford-Snell (b. 1936), British explorer and Life President of the Centre for Fortean Zoology
- Joshua Blu Buhs, Bigfoot skeptic and author of Bigfoot: The Life and Times of a Legend
- Neville Bonney, Australian botanist and Tantanoola Tiger researcher
- Maurice Burton (1898–1992), author of The Elusive Monster: An Analysis of the Evidence from Loch Ness and Loch Ness Monster skeptic
- R. G. Burton, Brigadier General in the British Army and author of several texts on unidentified dogs, wolves, and other canines
- Peter C. Byrne, Explorer, media personality, Bigfoot researcher

== C ==
- Robert Todd Carroll (1945–2016), author of The Skeptic's Dictionary and Bigfoot skeptic
- David Hatcher Childress (b. 1957), American pseudoarchaeologist and cryptozoologist
- Jerome Clark (b. 1946), American ufologist and author of over a dozen books on paranormal phenomena including Cryptozoology A to Z
- John Colarusso, Canadian linguist and author of Ethnographic Information on a Wild Man of the Caucasus
- Loren Coleman (b. 1947), author of several books on cryptozoology and notable cryptozoologists
- John Robert Colombo (b. 1936), Canadian writer and author of Mysteries of Ontario
- John Conway, Australian palaeoartist and co-author of Cryptozoologicon
- William R. Corliss (1926–2011), anomalist and author of many books pertaining to unexplained phenomena in the natural world
- Paul Cropper, Australian cryptozoologist and author of Out of the Shadows: Mystery Animals of Australia

== D ==
- David J. Daegling, American anthropologist who has performed research on Bigfoot video evidence
- René Dahinden (1930–2001), Swiss-Canadian Bigfoot researcher
- Vine Deloria Jr. (1933–2005), Dakota activist and proponent of fossil giants
- Tim Dinsdale (1924–1987), Loch Ness Monster researcher
- Rick Dyer, American businessman and Bigfoot hoaxer

== E ==
- Eduardo Viveiros de Castro (born 1951) is a Brazilian anthropologist
- Richard Ellis (b. 1938), marine life artist and author of Monsters of the Sea and The Search for the Giant Squid

== F ==
- Tim Fasano (1956–2019), American taxi driver, blogger, and Bigfoot researcher
- James "Bobo" Fay, host of Finding Bigfoot
- Paul Freeman (1943–2003), Bigfoot researcher
- Richard Freeman (b. 1970), British cryptozoologist and Centre for Fortean Zoology researcher

== G ==
- Clive Gamble (b. 1951), British anthropologist; wild men skeptic and co-author of In Search of the Neanderthals
- Josh Gates (b. 1977), host of paranormal and cryptozoology-focused television shows including Destination Truth
- Albert Samuel Gatschet (1832–1907), Swiss-American anthropologist and lake monster researcher
- Bob Gimlin (b. 1931), American horse trainer who controversially claims to have filmed a living Bigfoot in 1967
- Rupert Gould (1890–1948), Loch Ness Monster researcher
- John Willison Green (1927–2016), Canadian journalist and Bigfoot researcher
- J. Richard Greenwell (1942–2005), secretary of the International Society of Cryptozoology

== H–I ==
- Gathorne Gathorne-Hardy, 1st Earl of Cranbrook (1814–1906), British politician and Beruang Rambai researcher
- Bernard Heuvelmans (1916–2001), Belgian-French cryptozoologist and author of several books on the topic including On the Track of Unknown Animals
- William Charles Osman Hill (1901–1975), British primatologist and cryptozoologist
- Fredrick William Holiday (1921–1979), English journalist and Loch Ness Monster researcher
- Ranae Holland, host of Finding Bigfoot
- Trader Horn (1861–1931), English ivory trader and explorer; proponent of the Amali

== J–K ==
- Barnaby Jones, Cryptozoologist, author, founder of Cryptids Anomalies and the Paranormal Society, host of Monsters on the Edge podcast
- John Keel (1930–2009), American ufologist and Mothman researcher; author of The Mothman Prophecies
- Aleksandr Kondratov (1937–1993), Russian scientist and proponent of living dinosaurs; author of Динозавра ищите в глубинах (English: Dinosaurs in the Depths)
- C. M. Kosemen (b. 1984), Turkish artist and co-author of Cryptozoologicon
- Grover Krantz (1931–2002), American physical anthropologist and Bigfoot researcher
- Laura Krantz, relative of Grover Krantz and host of Wild Thing

== L ==
- Richard S. Lambert (1894–1981), English-Canadian writer; author of Exploring the Supernatural: The Weird in Canadian Folklore
- Rula Lenska (b. 1947), Polish-English actor and conservation activist; co-author of Mammoth Hunt: In Search of the Giant Elephants of Nepal
- Willy Ley (1906–1969), German-American science writer and author of several texts on cryptozoology, including Exotic Zoology
- Daniel Loxton (b. 1975), Canadian writer and cryptozoology skeptic; co-author of Abominable Science!: Origins of the Yeti, Nessie, and Other Famous Cryptids

== M ==
- Roy Mackal (1925–2013), University of Chicago professor known for interest in Loch Ness Monster and Mokele mbembe
- Shane Madej (1986–Present), American cryptozoologist and internet personality
- Vladimir Markotic (1920–1994), Croatian-American anthropologist and cryptozoologist
- Adrienne Mayor (b. 1946), author of Fossil Legends of the First Americans and cryptozoology skeptic
- Jim McClarin, American Bigfoot researcher
- Jeffrey Meldrum (b. 1958), Idaho State University anatomy and anthropology professor; Bigfoot researcher
- Reinhold Messner (b. 1944), Italian mountaineer; Yeti skeptic and author of My Quest for the Yeti
- Marc Wolfgang Miller, American explorer and cryptozoologist
- Matthew Moneymaker, founder of the Bigfoot Field Researchers Organization and host of Finding Bigfoot

== N ==
- Darren Naish (b. 1975), British palaeontologist and cryptid skeptic; author of Hunting Monsters: Cryptozoology and the Reality Behind the Myths and Cryptozoologicon
- John R. Napier (1917–1987), primatologist and Bigfoot researcher
- Joe Nickell (b. 1944), American paranormal skeptic and co-author of Lake Monster Mysteries: Investigating the World's Most Elusive Creatures
- Rory Nugent (b. 1952), American explorer and Mokele-mbembe researcher

== O ==
- Anthonie Cornelis Oudemans (1858–1943), Dutch zoologist and sea serpent researcher

== P–Q ==
- Roger Patterson (1933–1972), Bigfoot researcher who controversially claimed to have filmed Bigfoot in 1967
- Boris Porshnev (1905–1972), Soviet historian and cryptozoologist
- Donald Prothero (b. 1954), American palaeontologist and cryptozoology skeptic; co-author of Abominable Science!: Origins of the Yeti, Nessie, and Other Famous Cryptids
- Robert Michael Pyle (b. 1947), American lepidopterist and Bigfoot researcher; author of Where Bigfoot Walks: Crossing the Dark Divide

== R ==
- Benjamin Radford (b. 1970), American writer and cryptozoology skeptic; author of Bigfoot at 50: Evaluating the Evidence
- Brian Regal, American science historian and cryptozoology skeptic; author of Searching for Sasquatch: Crackpots, Eggheads and Cryptozoology
- Bob Rickard, British writer and former editor of the Fortean Times
- Byambyn Rinchen (1905–1977), Mongolian scholar and proponent of Almas research
- Robert H. Rines (1922–2009), Loch Ness Monster researcher

== S ==
- Ivan T. Sanderson (1911–1973), paranormal writer and cryptozoologist
- Esteban Sarmiento, primatologist and Bigfoot skeptic
- Peter Scott (1909–1989), co-founder of the Loch Ness Phenomena Investigation Bureau
- Daniel O. Schmitt, American anthropologist who has performed research on Bigfoot video evidence
- Frank Searle (1921–2005) spent 14 years looking daily for the Loch Ness Monster
- Eduard Seler (1849–1922), German anthropologist and cryptozoology skeptic
- Myra Shackley (b. 1949), British archaeologist and Bigfoot skeptic; author of Wildmen: Yeti, Sasquatch, and the Neanderthal Enigma
- Tony "Doc" Shiels (b. 1938), British magician and cryptozoologist
- Karl Shuker (b. 1959), British cryptozoologist and author
- Paul Sieveking (b. 1949), British writer and former editor of the Fortean Times
- Tom Slick (1916–1962), American adventurer and cryptozoologist
- Roderick Sprague (1933–2012), American anthropologist and Bigfoot researcher; author of The Scientist Looks at Sasquatch
- Chris Stringer (b. 1947), British anthropologist; wild men skeptic and co-author of In Search of the Neanderthals
- Daris Swindler (1925–2007), American anthropologist and Bigfoot skeptic

== T ==
- Odette Tchernine (1897–1992), British author and cryptozoologist
- Édouard Louis Trouessart (1842–1927), French zoologist and early proponent of a cryptid in Lake Chad
- Marcello Truzzi (1935–2003), skeptic and founder of several research groups including the Committee for the Scientific Investigation of Claims of the Paranormal (CSICOP)
- Jamsrangiin Tseveen (1880–1942), Buryat scientist and Almas researcher
- Frank Turk (1911–1996), British phantom cat researcher

== W ==
- M. A. Wetherell (1883–1939), leader of a 1933 expedition to find the Loch Ness Monster and hoaxer behind the "surgeon's photograph"
- Ezekiel Stone Wiggins (1839–1910), Canadian psychic and cryptozoologist
- Paul Willis, Australian science communicator and Yowie skeptic
- Nicholas Witchell (b. 1953), English journalist and Loch Ness Monster researcher

== See also ==
- List of cryptids
