= Bossburg, Washington =

Ghost town in Washington (state)

- Ghost town

- Location within Washington (state) Location within the United States
- Coordinates: 48°45′9″N 118°02′27″W
- Country: United States
- State: Washington
- County: Stevens

Population (1892)
  - Total: 800
- Time zone: UTC-8 (Pacific (PST))
  - Summer (DST): UTC-7 (PDT)

Bossburg is a ghost town in Stevens County, Washington, and is located on the east bank of the Columbia River just south of the Canada–US border. Bossburg had a maximum population of 800 in 1892. The town was once named "Young America," although in 1896 it was renamed in honor of the town's first citizen, C. S. Boss. It is currently best known for the 1969 discovery of the footprints in the snow of a supposed Sasquatch known as "Cripplefoot," and subsequent hi-jinks.

== History ==
The town produced lead and silver from established mines; however, when mining operations eventually slowed financial issues arose. In a futile effort to keep the town alive, a ferry system across the Columbia River was established, and a sawmill was built for lumber operations. Several Bossburg newspapers were published, notably the Bossburg Journal from 1893 to 1910, and the Bossburg Herald which was founded and published in 1910 for only one year.

The Bossburg cemetery is still in use and is cared for by local families; nevertheless, records are not routinely kept and as a result there are several unmarked graves.

== Bossburg Cripplefoot ==
=== Bossburg Cripplefoot tracks ===
On November 24, 1969, large human-like tracks with a crippled-looking right foot were found near the Bossburg town dump. (Earlier that year a woman had reported to the police that she had seen a Sasquatch in a nearby location.) The track maker was believed by some to be an injured Bigfoot and was dubbed by locals as the "Bossburg Cripple"; it is now generally known as "Cripplefoot." On November 27 Bigfoot searcher René Dahinden arrived to investigate, but by then the tracks had mostly been trampled by sightseers. Dahinden photographed and cast the best print he could find. He was joined for three days by another searcher, Bob Titmus, who returned about a month later.

After looking for two weeks for new evidence, Sasquatch-searchers Ivan Marx, a Bossburg resident, and René Dahinden finally found it. On December 13, 1969, they discovered 1089 giant human-like tracks in the snow leading to, from, and across a river near Lake Roosevelt, near Bossburg. They were joined later by anthropologist Grover Krantz, who took photos and made casts, and later, intermittently, by film-maker Roger Patterson and his assistant, Dennis Jenson, who stayed full-time. Casts and/or photos of the tracks were later studied by primatologist John Napier and anthropologist Jeff Meldrum. Those scientists became convinced of the tracks' authenticity.

René Dahinden was also impressed by the tracks, but was suspicious of certain circumstances. One circumstance was that before he and a passenger had seen the tracks, driver Marx pulled over, got out, and walked off, returning shortly thereafter and explaining that they had to leave immediately to retrieve his camera equipment, since he had just found tracks. This was just after they had passed an empty Jeep parked beside the road, whose inhabitants, René considered, might have been in the process of returning from their track-making. The Jeep was gone when they returned. But, ultimately, he accepted the tracks as authentic.

=== Sasquatch hoaxes ===
==== Captured Sasquatch hoax ====
In January 1970, while Bigfooters were in Bossburg in the wake of Ivan Marx's Cripplefoot track find there, they were approached by Joe Metlow, a prospector. He told them that he had a Bigfoot immobilized in an abandoned mine shaft and that he had sold it. The Bigfooters said that they "would top your best offer," and a bidding war ensued. John Green, a Canadian Sasquatch researcher, and a journalist and editor in his day job, came and got involved in a way that offended Dahinden. Metlow declined to give anyone a peek for $1000. Bids topped out at $55,000, which called his bluff, and interest fizzled when he wouldn't bite.

==== Sasquatch-foot-in-a-freezer hoax ====
Joe Metlow then claimed that he had a Sasquatch foot in his freezer, which started another bidding war. Again, he was evasive, changed his story, and ducked out of a trip to have potential buyers view it. At this point "it was obvious to the Sasquatch squads that they'd been had."

==== Filmed-Sasquatch hoax ====
Nine months later, Ivan Marx phoned René Dahinden in October 1970 and said, "I've got a film of the cripple[foot Bigfoot]." Bigfooters flocked back to Bossburg. After viewing his film, nearly all were convinced of its authenticity and a bidding war for rights ensued. However, Bigfooter Peter Byrne paid attention to a couple of children who had been saying that they knew where the film had been shot. When he arrived there, he discovered that the features of the site were inconsistent with what Marx had claimed about the circumstances of the filming and the height of the subject. Subsequent investigation turned up more red flags, and belief in the film evaporated. Peter Byrne wrote a detailed account of the episode, as did Michael McLeod.
