= Jacko hoax =

Canadian newspaper hoax

The Jacko hoax was a Canadian newspaper story about a gorilla supposedly caught near Yale, British Columbia in 1884. The story, titled "What is it?, A strange creature captured above Yale. A British Columbia Gorilla", appeared in the British Columbia newspaper the Daily Colonist on July 4, 1884. The original newspaper article describes "Jacko" as a gorilla and not a Sasquatch. However, the "Jacko" story has been used by Bigfoot advocates as evidence for the existence of Sasquatch. Many books about Bigfoot and cryptids have featured the event and cite the original newspaper article. In 2008 Michael Cremo discussed the story as possible proof for the existence of Sasquatch. The "Jacko" story was featured on the A&E television documentary series Ancient Mysteries about Bigfoot, season 4, episode 18 narrated by Leonard Nimoy. The story was also mentioned on the Bigfoot episode of the television series In Search of..., season 1, episode 5, also narrated by Nimoy. The Jacko story was mentioned in a 1976 documentary called The Mysterious Monsters.

Loren Coleman explained in 2003 how this story achieved its popularity: "During the 1950s, a news reporter named Bruce McKelvie found the article about Jacko. McKelvie shared the Jacko account with Sasquatch researchers John Green and René Dahinden. McKelvie told them that this was the only record of the event due to a fire that had destroyed other area newspapers at the time. The story's appearance in Ivan T. Sanderson's 1961 Abominable Snowman: Legend Come to Life propelled the Jacko story into history."

Loren Coleman continued, "John Green continued digging and finally found two important articles that threw [skeptical] light on the whole affair. Green wrote of[f] the Jacko story as a piece of probable journalistic fiction in Pursuit in 1975." But by then the story had taken on a life of its own. Combatting this, the writer Joe Nickell cited the Mainland Guardian's dismissal of the case (below) as a hoax.

On July 9, 1884, the Mainland Guardian newspaper in New Westminster, British Columbia stated "that no such animal was caught, and how the Colonist was duped in such a manner, and by such a story, is strange." On July 11, 1884, the newspaper British Columbian reported that about 200 people went to view "Jacko" at the jail where he was supposedly kept, but the people found only a man at the jail who fielded questions about a creature that did not exist.

Anthropologist and Bigfoot enthusiast Grover Krantz suggests that Jacko was purchased by P. T. Barnum and exhibited as Jo-Jo the Dog-Faced Boy. Photos of Jo-Jo between 1884 and 1885 indicate Jo-Jo was replaced. However, Bigfoot researcher Chad Arment claims that Jo-Jo was not Jacko, as Jo-Jo could speak many languages and could write his name according to an article in The New York Times, October 13, 1884.
