= Bigfoot: The Life and Times of a Legend =

2009 book by Joshua Blu Buhs

- Author: Joshua Blu Buhs
- Language: English
- Subjects: Bigfoot
- Publisher: The University of Chicago Press
- Publication date: 2009
- Media type: Print (Hardcover)
- Pages: 304
- ISBN: 978-0-226-07979-0

Bigfoot: The Life and Times of a Legend is a non-fiction book written by Joshua Blu Buhs and published in 2009 by the University of Chicago Press. It explores the history of the concept of Bigfoot, discusses the exploits of its believers, as well as hoaxers, and examines the cultural influences that give the entity its staying power.

== Overview ==
Bigfoot: The Life and Times of a Legend is an exploration of the history of Bigfoot (called Sasquatch in Canada), and its counterparts, the Abominable Snowman and Yeti, with a focus on stories from the American Pacific Northwest. Buhs maintains that Bigfoot does not actually inhabit the forests, but, is "real" in the sense that the stories told about the creature are "part of the American cultural landscape".

Buhs contends that Bigfoot is a construct of popular imagination representing a "tradition of the wild man" that "allowed white working-class men" to hold onto traditional, masculine roles while societal changes (feminism and civil rights) in the 1960s and 1970s "challenged their assumptions about society". Although Bigfoot has its roots in European and Asian fairy tales, and sightings of "giant figures with long reddish hair" were reported in the 1920s. Buhs claims Bigfoot stories in men's adventure magazines, like Argosy, True, and Saga, as well as "mockumentary" movies shown in makeshift movie theaters called "four-wallers" in 1970s rural America helped give shape to Bigfoot and secure its place in popular culture. Bigfoot became symbolic of the changes these men feared and way of connection with (or escaping into) the wilderness.

Buhs provides a historical accounting of Bigfoot encounters, including purported sightings and abductions. He surveys the physical evidence collected and photographed (footprints, tufts of fur, droppings), and introduces readers to such devotees of Bigfoot as Rene Dahinden, Roger Patterson, Ray Wallace, John R. Napier, Albert Ostman, P.T. Barnum, Grover Krantz, Ivan Sanderson, and others who researched, looked for, and, in some cases, faked Bigfoot sightings or exploited the idea of Bigfoot for their own gain.

Buhs also outlines how the commercialization of Bigfoot, through the sale of commercial products (B-movies, T-shirts, television shows, whiskey advertisements), transformed Bigfoot, once feared, into a creature to be ridiculed. Environmentalism, Buhs posits, changed Bigfoot into a gentle giant. By the mid-1970s, Bigfoot research had dissolved into "exposed hoaxes, arrogant and premature proclamations of conclusive evidence, and vindictive infighting."

== Reception ==
Reviewers of Bigfoot: The Life and Times of a Legend found the book, overall, to be an entertaining account of Bigfoot that lead to "interesting places".

His attempt at telling a historical account of tales of an imaginary creature, for some reviewers, was problematic. Folklorist Jennifer Attebury argued that although Buhs used "excellent secondary sources" and solid primary sources, the exploration of Bigfoot might better be described as "fakelore". She suggested that the book might have benefited from theoretical frameworks provided by contemporary folkloristics.

Still other reviewers found the Buhs characterization of Bigfoot as reflecting the hopes, fears, and desires of white working-class men "a bit of a stretch". Paul Lucier wrote in his review, that he "is sympathetic to the Bigfooters, and he tries to restrain any prejudgments, but in the end he cannot help but explode each incident and, perhaps unintentionally, show up the Bigfooters as either fools or frauds". In his review, Benjamin Radford wrote that Buhs characterized skeptics as "routinely ridiculing" the subject of Bigfoot, and suggested that prominent skeptical Bigfoot researchers, such as Michael Dennett, treated the subject and its claimants with respect.

Some members of the Bigfoot community received the book less than enthusiastically, calling it a literary fraud.
