= Ray Wallace =

Ray or Raymond Wallace may refer to:

- Raymond L. Wallace (1918–2002), American Bigfoot researcher & hoaxer
- Raymond Wallace, a pseudonym of English songwriter Huntley Trevor (1881–1943)
- Ray Wallace (footballer) (born 1969), English footballer
- Ray Wallace (mayor) (born 1961), mayor of Lower Hutt, New Zealand
- Ray Wallace, a character in 24
- Ray Wallace (American football) (born 1963), NFL running back
