= Wild Thing (podcast) =

Sociology podcast

- Language: English

Cast and voices
- Hosted by: Laura Krantz

Production
- Production: Foxtopus Ink

Publication
- No. of seasons: 2
- No. of episodes: 32
- Original release: October 2, 2018

Wild Thing is a podcast about the relationship between science and society. It is hosted by Laura Krantz and produced by Foxtopus Ink. In 2006 Krantz learned that she was related to anthropologist Grover Krantz, who had spent much of his career writing about and hunting for Sasquatch, after she read an article in the Washington Post. At the time, Krantz was working at National Public Radio and thought that she needed to investigate further. Through her reporting she came to understand that the search for Sasquatch spoke to important questions about human evolution, conspiracy theories, and the human connection to the natural world. The second season of Wild Thing concerns the search for extraterrestrial life, while the third season discusses the history and future of nuclear power.

== Episodes ==
Season 1: Sasquatch, Science and Society
#	Title	Original Air Date
1	Grover	Oct 2, 2018
2	Distant Relatives or Kissing Cousins	Oct 9, 2018
3	The Evidence	Oct 16, 2018
4	Eyewitness	Oct 30, 2018
5	A-C-T-G Spells B-G-F-T	Nov 6, 2018
6	Bump in the Night	Nov 13, 2018
7	Taboo	Nov 20, 2018
8	$a$quatch	Nov 27, 2018
9	Why We want to Believe	Dec 9, 2018

Season 2: Space Invaders

#	Title	Original Air Date
1	Out of This Word	Sep 17, 2020
2	What is Life?	Sep 24, 2020
3	Doing the Math	Oct 1, 2020
4	Roswell	Oct 8, 2020
5	Independence Day	Oct 15, 2020
6	Hear No Aliens, See No Aliens	Oct 22, 2020
7	E.T. Phone Home	Oct 29, 2020
8	Popular Science (Fiction)	Nov 5, 2020
9	You Gotta Have Faith	Nov 12, 2020
10	The Truth is Out There	Nov 19, 2020

Season 3: Going Nuclear
#	Title	Original Air Date
1	Close to Home	May 17, 2022
2	Out of Little Things	May 24, 2022
3	A New (clear) Hope	May 31, 2022
4	Chain Reaction	Jun 7, 2022
5	Trust Issues	Jun 14, 2022
6	You Look Radiant	Jun 21, 2022
7	Half-Life	Jun 28, 2022
8	Risky Business	Jul 5, 2022
9	An Atomic Future	Jul 12, 2022

In addition to the main episodes, both seasons also include bonus interviews. Season one includes conversations with well known cryptozoologist Bob Gimlin, director William Dear, Sasquatch hunter Peter Byrne and Bigfoot erotica author Virginia Wade. In season two Krantz speaks with astrophysicist Neil deGrasse Tyson, science YouTuber Joe Scott, as well as astronomers involved with searching for life on Venus and Mars.

== Critical reception ==
Wild Thing garnered largely positive press from around the country. The Atlantic announced Wild Thing as one of the best podcasts of 2018, largely owing to its gentle handling of a topic that many people view with skepticism. Emily Todd VanDerWeff of Vox wrote: "It’s smart, well produced, well written, and intelligently structured." Los Angeles Times called Wild Thing "Serial for Sasquatches." Mashable named it the most "binge-worth podcasts of 2018" The Atlantic named season 2 one of the best podcasts of 2020. The show was also featured in Rolling Stone, Outside, and Scientific American.
