= Patterson–Gimlin film =

1967 film allegedly containing footage of Bigfoot

Coordinates: 41°26′25″N 123°42′7″W

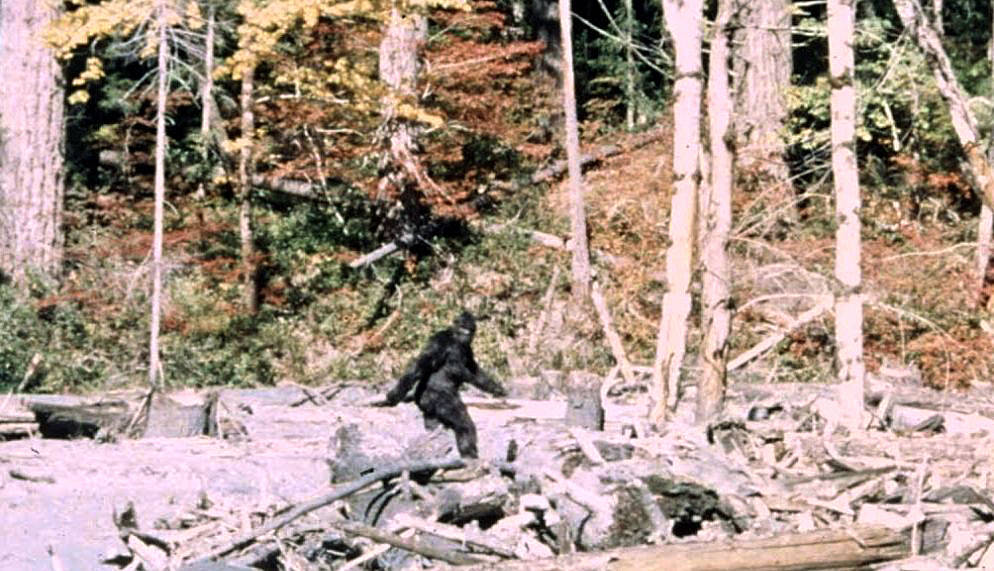
- Frame 352 of the Patterson–Gimlin film, alleged to depict a female Bigfoot

Creature information
- Folklore: Cryptid

Origin
- Country: United States
- Region: North America

The Patterson–Gimlin film is a 1967 American short motion picture, created by Roger Patterson and Robert Gimlin, that depicts an unidentified subject that the filmmakers asserted was a Bigfoot. The footage was shot in 1967 in Northern California, and has since been subjected to many attempts to authenticate or debunk it.

The footage was filmed alongside a tributary of the Klamath River, about 25 logging-road miles (40 km) northwest of Orleans, California, in Del Norte County on the Six Rivers National Forest. The film site is roughly 38 miles (60 km) south of Oregon and 18 miles (30 km) east of the Pacific Ocean. For decades, the exact location of the site was lost, primarily because of re-growth of foliage in the streambed after the flood of 1964. It was rediscovered in 2011. It is just south of a north-running segment of the creek informally known as "the bowling alley".

The filmmakers were Roger Patterson (1933–1972) and Robert "Bob" Gimlin (born 1931). Patterson died of cancer in 1972 and "maintained right to the end that the creature on the film was real". Patterson's friend, Gimlin, has always denied being involved in any part of a hoax with Patterson. Gimlin mostly avoided publicly discussing the subject from at least the early 1970s until about 2005 (except for three appearances), when he began giving interviews and appearing at Bigfoot conferences.

The film is 23.85 feet (7.27 m) long (preceded by 76.15 feet or 23.21 meters of "horseback" footage), has 954 frames, and runs for 59.5 seconds at 16 frames per second. If the film was shot at 18 fps, as Grover Krantz believed, the event lasted 53 seconds. The date was October 20, 1967, according to the filmmakers, although some critics believe it was shot earlier.

== Background ==
Patterson said he became interested in Bigfoot after reading an article about the creature by Ivan T. Sanderson in True magazine in December 1959. In 1961 Sanderson published his encyclopedic Abominable Snowmen: Legend Come to Life, a worldwide survey of accounts of Bigfoot-type creatures, including recent track finds, etc. in the Bluff Creek area, which heightened Patterson's interest. Thereafter, Marian Place wrote:

In 1962 he visited Bluff Creek and talked with a whole host of Bigfoot-believers. In 1964 he returned and met a timber-cruiser named Pat Graves, who drove him to Laird Meadows. There Patterson saw fresh tracks—‌for him an almost unbearably exciting, spine-chilling experience. What a tremendous feat it would be—‌what a scientific breakthrough—‌if he could obtain unshakable evidence that these tracks were not the work of a prankster, but the actual mark of a hitherto unknown creature! If he succeeded, he would be famous! And rich! Alas, fame and fortune were not gained that year, nor the next, nor the next. Patterson invested thousands of hours and dollars combing Bigfoot and Sasquatch territory. He fought constant ridicule and a shortage of funds [...] [and] founded [...] the Northwest Research Foundation. Through it he solicited funds. [...] The response was encouraging and enabled him to lead several expeditions. [...] In 1966 he published a paperback book at his own expense [...] [and] added the income from its sales and his lectures to the search fund. As each wilderness jaunt failed to see or capture the monster, one by one the thrill-seekers dropped out. But Patterson never gave up.

Patterson's book, Do Abominable Snowmen of America Really Exist?, was self-published in 1966. The book has been characterized as "little more than a collection of newspaper clippings laced together with Patterson's circus-poster style prose". The book, however, contains 20 pages of previously unpublished interviews and letters, 17 drawings by Patterson of the encounters described in the text, five hand-drawn maps (rare in subsequent Bigfoot books), and almost 20 photos and illustrations from others. It was first reprinted in 1996 by Chris Murphy, (Note: under his publishing company, Pyramid Productions, in a very limited number (approximately 200, according to Murphy)) and then again re-issued by Murphy (Note: under Hancock House Publishing) in 2005 under the title The Bigfoot Film Controversy, with 81 pages of additional material by Murphy.

In May/June 1967 Patterson began filming a docudrama or pseudo-documentary about cowboys being led by an old miner and a wise Indian tracker on a hunt for Bigfoot. The storyline called for Patterson, his Indian guide (Gimlin in a wig), and the cowboys to recall in flashbacks the stories of Fred Beck (of the 1924 Ape Canyon incident) and others as they tracked the beast on horseback. For actors and cameraman, Patterson used at least nine volunteer acquaintances, including Gimlin and Bob Heironimus, for three days of shooting, perhaps over the Memorial Day weekend. (Note: This is the only stretch in that period that all the men would have had 3 free days.) Patterson would have needed a costume to represent Bigfoot if the time came to shoot such climactic scenes.

Prior to the October 1967 filming, Patterson apparently visited Los Angeles on these occasions:

- Patterson drove to Hollywood in 1964 and visited rockabilly songwriter and guitarist Jerry Lee Merritt, a Yakima native who was living in Hollywood then. He was trying to sell his hoop-toy invention.
- In 1966 he visited Merritt again while he was still trying to sell his hoop-toy invention.

Merritt soon moved back to Yakima and became Patterson's neighbor, and later his collaborator on his Bigfoot documentary.

- Later in 1966 he and Merritt drove down there for several purposes. Patterson visited cowboy film star Roy Rogers for help. He tried to sell his ponies-and-wagon to Disneyland or Knott's Berry Farm.
- In the summer of 1967, apparently after getting $700 from the Radfords and shooting some of his documentary, they tried unsuccessfully to attract investors to help further fund his Bigfoot movie. They copyrighted or trademarked the term "Bigfoot".

Patterson had been a rodeo rider and amateur boxer—and local champion in his weight classes. Patterson had played high school football.

In October 1967, Patterson and his friend Gimlin set out for the Six Rivers National Forest in far Northern California. They drove in Gimlin's truck, carrying his provisions and three horses, positioned sideways. Patterson chose the area because of intermittent reports of the creatures in the past, and of their enormous footprints since 1958. His familiarity with the area and its residents from prior visits may also have been a factor.

The most recent of these reports was the nearby Blue Creek Mountain track find, which was investigated by journalist John Green, Bigfoot hunter René Dahinden, and archaeologist Don Abbott on and after August 28, 1967. This find was reported to Patterson (via his wife) soon thereafter by Al Hodgson, owner of the Willow Creek Variety Store.

Though Gimlin says he doubted the existence of Sasquatch-like creatures, he agreed to Patterson's insistence that they should not attempt to shoot one with a gun.

== Encounter ==
The film

As their stories went, in the early afternoon of Friday, October 20, 1967, Patterson and Gimlin were riding generally northeast (upstream) on horseback along the east bank of Bluff Creek. At sometime between 1:15 and 1:40 p.m., they "came to an overturned tree with a large root system at a turn in the creek, almost as high as a room".

When they rounded it, "there was a logjam—‌a 'crow's nest'— ‌left over from the flood of '64," and then they spotted the figure behind it nearly simultaneously. It was either "crouching beside the creek to their left" or "standing" there, on the opposite bank. Gimlin later described himself as in a mild state of shock after first seeing the figure.

Patterson initially estimated its height at 6 feet 6 inches (1.98 m) to 7 feet (2.1 m), and later raised his estimate to about 7 feet 6 inches (2.29 m). Some later analysts, anthropologist Grover Krantz among them, have suggested Patterson's later estimate was about 1 foot (0.30 m) too tall. Gimlin's estimate was 6 feet (1.8 m).

The film shows what Patterson and Gimlin claimed was a large, hairy, bipedal, apelike figure with short, "silvery brown" or "dark reddish-brown" or "black" hair covering most of its body, including its prominent breasts. The figure in the film generally matches the descriptions of Bigfoot offered by others who claim to have seen one.

Patterson estimated he was about 25 feet (7.6 m) away from the creature at his closest. Patterson said that his horse reared upon sensing the figure, and he spent about 20 seconds extricating himself from the saddle, controlling his horse, getting around to its other side, and getting his camera from a saddlebag before he could run toward the figure while operating his camera. He yelled "Cover me" to Gimlin, "meaning to get the gun out". Gimlin crossed the creek on horseback after Patterson had run well beyond it, riding on a path somewhat to the left of Patterson's and somewhat beyond his position. Patterson estimates he came within 60–90 feet (18–27 m) of "Patty". Then, rifle in hand, he dismounted, but did not point his rifle at the creature.

The figure had walked away from them to a distance of about 120 feet (37 m) before Patterson began to run after it. The resulting film (about 59.5 seconds long at 16 fps) is initially quite shaky until Patterson got about 80 feet (24 m) from the figure. At that point, the figure glanced over its right shoulder at the men and Patterson fell to his knees; on Krantz's map this corresponds to frame 264. To researcher John Green, Patterson would later characterize the creature's expression as one of "contempt and disgust ... you know how it is when the umpire tells you 'one more word and you're out of the game.' That's the way it felt."

Patterson said, "it turned a total of I think three times". Shortly after this point the steady, middle portion of the film begins, containing the famous look-back frame 352. Shortly after glancing over its shoulder on film, the creature disappeared behind a grove of trees for 14 seconds, then reappeared in the film's final 15 seconds after Patterson moved 10 feet (3 m) to a better vantage point, fading into the trees again and being lost to view at a distance of 265 feet (81 m) as the reel of film ran out.

Gimlin remounted and followed it on horseback, keeping his distance, until it disappeared around a bend in the road three hundred yards (270 m) away. Patterson called him back at that point, feeling vulnerable on foot without a rifle, because he feared the creature's mate might approach. The entire encounter had lasted less than two minutes.

Next, Gimlin and Patterson rounded up Patterson's horses, which had run off in the opposite direction, downstream, before the filming began. Patterson got his second roll of film from his saddlebag and filmed the tracks. Then the men tracked "Patty" for either one mile (1.6 km) or three miles (4.8 km), but "lost it in the heavy undergrowth". They went to their campsite three miles (4.8 km) south, picked up plaster, returned to the initial site, measured the creature's step-length, and made two plaster casts, one each of the best-quality right and left prints.

=== Details ===
According to Patterson and Gimlin, they were the only witnesses to their brief encounter with what they claimed was a Sasquatch. Their statements agree in general, but author Greg Long notes a number of inconsistencies. They offered somewhat different sequences in describing how they and the horses reacted upon seeing the creature. Patterson in particular increased his estimates of the creature's size in subsequent retellings of the encounter. In a different context, Long argues, these discrepancies would probably be considered minor, but given the extraordinary claims made by Patterson and Gimlin, any apparent disagreements in perception or memory are worth noting.

The film's defenders have responded by saying that commercially motivated hoaxers would have "got their stories straight" beforehand so they would not have disagreed immediately upon being interviewed, and on so many points, and so they wouldn't have created a suit and a creature with foreseeably objectionable features and behaviors.

A more serious objection concerns the film's "timeline". This is important because Kodachrome II movie film, as far as is known, could be developed only by a lab containing a $60,000+ machine, and the few West Coast labs known to possess one did not do developing over weekends. Patterson's brother-in-law Al DeAtley claims not to remember where he took the film for development or where he picked it up.

Critics claim that too much happened between the filming (at 1:15 at the earliest) and the filmmakers' arrival in Willow Creek (at 6:30 at the latest). Daegling wrote, "All of the problems with the timeline disappear if the film is shot a few days or hours beforehand. If that is the case, one has to wonder what other details of this story are wrong." The film's defenders retort that although the time window was tight, it was doable.

Chris Murphy wrote, "I have confirmed with Bob Gimlin that Patterson definitely rode a small quarter horse (which he owned), not his Welsh pony 'Peanuts'. Also, that Patterson had arranged to borrow a horse by the name of 'Chico' from Bob Heironimus for Gimlin to use [...] Gimlin did not have a horse that was suitable (old enough) for the expedition." Heironimus stated that Chico (a middle-aged gelding) "wouldn't jump or buck".

== Immediate aftermath ==
At approximately 6:30 p.m., Patterson and Gimlin met up with Al Hodgson at his variety store in Willow Creek, approximately 54.3 miles (87.4 km) south by road, about 28.8 miles (46.3 km) by Bluff Creek Road from their camp to the 1967 roadhead by Bluff Creek, and 25.5 miles (41 km) down California State Route 96 to Willow Creek. Patterson intended to drive on to Eureka to ship his film. Either at that time, or when he arrived in the Eureka/Arcata area, he called Al DeAtley (his brother-in-law in Yakima) and told him to expect the film he was shipping. He requested Hodgson to call Donald Abbott, whom Grover Krantz described as "the only scientist of any stature to have demonstrated any serious interest in the [Bigfoot] subject," hoping he would help them search for the creature by bringing a tracking dog. Hodgson called, but Abbott declined. Krantz argued that this call the same day of the encounter is evidence against a hoax, at least on Patterson's part.

After shipping the film, they headed back toward their camp, where they had left their horses. On their way they "stopped at the Lower Trinity Ranger Station, as planned, arriving about 9:00 p.m. Here they met with Syl McCoy [another friend] and Al Hodgson." At this point Patterson called the daily Times-Standard newspaper in Eureka and related his story. They arrived back at their campsite at about midnight. At either 5 or 5:30 the next morning, after it started to rain heavily, Gimlin returned to the filmsite from the camp and covered the other prints with bark to protect them. The cardboard boxes he had been given by Al Hodgson for this purpose and had left outside were so soggy they were useless, so he left them.

When he returned to the camp he and Patterson aborted their plan to remain looking for more evidence and departed for home, fearing the rain would wash out their exit. After attempting to go out along "the low road"—Bluff Creek Road—and finding it blocked by a mudslide, they went instead up the steep Onion Valley Road, off whose shoulder their truck slipped; extracting it required the (unauthorized) borrowing of a nearby front-end loader. The drive home from their campsite covered about 580 miles (930 km): the initial 28.8 miles (46.3 km) on a low-speed logging road, and then about 110 miles (180 km) on twisty Route 96. Driving a truck with three horses, and allowing for occasional stops, it would have taken 13 hours to get home Saturday evening, at an average speed of 45 miles per hour (72 km/h); it would have taken 14.5 hours at a 40 mph (64 km/h) average speed.

US Forest Service timber management assistant Lyle Laverty said, "I [and his team of three, in a Jeep] passed the site on either Thursday the 19th or Friday the 20th" and noticed no tracks. After reading the news of Patterson's encounter on their weekend break, Laverty and his team returned to the site on Monday, the 23rd, and made six photos of the tracks. (Laverty later served as an Assistant Secretary of the Interior under George W. Bush.) Taxidermist and outdoorsman Robert Titmus went to the site with his sister and brother-in-law nine days later. Titmus made plaster casts of 10 successive prints of the creature and plotted Patterson's and the creature's movements on a map as well as he could.

== Long-term aftermath ==
=== Film-related ===
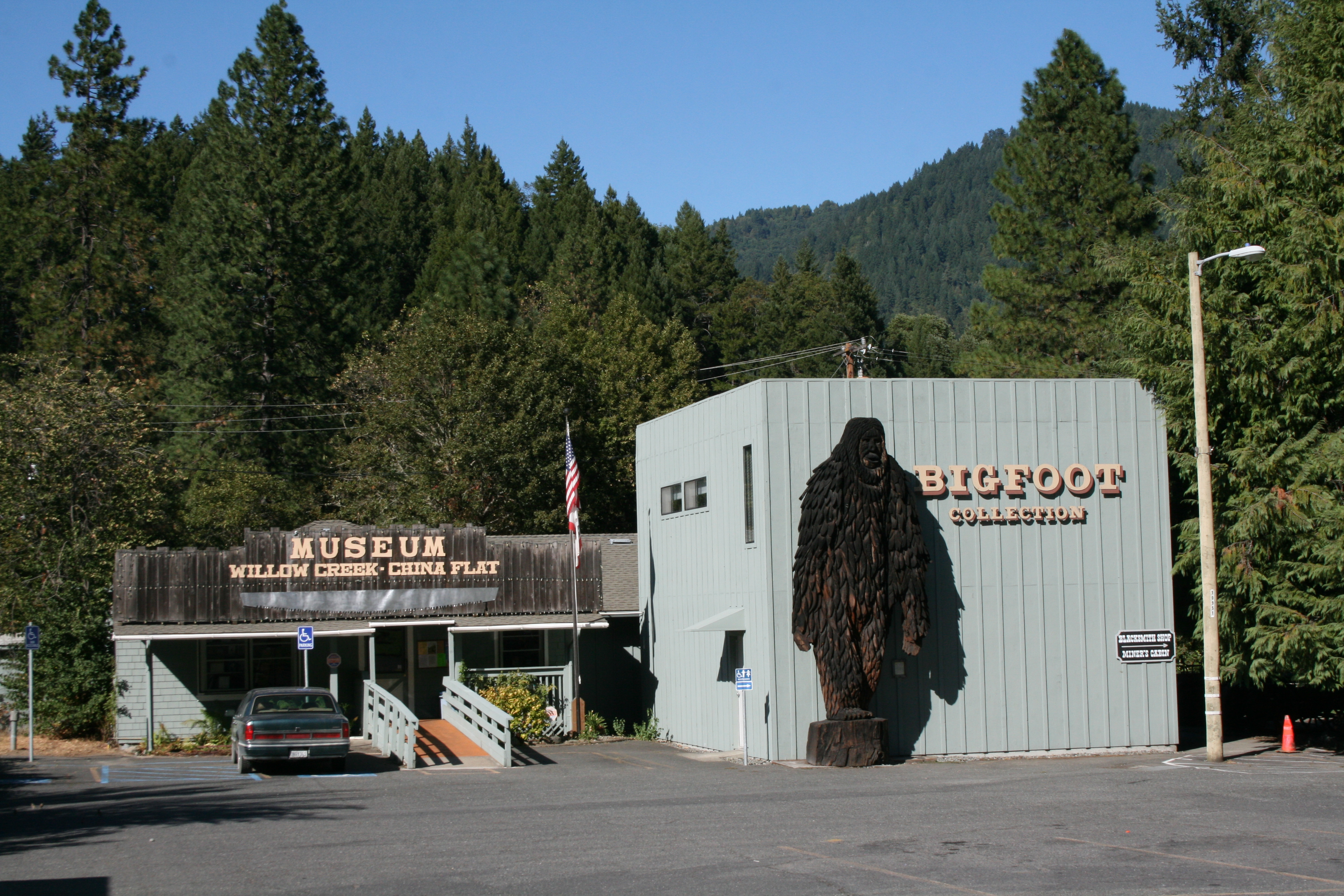
The "Bigfoot Museum" in Willow Creek, California

Grover Krantz writes that "Patterson had the film developed as soon as possible. At first he thought he had brought in proof of Bigfoot's existence and really expected the scientists to accept it. But only a few scientists were willing to even look at the film," usually at showings at scientific organizations. These were usually arranged at the behest of zoologist, author, and media figure Ivan Sanderson, a supporter of Patterson's film. Seven showings occurred, in Vancouver, Manhattan, The Bronx, Washington, D.C., Atlanta, and Washington, D.C. again (all by the end of 1968); then, later, in Beaverton, Oregon. Of those who were quoted, most expressed various reservations, although some were willing to say they were intrigued by it.

Christopher Murphy wrote, "Dahinden traveled to Europe [with the film] in 1971. He visited England, Finland, Sweden, Switzerland and Russia. Although scientists in these countries were somewhat more open-minded than those in North America, their findings were basically the same . ... A real glimmer of hope, however, emerged [in Russia, where he met Bayanov, Bourtsev, and their associates]."

Though there was little scientific interest in the film, Patterson was still able to capitalize on it. He made a deal with the BBC, allowing the use of his footage in a docudrama made in return for letting him tour with their docudrama, into which he melded material from his own documentary and additional material he and Al DeAtley filmed. This film was shown in local movie houses around the Pacific Northwest and Midwest. A technique commonly used for nature films called "four-walling" was employed, involving heavy local advertising, mostly on TV, of a few days of showings. It was a modest financial success. Al DeAtley estimated that his 50% of the film's profits amounted to $75,000.

The film generated a fair amount of national publicity. Patterson appeared on a few popular TV talk shows to promote the film and belief in Bigfoot by showing excerpts from it: for instance, on the Joe Pyne Show in Los Angeles, in 1967, which covered most of the western US; on Merv Griffin's program, with Krantz offering his analysis of the film; on Joey Bishop's talk show, and also on Johnny Carson's Tonight Show. Articles on the film appeared in Argosy, National Wildlife Magazine, and Reader's Digest.

One radio interview, with Gimlin, by Vancouver-based Jack Webster in November 1967, was partly recorded by John Green and reprinted in Loren Coleman's Bigfoot! Patterson also appeared on broadcast interviews on local stations near where his film would be shown during his four-walling tour in 1968.

Patterson subsequently sold overlapping distribution rights for the film to several parties, which resulted in costly legal entanglements.

After Patterson's death, Michael McLeod wrote, "With the consent of Al DeAtley and Patricia Patterson, the film distributor Ron Olson took over the operation of Northwest Research ... and changed its name to the North American Wildlife Research Association. ... He worked full-time compiling reports, soliciting volunteers to join the hunt, and organizing several small expeditions. A Bigfoot trap Olson and his crew built still survives. ... Olson ... continued to lobby the company [American National Enterprises] to produce a Bigfoot film. ... In 1974 ... ANE finally agreed. ... [It was released in 1975,] titled Bigfoot: Man or Beast. [H]e devised a storyline involving members of a Bigfoot research party. Olson spent several years exhibiting the film around the country. He planned to make millions with the film, but says it lost money." Olson is profiled in Barbara Wasson's Sasquatch Apparitions.

On November 25, 1974, CBS broadcast Monsters! Mystery or Myth, a documentary about the Loch Ness Monster and Bigfoot. It was co-produced by the Smithsonian Institution, which cancelled its contract with the producer the next year. The show attracted 50 million viewers. In 1975, Sunn Classic Pictures released Bigfoot: The Mysterious Monster aka The Mysterious Monsters, which remixed parts of Monsters! Mystery or Myth and another documentary called Land Of The Yeti, and also included footage from the Patterson–Gimlin film.

In September 2025, an emoji character officially titled "hairy creature" — in a pose identical to the film — was added to the Unicode standard.

=== Filmmaker-related ===
Patterson's expensive ($369) 16 mm camera had been rented on May 13 from photographer Harold Mattson at Sheppard's Camera Shop in Yakima, but he had kept it longer than the contract had stipulated, and an arrest warrant had been issued for him on October 17; he was arrested within weeks of his return from Bluff Creek. After Patterson returned the camera in working order in 1969, this charge was dismissed.

While Patterson sought publicity, Gimlin was conspicuous by his absence. He only briefly helped to promote the film and avoided discussing his Bigfoot encounter publicly for many subsequent years; he turned down requests for interviews. He later reported that he had avoided publicity after Patterson and promoter Al DeAtley had broken their agreement to pay him a one-third share of any profits generated by the film. Another factor was that his wife objected to publicity.

Daegling wrote, "Bigfoot advocates emphasize that Patterson remained an active Bigfoot hunter up until his death." For instance, in 1969, he hired a pair of brothers to travel around in a truck chasing down leads to Bigfoot witnesses and interviewing them. Later, in December of that year, he was one of those present in Bossburg, Washington, in the aftermath of the cripplefoot tracks found there. Krantz reports that "[a] few years after the film was made, Patterson received a letter from a man ["a US airman stationed in Thailand"] who assured him a Sasquatch was being held in a Buddhist monastery. Patterson spent most of his remaining money preparing an expedition to retrieve this creature" only to learn it was a hoax. He learned this only after having sent Dennis Jenson fruitlessly to Thailand (where he concluded that the airman was "mentally unbalanced") and then, after receiving a second untrue letter from the man, going himself to Thailand with Jenson.

To obtain money to travel to Thailand, "Patterson called Ron, who had returned to ANE, and sold the company the theatrical rights to the clip for what Olson described as a pretty good sum of money."

Patterson died of Hodgkin's lymphoma in 1972. According to Michael McLeod, Greg Long, and Bill Munns, "A few days before Roger died, he told Bigfoot-book author Peter C. Byrne that in retrospect...he [wished he] would have shot the thing and brought out a body instead of a reel of film." According to Grover Krantz and Robert Pyle, years later, Patterson and Gimlin both agreed they should have tried to kill the creature, both for financial gain and to silence naysayers.

In 1995, almost three decades after the Patterson–Gimlin filming, Greg Long, a technical writer for a technology firm who had a hobby of investigating and writing about Northwest mysteries, started years of interviewing people who knew Patterson, some of whom described him as a liar and a conman.

- "Marvin" (pseudonym), Jerry Lee Merritt, Pat Mason, Glen Koelling, and Bob Swanson suffered financially from their dealings with him, as well as 21 small local creditors who sued Patterson via a collection agency.
- Vilma Radford claimed Patterson never repaid a loan made to him for a Bigfoot movie Roger was planning. Radford had corroborative evidence: a $700 promissory note "for expenses in connection with filming of 'Bigfoot: America's Abominable Snowman.'" Patterson had agreed to repay her $850, plus 5 percent of any profits from the movie.
- In 1974, Bob Gimlin, with René Dahinden's financial assistance, sued DeAtley and Patterson's widow, Patricia, claiming he had not received his one-third share of the film's proceeds. He won his case in 1976.

== Copyright status ==
Greg Long reports that a 1978 legal "settlement gave Dahinden controlling rights—51 percent of the film footage, 51 percent of video cassette rights, and 100 percent of all 952 frames of the footage. Patty Patterson had 100 percent of all TV rights and 49 percent rights in the film footage. Dahinden had ... bought out Gimlin, who himself had received nothing from Patterson; and Mason and Radford, promised part of the profits by Patterson, had nothing to show for their investment or efforts."

== Ownership of the physical films ==
=== First reel ===
The whereabouts of the original is unknown, although there are several speculations as to what happened to it.

- Patterson had ceded ownership of the original to American National Enterprises, which went bankrupt a few years after his death in 1972. Thereafter, Greg Long writes, "Peregrine Entertainment bought the company. Then Peregrine was bought by Century Group of Los Angeles. When Century Group went bankrupt in 1996, Byrne rushed to Deerfield Beach, Florida, where an accountant was auctioning off the company's assets to pay creditors. The company's films were in storage in Los Angeles, but a search failed to turn up the Patterson footage."
- In 2008, Chris Murphy thought a Florida lawyer might have the film, not realizing until later that the lawyer had contacted the Los Angeles storage company that held it, and that it had responded that the film was not in the location the lawyer's records indicated.
- Bill Munns writes that it was "last seen by researchers René Dahinden and Bruce Bonney in 1980, when René convinced the film vault [in Southern California] holding it to release it to him". He made Cibachrome images from it. Sometime between then and 1996, the film went missing from its numbered location in the vault.

At least seven copies were made of the original film.

Bill Munns listed four other missing reels of derivative works that would be helpful to film analysts.

=== Second reel ===
The second reel, showing Patterson and Gimlin making and displaying plaster casts of some footprints, was not shown in conjunction with the first reel at Al DeAtley's house, according to those who were there. Chris Murphy wrote, "I believe the screening of this roll at the University of British Columbia on October 26, 1967, was the first and last major screening." It has subsequently been lost. John Green suspects that Al DeAtley has it.

A ten-foot strip from that reel, or from a copy of that reel, from which still images were taken by Chris Murphy, still exists, but it, too, has gone missing.

== Filming speed ==
One factor that complicates discussion of the Patterson film is that Patterson said he normally filmed at 24 frames per second, but in his haste to capture the Bigfoot on film, he did not note the camera's setting. His Cine-Kodak K-100 camera had markings on its continuously variable dial at 16, 24, 32, 48, and 64 frames per second, but no click-stops, and was capable of filming at any frame speed within this range. Grover Krantz wrote, "Patterson clearly told John Green that he found, after the filming, that the camera was set on 18 frames per second (fps). ... " It has been suggested that Patterson simply misread "16" as "18".

- "Dr. D.W. Grieve, an anatomist with expertise in human biomechanics ... evaluated the various possibilities" regarding film speed and did not come to a conclusion between them. He "confessed to being perplexed and unsettled" by "the tangible possibility that it [the film subject] was real".
- John Napier, a primatologist, claimed that "if the movie was filmed at 24 frame/s then the creature's walk cannot be distinguished from a normal human walk. If it was filmed at 16 or 18 frame/s, there are a number of important respects in which it is quite unlike man's gait." Napier, who published before Dahinden and Krantz, contended it was "likely that Patterson would have used 24 frame/s" because it "is best suited to TV transmission," while conceding that "this is entirely speculative." In fact 24 frames a second is the rate used in motion pictures, and 30 frames a second is best suited to US TV's requirements.
- Krantz argued, on the basis of an analysis by Igor Bourtsev, that since Patterson's height is known (5 ft 2 in or 5 ft 3 in [157 or 160 cm]), a reasonable calculation can be made of his pace. This running pace can be synchronized with the regular bounces in the initial jumpy portions of the film that were caused by each fast step Patterson took to approach the creature. On the basis of this analysis, Krantz argued that a speed of 24 frames per second can be quickly dismissed and that "[we] may safely rule out 16 frames per second and accept the speed of 18."
- René Dahinden stated that "the footage of the horses prior to the Bigfoot film looks jerky and unnatural when projected at 24 frame/s." And Dahinden experimented at the film site by having people walk rapidly over the creature's path and reported: "None of us ... could walk that distance in 40 seconds [952 frames / 24 frame/s = 39.6 s], ... so I eliminated 24 frame/s."
- Bill Munns wrote, "One researcher, Bill Miller, found technical data from a Kodak technician that stated the K-100 cameras were tweaked so even when the dial is set to 16 fps, the camera actually runs at 18 fps. ... I have nine K-100 cameras now. ... I tried it on one camera, and got 18 fps, but the rest still need testing [and all with "film running through the camera"]."

== Analysis ==
A stabilized high quality version of the film.

The Patterson–Gimlin film has seen relatively little interest from mainstream scientists. Statements of scientists who viewed the film at a screening, or who conducted a study, are reprinted in Chris Murphy's Bigfoot Film Journal. Typical objections include: neither humans nor chimpanzees have hairy breasts as does the figure in the film, and Napier has noted that a sagittal crest is "only very occasionally seen, to an insignificant extent, in chimpanzee females". Critics have argued these features are evidence against authenticity. Krantz countered the latter point, saying "a sagittal crest ... is a consequence of absolute size alone."

As anthropologist David Daegling writes, "[t]he skeptics have not felt compelled to offer much of a detailed argument against the film; the burden of proof, rightly enough, should lie with the advocates." Yet, without a detailed argument against authenticity, Daegling notes that "the film has not gone away." Similarly, Krantz argues that of the many opinions offered about the Patterson film, "[o]nly a few of these opinions are based on technical expertise and careful study of the film itself."

Regarding the quality of the film, second-generation copies or copies from TV and DVD productions are inferior to first-generation copies. Many early frames are blurry due to camera shake, and the quality of subsequent frames varies for the same reason. Stabilization of the film (e.g., by M. K. Davis) to counter the effect of camera shake has improved viewers' ability to analyze it. Regarding "graininess," Bill Munns writes, "Based on transparencies taken off the camera original, ... the PGF original is as fine grain as any color 16mm film can achieve." He adds that graininess increases as images are magnified.

Several special-effects experts have said that what is seen in the film would certainly have been possible in the 1960s, especially given that the footage is at a distance, out of focus and blurry, conditions that can obscure details. They note that earlier films, including Are You With It? (1948), featured comparatively realistic gorilla suits and that Hollywood productions of the era, such as Planet of the Apes (1968), used sophisticated ape costumes and makeup.

Supporters of the film have argued that its authenticity is supported by the absence of successful recreations. Skeptical researchers counter that no documented attempts have been made using period accurate equipment, comparable locations, or professionally constructed suits. Critics also argue that the lack of modern footage of similar quality raises questions about why the most cited Bigfoot film dates to the late 1960s.

=== Scientists' studies ===
==== Bernard Heuvelmans ====
Bernard Heuvelmans—a zoologist and the so-called "father of cryptozoology"—thought the creature in the Patterson film was a suited human. He objected to the film subject's hair-flow pattern as being too uniform; to the hair on the breasts as not being like a primate; to its buttocks as being insufficiently separated; and to its too-calm retreat from the pursuing men.

==== John Napier ====
Prominent primate expert John Napier (one-time director of the Smithsonian's Primate Biology Program) was one of the few mainstream scientists not only to critique the Patterson–Gimlin film but also to study then-available Bigfoot evidence in a generally sympathetic manner, in his 1973 book, Bigfoot: The Sasquatch and Yeti in Myth and Reality.

Napier conceded the likelihood of Bigfoot as a real creature, stating, "I am convinced that Sasquatch exists." But he argued against the film being genuine: "There is little doubt that the scientific evidence taken collectively points to a hoax of some kind. The creature shown in the film does not stand up well to functional analysis." Napier gives several reasons for his and others' skepticism that are commonly raised, but apparently his main reasons are original with him. First, the length of "the footprints are totally at variance with its calculated height". Second, the footprints are of the "hourglass" type, of which he is suspicious. (In response, Barbara Wasson criticized Napier's logic at length.)

He adds, "I could not see the zipper; and I still can't. There I think we must leave the matter. Perhaps it was a man dressed up in a monkey-skin; if so it was a brilliantly executed hoax and the unknown perpetrator will take his place with the great hoaxers of the world. Perhaps it was the first film of a new type of hominid, quite unknown to science, in which case Roger Patterson deserves to rank with Dubois, the discoverer of Pithecanthropus erectus, or Raymond Dart of Johannesburg, the man who introduced the world to its immediate human ancestor, Australopithecus africanus."

The skeptical views of Grieve and Napier are summarized favorably (and those of Bayanov and Donskoy negatively) by Kenneth Wylie in Appendix A of his 1980 book, Bigfoot: A Personal Inquiry into a Phenomenon.

==== Esteban Sarmiento ====
Esteban Sarmiento, an American Museum of Natural History specialist in physical anthropology with 25 years of experience with great apes in the wild at the time of writing, noted: "I did find some inconsistencies in appearance and behavior that might suggest a fake ... but nothing that conclusively shows that this is the case." His most original criticism is: "The plantar surface of the feet is decidedly pale, but the palm of the hand seems to be dark. There is no mammal I know of in which the plantar sole differs so drastically in color from the palm." His most controversial statements have been: "The gluteals, although large, fail to show a humanlike cleft (or crack)." "Body proportions: ... In all of the [examined] relative values, bigfoot is well within the human range and differs markedly from any living ape and from the 'australopithecine' fossils." (E.g., the IM index is in the normal human range.) And: "I estimate bigfoot's weight to be between 190 and 240 lbs [85 and 110 kg]."

==== David J. Daegling and Daniel O. Schmitt ====
When anthropologists David J. Daegling of the University of Florida and Daniel O. Schmitt examined the film, they wrote that it was impossible to conclusively determine whether the subject in the film is nonhuman, and additionally argued that flaws in the studies by Krantz and others invalidated their claims. Daegling and Schmitt noted problems of uncertainties in the subject and camera positions, camera movement, poor image quality, and artifacts of the subject. They concluded: "Based on our analysis of gait and problems inherent in estimating subject dimensions, it is our opinion that it is not possible to evaluate the identity of the film subject with any confidence."

Daegling has asserted that the creature's odd walk could be replicated: "Supposed peculiarities of subject speed, stride length, and posture are all reproducible by a human being employing this type of locomotion [a "compliant gait"]."

Daegling noted that in 1967, movie and television special effects were primitive compared to the more sophisticated effects in later decades, and allowed that if the Patterson film depicts a man in a suit then "it is not unreasonable to suggest that it is better than some of the tackier monster outfits that got thrown together for television at that time."

==== Jessica Rose and James Gamble ====
Jessica Rose and James Gamble operate the Motion and Gait Analysis Lab at Stanford University and are authors of "the definitive text on human gait", Human Walking. They conducted a high-tech attempt at human replication of the walk of "Patty", in cooperation with Jeff Meldrum. Rose was certain their subject had matched the gait in the film, even calling it "a slam dunk" while Gamble was not quite as sure. Meldrum was impressed and acknowledged that "some aspects" of the creature's walk had been replicated, but not all. The narrator said, "even the experts can see the gait test could not replicate all parameters of the gait". It was shown in an episode of the Discovery Channel's Best Evidence series.

==== MonsterQuest ====
A first-season episode of MonsterQuest focuses on the Bigfoot phenomenon. One pair of scientists, Jurgen Konczak (director, Human Sensorimotor Control Laboratory, University of Minnesota) and Esteban Sarmiento, attempts and fails to get a mime outfitted with LEDs on his joints to mimic the Patterson Bigfoot's gait. A second pair, Daris Swindler and Owen Caddy, employs digital enhancement and observes facial movements, such as moving eyelids, lips that compress like an upset chimp's, and a mouth that is lower than it appears, due to a false-lip anomaly like that of a chimp. The episode concludes, "the new findings are intriguing but inconclusive, until a body is found".

=== Film industry personnel ===
==== Movie production companies' executives ====
- Dale Sheets and Universal Studios. Patterson, Gimlin, and DeAtley screened the film for Dale Sheets, head of the Documentary Film Department, and unnamed technicians "in the special effects department at Universal Studios in Hollywood ... Their conclusion was: 'We could try (faking it), but we would have to create a completely new system of artificial muscles and find an actor who could be trained to walk like that. It might be done, but we would have to say that it would be almost impossible.'" A more moderate version of their opinion was, "if it is [a man in an ape suit], it's a very good one—a job that would take a lot of time and money to produce."
- Disney executive Ken Peterson. Krantz reports that in 1969, John Green (who owned a first-generation copy of the original Patterson film) interviewed Disney executive Ken Peterson, who, after viewing the Patterson film, asserted "that their technicians would not be able to duplicate the film". Krantz argues that if Disney personnel were unable to duplicate the film, there is little likelihood that Patterson could have done so. Greg Long writes, "Byrne cited his trip to Walt Disney studios in 1972, where Disney's chief of animation and four assistants viewed Patterson's footage and praised it as a beautiful piece of work although, they said, it must have been shot in a studio. When Byrne told them it had been shot in the woods of Northern California, 'They shook their heads and walked away.'"

==== Bill Munns ====
Bill Munns was a special effects and make-up artist, cameraman, and film editor. He argues that Universal and Disney were not the most knowledgeable studios to consult with. He says that Fox, MGM, and special effects artist Stuart Freeborn in England, "who had just completed his groundbreaking ape suits for 2001: A Space Odyssey", would have been preferable.

Munns started posting his online analysis of the film in 2009 and summarizing it in the online Munns Report. In 2013 he and Jeff Meldrum co-authored three papers in Meldrum's online magazine, Relict Hominoid Inquiry. In 2014, Munns self-published When Roger Met Patty, a 488-page book incorporating material from those articles that analyzes the film and film subject from various perspectives.

He argues the film depicts a non-human animal, not a man in a fur suit. He proposes a new diagnostic test of authenticity, at the armpit: natural concave skin fold vs. artificial vertical crease. Munns' analysis has been featured in an episode of the History Channel series MonsterQuest.

==== Other special effects artists ====
- Rick Baker. Famed Hollywood creator of Harry (from the movie, Harry and the Hendersons), Rick Baker, told Geraldo Rivera's Now It Can Be Told show (in 1992) that "it looked like cheap, fake fur," after seeing the subject in Patterson's filmstrip. Baker said that John Chambers had "a crappy walkaround suit," that he sold as "a gag to be played on the guy that shot it [the film]". Later on, Baker's studio stated in a fax, "He no longer believes this [that Chambers made the suit] is true."
- Ellis Burman. The Guenettes (Robert & Frances) wrote of him, "I also spoke to Ellis Burman of Burman Studios in Hollywood, creators of all kinds of strange creatures, including a fake Bigfoot for a traveling 'pickled punk' carnival exhibit. Burman denied his company created the Patterson Bigfoot, but did say he could duplicate it—but for more than $10,000 in total costs."
- John Chambers. Academy Award-winning monster-maker John Chambers is most famous for his innovative flexible masks in Planet of the Apes (1968). In a 1997 interview in a nursing home with Bigfooter Bobbie Short in her nurse's uniform, he denied rumors that he had created a costume for the Patterson subject, saying "I'm good, but not that good."

Some time before 1976 the Guenettes reported that, in answer to their questions, "He concluded that if the creature is a man in a suit, then it is no ordinary gorilla suit. It is not something they bought or rented in a store; it would have to be something tailor made. He also felt like it might have been made out of real animal fur."

- Janos Prohaska. After viewing the Patterson–Gimlin film with John Green, costume designer and ape-suit mime Janos Prohaska (noted for his work in the late-1960s television programs Star Trek and Lost in Space) concluded the film's subject looked real to him. When asked if he thought the film was faked, Prohaska replied, "I don't think so ... to me it looks very, very real." If the film was hoaxed, Prohaska thought, it was remarkably realistic and sophisticated, and the best costume he had ever seen, and the only plausible explanation was that someone might have glued false hair "directly to the actor's skin".

However, film critic David Daegling speculates that the same effect could be had by gluing the hair to a set of tight but expandable, waffle-design long johns.

- Chris Walas. Academy Award-winning "makeup artist Chris [Walas] in the BigfootForums [site] (in 2004) presented a theory that the arching hip line represents the overlap line between a fur costume leggings section and the torso section. ... "
- Stan Winston. Academy Award-winning film special effects supervisor and makeup artist Stan Winston, after viewing the PGF, said "it's a guy in a bad hair suit, sorry!" He also added that "if one of my colleagues created this for a movie, he would be out of business." He went on to comment that the suit in the film could have been made today for "a couple hundred dollars" or "under a thousand, in that day". He then named and hinted Janos Prohaska as possibly being the creator of the suit.

=== Other analysts ===
==== Nike researcher Gordon Valient ====
Krantz also showed the film to Gordon Valient, a researcher for Nike shoes, who he says "made some rather useful observations about some rather unhuman movements he could see".

==== Cliff Crook and Chris Murphy ====
A computerized visual analysis of the video conducted by Cliff Crook, who once devoted rooms to sasquatch memorabilia in his home in Bothell, Washington, and Chris Murphy, a Canadian Bigfoot buff from Vancouver, British Columbia, was released in January 1999 and exposed an object which appeared to be the suit's zip-fastener. Zooming in on four magnified frames of the 16 mm footage video exposed what appeared to be tracings of a bell-shaped fastener on the creature's waist area, presumably used to hold a person's suit together. Since both Crook and Murphy were previously staunch supporters of the video's authenticity, Associated Press journalist John M. Hubbell noted: "Longtime enthusiasts smell a deserter."

== Hoax allegations ==
=== Patterson and/or Gimlin ===
- In a 1999 telephone interview with television producer Chris Packham for the BBC's The X Creatures, Gimlin said that for some time, "I was totally convinced no one could fool me. And of course I'm an older man now ... and I think there could have been the possibility [of a hoax]. But it would have to be really well planned by Roger [Patterson]."
- Author Greg Long uncovered circumstantial evidence of footprint hoaxing, and possibly even sighting and photo hoaxing, in the Yakima vicinity by Patterson. Long argues that this means that he faked the film.

(One possible motive for the Yakima fakery would have been to make Bigfoot seem more real to local millionaire Floyd Paxton, with whom he was acquainted and from whom he hoped to obtain funding for an expedition.)
The film's proponents' position is that what is seen in the film would not be possible to fake, especially by an inexperienced costume maker like Patterson. Most of Bill Munns' book makes detailed examinations of film features that he argues could not have been created with 1967 special effects technology. He filmed recreation attempts of his own that failed. Daniel Perez, writing in 1992, asserted "If the film is in fact a fake, a costumed man or a machine, surely science could duplicate the film with ease. Twenty-five years later, no one has come close." He later asserted, "It has never been convincingly replicated. To any thinking person, that should speak volumes."
Greg Long's response was, "The film they have just isn't going to do it. I'm sorry. That's not evidence."

- David Daegling, anthropologist, writes that the "more cynical skeptics" see Patterson's luck as "more than a little suspicious: He sets out to make a Bigfoot documentary, then almost literally stumbles across a Bigfoot." Daegling, however, offers the benefit of the doubt, noting that Patterson's reasoning is sound: In seeking something elusive, he went to where it had been reported. Bluff Creek had also been the site of well-known Bigfoot hoaxer Ray Wallace's activities in 1958. In Patterson's book, he mentions meeting Wallace once. Later, Daegling cites certain features in the film and the storyline as suspicious.
- Krantz thought Patterson might have perpetrated such a hoax, given the opportunity and resources. (Roger was an accomplished 2-D artist whose drawings and painting of horses and other wildlife showed a detailed understanding of musculature and anatomy.) But he also argued that Patterson had "nowhere near the knowledge or facilities to do so—nor for that matter, did anyone else ... When I talked about some of the more technical details of biomechanics, he (Patterson) showed the familiar blank look of a student who had lost the drift of the explanation, but was still trying hard to pay attention. Yet he must have known all these details to create a hoax. For instance, he could see the anterior position of the front of the shin, but how that related to foot leverage was quite beyond him."
- Peter C. Byrne, who interviewed Patterson and Gimlin many times, wrote, "both men lacked, primarily, the intellectual capacity essential to the production of a hoax ... termed a masterpiece." Similarly, Daegling writes that "Most acquaintances of Patterson volunteered that neither he nor Gimlin were clever enough to put something that detailed together."

=== Philip Morris ===
In 2002, Philip Morris, owner of Morris Costumes (a North Carolina–based company offering costumes, props and stage products) claimed that he made a gorilla costume that was used in the Patterson film. Morris says he discussed his role in the hoax "at costume conventions, lectures, [and] magician conventions" in the 1980s, but first addressed the public at large on August 16, 2002, on Charlotte, North Carolina, radio station WBT. His story was also printed in The Charlotte Observer. Morris claims he was reluctant to expose the hoax earlier for fear of harming his business: giving away a performer's secrets, he said, would be widely regarded as disreputable.

Morris said that he sold an ape suit to Patterson via mail order in 1967, thinking it was going to be used in what Patterson described as a "prank". (Ordinarily the gorilla suits he sold were used for a popular sideshow routine that depicted an attractive woman, supposedly from some far-flung corner of the globe, being altered by a sorcerer or scientist into a gorilla or otherwise apelike monster.) After the initial sale, Morris said that Patterson telephoned him asking how to make the "shoulders more massive" and the "arms longer". Morris says he suggested that whoever wore the suit should wear football shoulder pads and hold sticks in his hands within the suit.

As for the creature's walk, Morris said:

The Bigfoot researchers say that no human can walk that way in the film. Oh, yes they can! When you're wearing long clown's feet, you can't place the ball of your foot down first. You have to put your foot down flat. Otherwise, you'll stumble. Another thing, when you put on the gorilla head, you can only turn your head maybe a quarter of the way. And to look behind you, you've got to turn your head and your shoulders and your hips. Plus, the shoulder pads in the suit are in the way of the jaw. That's why the Bigfoot turns and looks the way he does in the film. He has to twist his entire upper body.

Morris's wife and business partner Amy had vouched for her husband and claims to have helped frame the suit. Morris offered no evidence apart from his own testimony to support his account, the most conspicuous shortcoming being the absence of a gorilla suit or documentation that would match the detail evidenced in the film and could have been produced in 1967.

A recreation of the PGF was undertaken on October 6, 2004, at "Cow Camp," near Rimrock Lake, a location 41 miles (66 km) west of Yakima. This was six months after the publication of Long's book and 11 months after Long had first contacted Morris. Bigfooter Daniel Perez wrote, "National Geographic's [producer] Noel Dockster ... noted the suit used in the re-creation ... was in no way similar to what was depicted in the P–G film."

Morris would not consent to release the video to National Geographic, the recreation's sponsor, claiming he had not had adequate time to prepare and that the month was in the middle of his busy season.

=== Bob Heironimus ===
Bob Heironimus claims to have been the figure depicted in the Patterson film. Heironimus says he had not previously publicly discussed his role in the hoax because he hoped to be paid eventually and was afraid of being convicted of fraud had he confessed. After speaking with his lawyer he was told that since he had not been paid for his involvement in the hoax, he could not be held accountable.

A month after watching the December 28, 1998, Fox-television special World's Greatest Hoaxes: Secrets Finally Revealed?, he went public, via a January 30 press release by his lawyer, Barry Woodard, in a Yakima newspaper story. He stated, "I'm telling the truth. I'm tired after thirty-seven years." Five days later, a second newspaper story reported that his "lawyer's office has been inundated with calls from media outlets. ... 'We're just sort of waiting for the dust to settle,' he said, explaining he and his client are evaluating offers." He also said, "We anticipate that we will be telling the full story to somebody rather quickly."

Heironimus's name was first publicly revealed, and his allegations first publicly detailed, five years later, in Greg Long's book, The Making of Bigfoot, which includes testimony that corroborates Heironimus's claims:

- Heironimus's relatives (his mother Opal and nephew John Miller) claim to have seen an ape suit in Heironimus's car. Opal said she saw the suit two days after the film was shot.
- Russ Bohannon, a longtime friend, says that Heironimus revealed the hoax privately in 1968 or 1969.
- Bernard Hammermeister, another longtime friend, said he was shown an ape suit in Heironimus's car. No date was given by Long for Hammermeister's observation, but it apparently came well after the relatives' observation, as implied by the word "still" in the justification Heironimus gave Hammermeister for requesting his silence: "There was still supposed to be a payola on this thing, and he didn't have it."

Long argues that the suit Morris says he sold to Patterson was the same suit Heironimus claims to have worn in the Patterson film. However, Long quotes Heironimus and Morris describing different ape suits in many respects. Among the notable differences are:

- Suit Material: Horsehide vs. Dynel. Heironimus says he was told by his brother Howard that Patterson claimed he manufactured the suit from horsehide. When Long asked how heavy the suit was, Bob replied, "It weighed maybe twenty, twenty-five pounds [9, 11 kg]. ... Horsehide would be heavy." Bob added, "It stunk. Roger skinned out a dead, red horse."

But Morris reports that the suit was made of Dynel, a lighter-weight synthetic material with little or no odor. Morris said that it was his "standard suit that we sold to all our customers" that cost $435 (cheaper than the competition).

Another contrast is that Howard reported that the horsehide was a "real dark brown" and Long writes that Morris "was using brown Dynel in 1967". But Morris wouldn't have wanted a "real dark" brown color, as he chose brown to contrast against the black background of the girl-to-gorilla illusion.

- Suit: Top-and-Trousers vs. a Back-Zipped Onesie. Heironimus described the suit as having no metal pieces and an upper "torso part" that he donned "like putting on a T-shirt". At Bluff Creek he put on "the top". Asked about the "bottom portion," he guessed it was cinched with a drawstring.
- Hands and Feet: Suit-Attached vs. Separate. Heironimus described the suit as having hands and feet that were attached to the arms and legs.

But Morris made a suit whose hands and feet were separate pieces. Long speculates that Patterson riveted or glued these parts to the suit, but offers no evidence to support this idea. If Patterson had done so, he must have done it before Heironimus did his test fitting and walk (because Heironimus describes a three-piece suit—head, torso, and legs, omitting separate hands and feet)—i.e., without adjusting their location to his dimensions. And Heironimus never described being measured beforehand.

Long speculates that Patterson modified the costume, but only by attaching Morris's loose hands and feet to the costume, and by replacing Morris's mask.

Some film proponents say that Heironimus's arms are too short to match that of a Bigfoot and that he was a few inches shorter than the creature on the film (up to 14 inches or 36 cm shorter).

But Heironimus said that he wore football shoulder pads, which might explain why the shoulders and arms appear to be out of proportion to the rest of the body. However, Heironimus disclaimed the use of arm-extending sticks in his costume and said that he wore "gloves, a little bit longer than my actual hands were . ... "

=== Ray Wallace ===
After the death of Ray Wallace in 2002, following a request by Loren Coleman to The Seattle Times reporter Bob Young to investigate, the family of Wallace went public with claims that he had started the Bigfoot phenomenon with fake footprints (made from a wooden foot-shaped cutout) left in Californian sites in 1958.

- Mark Chorvinsky, editor of Strange magazine, promoted Wallace's claim that he tipped off Patterson exactly where to look for a Bigfoot. Chorvinsky wrote, "'Roger Patterson came [over] dozens of times pumping me on this Bigfoot,' Ray Wallace explained to researcher Dennis Pilchis in 1982. 'I felt sorry for Roger Patterson. He told me he had cancer of the lymph glands and he was desperately broke and he wanted to try to get something where he could have a little income. Well, he went down there exactly where I told him. I told him, 'You go down there and hang around on that bank. Stay up there and watch that spot.'" David Daegling summarized Chorvinsky's argument and concluded that Wallace "had a degree of involvement" with the Patterson–Gimlin film, and that this gave grounds for suspicion of it.
- Loren Coleman has written that Patterson was an early Bigfoot investigator, and that it was only natural that he sought out and interviewed older Bigfoot-event principals, which included Wallace, because of the 1958 Bluff Creek track incidents. Coleman has asserted that Wallace had nothing to do with Patterson's footage in 1967, and has argued in an analysis of the media treatment of the death of Wallace that the international media inappropriately confused the Wallace films of the 1970s with the Patterson–Gimlin 1967 film.
- Meldrum has written extensively about Wallace, his allegations (continued by his family after his death), and the significant problems with them in his book, Sasquatch: Legend Meets Science.

=== Capturing Bigfoot ===
In March 2026, the documentary film Capturing Bigfoot premiered at the South by Southwest (SXSW) film festival. The documentary argues that 1967 Patterson–Gimlin film is a hoax orchestrated by the filmmakers. Director Marq Evans discovered a 40-second clip that was reported to have been shot in 1966, which the documentary suggested to show a dress rehearsal of a Bigfoot figure walking through a wooded area similar to the location of the 1967 film. It was released on Amazon Prime Video on October 20, 2026—the day the Patterson–Gimlin film marks its 59th anniversary. Interviews with Patricia and Clint Patterson, Roger Patterson's wife and son, also feature in the Capturing Bigfoot documentary, in which they confess that the Patterson-Gimlin footage was a hoax. Pat DeAtley, widow to businessman Al DeAtley who funded Patterson's Bigfoot venture, also features and confessed that the famous footage was a hoax.

=== Books on the subject ===
The major hoax allegations are summarized and criticized in:

- Two of Christopher Murphy's books.
- Loren Coleman's Bigfoot!: The True Story of Apes in America.
- David Daegling's Bigfoot Exposed.

== See also ==
- List of photographs considered the most important
- Peter C. Byrne

== Bibliography ==
=== Skeptical ===
- Joshua Blu Buhs (2009). Bigfoot: The Life and Times of a Legend. University of Chicago Press. pp. 131–56, 187–92. ISBN 978-0-226-07979-0.
- David Daegling (2004). Bigfoot Exposed: An Anthropologist Examines America's Enduring Legend. Altamira Press. pp. 105–55. ISBN 0-7591-0539-1.
- Greg Long (2004). The Making of Bigfoot: The Inside Story. Prometheus Books. ISBN 1-59102-139-1.
- Michael McLeod (2009). "Part II, Obsession". Anatomy of a Beast: Obsession and Myth on the Trail of Bigfoot. University of California Press. pp. 79–141. ISBN 978-0-520-25571-5.
- John Napier (1973). Bigfoot: The Sasquatch and Yeti in Myth and Reality. E. P. Dutton. pp. 89–96, 126, 203. ISBN 0-525-06658-6.

=== Other by scientists ===
- Dmitri Bayanov (1997). America's Bigfoot: Fact, Not Fiction. Moscow: Crypto-Logos. ISBN 5-900229-22-X.
- Jeff Glickman (1999). Toward a Resolution of the Bigfoot Phenomenon (PDF). North American Science Institute / PHOTEK. pp. 10–22.
- Grover Krantz (1999) [1992]. Bigfoot Sasquatch Evidence (originally "Big Footprints: A Scientific Inquiry Into the Reality of Sasquatch"). Hancock House. pp. 87–124, 300–14. ISBN 0-88839-447-0.
- Vladimir Markotic; Grover Krantz, eds. (1984). The Sasquatch and Other Unknown Hominids (OP). Calgary: Western Publishers. pp. 174–85, 218–35.
- Jeff Meldrum (2007). Sasquatch: Legend Meets Science. Forge Books. pp. 137–78. ISBN 978-0765312174.
- Robert Michael Pyle (1995). Where Bigfoot Walks: Crossing the Dark Divide. Houghton Mifflin. pp. 207–11. ISBN 0-395-44114-5.
- Ivan Sanderson (1969). More "Things". Pyramid Books. pp. 65–79.

=== Other by non-scientists ===
- Peter Byrne (1975). The Search for Big Foot: Monster, Myth or Man?. Acropolis Books. pp. 133–66. ISBN 0-87491-159-1.
- Thom Cantrall (2013). Sasquatch: The Search for a New Man. The Prologue contains an interview of Bob Gimlin and a transcript of a talk by him at a 2010 Ohio Bigfoot Conference. CreateSpace. pp. 4–24. ISBN 978-1490567846.
- Loren Coleman; Jerome Clark (1999). Cryptozoology A to Z. Fireside Books. pp. 55–56, 197–200. ISBN 0-684-85602-6.
- —— (2003). Bigfoot! The True Story of Apes in America. Paraview Pocket Books. pp. 81–110. ISBN 0-7434-6975-5.
- Loren Coleman (2007). "Bigfoot's Bogus Burial: The Media and Other Wallace Myths". In Greg Taylor (ed.). Darklore Volume 1. Brisbane, Australia: Daily Grail Publishing. pp. 95–109. ISBN 978-0-9757200-1-1.
- John Green (2006) [1978]. Sasquatch: The Apes Among Us. Hancock House. pp. 113–31. ISBN 0-88839-018-1.
- Robert & Frances Guenette (1975). The Mysterious Monsters. Sun Classics. pp. 113–25.
- Don Hunter, with René Dahinden (1993) [1973]. Sasquatch/Bigfoot: The Search for North America's Incredible Creature. Firefly Books. pp. 114–25, 172–78. ISBN 1-895565-28-6.
- William Munns (2014). When Roger Met Patty: 1 Minute of Film ... 47 Years of Controversy. self-published. ISBN 978-1500534028.
- Christopher Murphy (2008). Bigfoot Film Journal: A Detailed Account & Analysis of the Patterson/Gimlin Film Circumstances. Hancock House. ISBN 978-0-88839-658-7.
- —— (2009). Know the Sasquatch/Bigfoot: Sequel and Update to Meet the Sasquatch. Hancock House. pp. 42–103. ISBN 978-0-88839-689-1.
- Roger Patterson & Chris Murphy (2005) [1966]. The Bigfoot Film Controversy (contains Patterson's 1966 book, Do Abominable Snowmen of America Really Exist?). Illustrated by Roger Patterson. Hancock House. ISBN 0-88839-581-7.
- Daniel Perez (2003) [1992]. Bigfoot at Bluff Creek. Bigfoot Times. ISBN 99948-943-2-3.
- Marian Place (1974). On the Track of Bigfoot. Dodd, Mead. pp. 134–44. ISBN 0-396-06883-9.
- Barbara Wasson (1979). Sasquatch Apparitions: A Critique on the Pacific Northwest Hominoid. self-published. pp. 65–85. ISBN 0-9614105-0-7.
- Tate Hieronymus (2018). Interview with Bob Gimlin in front of the big tree, visible in frame 352 of the Patterson - Gimlin Film. The full interview can only be seen at Cliff Barakman’s “North American Bigfoot Center” in Boring, OR.
