= Raymond L. Wallace =

Bigfoot hoaxer (1918–2002)

Ray Wallace
- Born: Raymond L. Wallace; April 21, 1918; Clarksdale, Missouri, U.S.
- Died: November 26, 2002 (aged 84); Centralia, Washington, U.S.
- Known for: Bigfoot hoaxing

Raymond L. Wallace (April 21, 1918 − November 26, 2002) was an American amateur Bigfoot hoaxer.

Wallace was born in Clarksdale, Missouri. He worked as a logger for much of his life, but also in road construction throughout much of Washington, Oregon and California. He served in the United States Army during World War II as an aircraft gunner. Wallace finally settled in Toledo, Washington in 1961.

== Bigfoot ==
In August 1958, the Humboldt Times of Eureka, California, was the first to use the term "Bigfoot" in their story about huge footprints found by a worker of Wallace's Humboldt County construction company.

Upon Wallace's death, his son Michael revealed that Wallace was in possession of large, poorly crafted, obviously fake wooden feet. According to Wallace's family, Ray's brother Wilbur Wallace and nephew Mack McKinley used these wooden feet to stamp imprints around northern California as a prank. Ray Wallace also created hair and feces samples which the family left in the woods for Bigfoot researchers to find. He created the hair samples by processing hair from the bison he kept on his wild animal farm near Toledo. However, Chris Murphy notes that Ed Schillinger, "who is the only living witness from the Bluff Creek job" and "who considers himself almost an adopted son of the man [Ray]," strongly disputes the family's allegations.

Cryptozoologist Mark A. Hall was a persistent critic of the authenticity of Crew's 1958 tracks, and of certain other Bluff Creek tracks. Another cryptozoologist, Loren Coleman, has been similarly critical.

Regarding Wallace's claim to have told Roger Patterson where to go to shoot the Patterson film, Jeffrey Meldrum writes, "... but it was clear from later interviews that he possessed little knowledge of the specific area ...."

== Death ==
Wallace died in a Centralia, Washington nursing home at the age of 84.

== See also ==
- Bigfoot in popular culture
- Jacko hoax

== Other reading ==
- Buhs, Joshua Blu (August 1, 2009). Bigfoot: The Life and Times of a Legend. University of Chicago Press. pp. 73, 76, 82–86, 105–06, 209, 241–42, 248, 251–52. ISBN 978-0-226-50215-1.
- Coleman, Loren (2003). Bigfoot!: The True Story of Apes in America. Paraview Pocket Books. pp. 67–80, 222. ISBN 0-7434-6975-5.
- Daegling, David J. (2004). Bigfoot Exposed: An Anthropologist Examines America's Enduring Legend. Altamira Press. pp. 35, 73–76, 99n36, 117, 180–82, 256–58. ISBN 0-7591-0539-1.
- Green, John (2004) [1968, 1970]. The Best of Sasquatch Bigfoot: the latest scientific developments plus all of On the Track of the Sasquatch and Encounters with Bigfoot. Hancock House. pp. 10–15. ISBN 0-88839-546-9.
- Daniel Loxton; Donald Prothero (2013). Abominable Science: Origins of the Yeti, Nessie, and Other Famous Cryptids. Columbia University Press. pp. 40–44, 48, 60. ISBN 978-0-231-15320-1.
- Michael McLeod (2009). Anatomy of a Beast: Obsession and Myth on the Trail of Bigfoot. University of California Press. pp. 46–47, 49, 51, 103–05, 164–66, 175–78. ISBN 978-0-520-25571-5.
- Jeff Meldrum (2006). Sasquatch: Legend Meets Science. Forge Books. pp. 55–71, 242, 272, 274. ISBN 978-0765312174.
- Christopher Murphy (2009). Know the Sasquatch/Bigfoot: Sequel and Update to Meet the Sasquatch. Hancock House. pp. 100, 125–26, 141–46, 228, 243, 267. ISBN 978-0-88839-689-1.
- Place, Marian (1974). On the Track of Bigfoot. Dodd, Mead. pp. 28–34, 39–40, 55. ISBN 0-396-06883-9.
- Robert Michael Pyle (1995). Where Bigfoot Walks: Crossing the Dark Divide. Houghton Mifflin. pp. 188–91, 194–96, 198, 200, 203, 206–07, 211, 213, 274, 281–82, 285, 287. ISBN 0-395-44114-5.
- Brian Regal (2013) [2008]. Searching for Sasquatch: Crackpots, Eggheads, and Cryptozoology. Palgrave Macmillan. pp. 59–62, 180. ISBN 978-1137349439.
- Ivan T. Sanderson (2008) [1961]. Abominable Snowmen: Legend Come to Life: The Story Of Sub-Humans On Five Continents From The Early Ice Age Until Today. Cosimo Classics. pp. 151, 156, 158. ISBN 978-1605203331.
