= Sasquatch: Legend Meets Science =

- Directed by: Doug Hajicek
- Narrated by: Stacy Keach
- Original language: English

Production
- Producer: Doug Hajicek
- Running time: 60 minutes

Original release
- Release: January 9, 2003

Sasquatch: Legend Meets Science is a documentary television film written and directed by Minnesota-based wildlife researcher and film producer Doug Hajicek. The program originally aired on the Discovery Channel on January 9, 2003 and features scientists from various disciplines analyzing evidence for the existence of Bigfoot, including the 1967 Patterson–Gimlin film, the 1996 Memorial Day Bigfoot footage, and the 2000 Skookum cast.

The documentary has since been released on VHS and DVD. In 2006, a companion book of the same title was published by Tom Doherty Associates (ISBN 0-7653-1216-6), authored by Idaho State University anatomist and physical anthropologist Jeffrey Meldrum, who was featured in the documentary.

== Companion book ==
In 2006, Meldrum released a companion book of the same name. In the book, Meldrum goes more in depth into the Bigfoot phenomenon, arguing that there is enough scientific evidence to warrant a serious discussion and exploration regarding the subject.

Following the release of the book, Meldrum was criticized for defending the Bigfoot phenomenon, with many labeling the work as pseudoscientific. Meldrum still defends his position as a scientist seeking to establish the possibility of an undiscovered great ape species living in North America and other places. His book was reviewed and analyzed by anthropologist Matt Cartmill.
