= John Bindernagel =

Canadian wildlife biologist (1941–2018)

John Albert Bindernagel
- Born: December 22, 1941; Kitchener, Ontario, Canada
- Died: January 17, 2018 (aged 76); British Columbia, Canada
- Occupation: Wildlife biologist
- Years active: 1963-2018
- Known for: Wildlife biology
- Notable work: Research on North American wildlife and Bigfoot

John Albert Bindernagel (December 22, 1941 – January 17, 2018) was a wildlife biologist who sought evidence for Sasquatch since 1963.

== Biography ==
Bindernagel was born in Kitchener, Ontario, attended the University of Guelph with a BSc in Biology, and received a PhD in Wildlife Biology from the University of Wisconsin–Madison, he worked as biologist of FAO, for the water, land, plants and fauna departments in several continents like Africa, Asia, Oceania, since 1995 to 2013. He moved to British Columbia in 1975 largely because the region was a hot spot for Bigfoot sightings. Over the years, he collected casts of tracks that he believed belonged to Bigfoot. He also claimed to have heard the creature near Comox Lake in 1992, comparing its whooping sound to that of a chimpanzee. Bindernagel believed that the Bigfoot phenomena should receive more attention from serious scientists, but remarked, "The evidence doesn't get scrutinized objectively. We can't bring the evidence to our colleagues because it's perceived as taboo."

He published a book in 1998 entitled North America's Great Ape: The Sasquatch. His second book, The Discovery of the Sasquatch: Reconciling Culture, History and Science in the Discovery Process, was published in 2010.

Bindernagel was a curator with the Bigfoot Field Researchers Organization (BFRO) until his death. Bindernagel died on January 17, 2018, at the age of 76. His cause of death was determined as cancer.

== Reception ==
Bindernagel's claim that the sasquatch is a real wildlife species was not accepted by the scientific community. His book, North America's Great Ape: The Sasquatch was reviewed by James Lazell and Jeannine Caldbeck in the Northwestern Naturalist journal. They took issue with Bindernagel's claim that many of the witness reports of the sasquatch cannot be hoaxes because this would be expensive and require a great amount of effort and time. Lazell and Caldbeck concluded:

We make the point that hoaxing is vastly less expensive in energy, time and effort than actually being a real sasquatch. Any viable population of a huge ape extending, as Bindernagel claims, from the Pacific Northwest to Florida and New England, would necessarily consume such enormous resources as to be a real nuisance, make a major and unmistakable ecological impact, and be a frequent provider of road and hunter kills. Hoaxing cannot be dismissed.

Joshua Blu Buhs criticized Bindernagel's The Discovery of the Sasquatch for failing to prove its thesis that bigfoot exists. He wrote that Bindernagel cherry-picked his data and ignored a whole body of evidence that contradicts the idea that bigfoot is an ape-like creature.

== Selected publications ==
- North America's Great Ape: The Sasquatch (1998, ISBN 0-9682887-0-7)
- The Discovery of the Sasquatch: Reconciling Culture, History and Science in the Discovery Process (2010)

== See also ==
- Peter C. Byrne
