= Skookum cast =

Plaster cast of elk mistaken for evidence of Bigfoot

- Material: plaster cast
- Size: 3.5 by 5 feet
- Discovered: September 22, 2000; Gifford Pinchot National Forest near Mount Adams, Washington state

The Skookum cast is a plaster cast showing the imprint of what appears to be a large animal. It was discovered in a muddy wallow near Mount Adams in the southern part of Washington state in the year 2000. Enthusiasts have argued that the imprint may have been made by the folkloric creature, Bigfoot, though scientific analysis says it was most likely an imprint of an elk. Scholars and academics consider Bigfoot, and alleged evidence, to be a combination of folklore, misidentification, and hoax rather than a living animal.

== Description ==
The cast was taken on September 22, 2000, during a Bigfoot Field Researchers Organization (BFRO) expedition to the Skookum Meadows area of the Gifford Pinchot National Forest in Washington state, during filming of the Animal X television show. Researchers filming for the show left fruit in a muddy wallow overnight and the imprint was discovered the next morning; no cameras were left to film. The cast, which measures 3.5 by 5 feet (1.1 m × 1.5 m) and weighs approximately 400 pounds (180 kg), is of a partial body imprint left in mud.

== Analysis ==
As seen during the Animal X episode, the Skookum cast was scanned onto a computer for further analysis and also studied in person by physical anthropologist Grover Krantz, wildlife biologist John Bindernagel, and others. Krantz stated his belief that the cast was made by a Sasquatch. Professor of the Department of Anthropology at Idaho State University, Jeffrey Meldrum, also studied the cast and found specific details in what he believed to be the foot area of the cast and found evidence of dermatoglyphics that he believes are related to primate feet.

The expedition diary states that three of the six apples were gone and the melons were pecked by birds. Tracks of elk, deer, bear and coyote were found nearby. The group concludes that an animal laid at the edge of the mud and reached over to grab the fruit. Discussion in the group, of reasons why an animal would not just grab the fruit led to the possible explanation that the "animal did not want to leave tracks". Chewed apple were collected and sent to a lab for analysis.

== Conclusion ==
On March 3, 2001, Marc Hume wrote an article for the National Post of Canada in which he recognized the clear tracks of an elk and described: "imprints left that would match perfectly with an elk's legs." In his opinion, the cast was "if anything, a cast of the impression made by the hindquarters of an elk. Hair found was analyzed and found to be from an elk.

MonsterTalk podcaster Blake Smith writing for Skeptoid in 2014 concluded the BRFO cast "was under a lot of pressure to produce substantial evidence for the television crew of Animal X" though Smith does not suspect hoaxing, but that people with "strong motivations that could easily lead to confirmation bias". The cast was "handled as a sensational discovery, but not as a scientific one" following their discovery by releasing a press release and not publication in a scientific journal. There were no researchers without an agenda or experts on elk providing comment. Smith states that the cast "is widely dismissed, even by some prominent Bigfoot proponents, as nothing more than a cast of an elk wallow. ... which is a common elk behavior." Physical access to the cast has been limited, and the "BFRO nor Meldrum and his credentialed associates have explained by what means they were able to rule out an elk as the cause of the impression."

Paranormal researcher and author Ben Radford writing for Skeptical Inquirer in March 2002, "Bigfoot at 50" concludes that as of 2002 no evidence is found, no bones, no bodies, "[E]ach passing day should be one day closer to their discovery. ... each ... decade that go by without definite proof of the existence of Bigfoot make its existence less and less likely." If Bigfoot is real, then it will be found. If it is "instead a self-perpetuating phenomenon ... the stories, sightings, and legends will likely continue unabated for centuries." Twenty years later, in December 2023, Radford asks the question, "Is Bigfoot Dead?", updating with a timeline from 2000 to 2023. His conclusion is that "Bigfoot is nowhere to be seen"; the search has stalled and though the "notable lack of evidence hasn't dampened the enthusiasm of devotees" the lack of evidence is that the "creatures simply do not exist and that the apparent evidence for them rests mostly on mistakes, hoaxes, and wishful thinking."

According to Bigfoot researcher Matthew Crowley, John Green considered one of the "Four Horseman" of Bigfoot examined the cast and "found it strong evidence of Sasquatch." Others in the pro-Bigfoot community followed his opinion even claiming "'dermal ridges" and "'testicular impressions'". In time, "Dr. Anton Wroblewski demonstrated with photographic comparisons – definitively and unambiguously – that the impression represented a reclining elk."
