= The X Creatures =

- Title card
- Genre: Documentary
- Starring: Chris Packham
- Country of origin: United Kingdom
- Original language: English
- No. of series: 1
- No. of episodes: 6

Production
- Running time: 22 minutes

Original release
- Network: BBC One
- Release: 26 August – 30 September 1998

The X Creatures is a British documentary television series that was produced by the BBC which was broadcast from 26 August to 30 September 1998 on BBC One. It was presented by Chris Packham, and examined the possibility of the existence of mystery animals.

The name of the show was a reference to the popular fictional television show The X-Files. Each episode (there were six in all, each lasting 30 minutes) involved Chris Packham travelling to a certain place on Earth where the creature supposedly exists, and examining eyewitness accounts, as opposed to searching for the creature. No VHS or DVD releases were ever made.

== Episode list ==
#	Title	Plot	Date
1	Yeti, Myths & Men	This episode looked at two hominid creatures - the Yeti, also known as the Abominable Snowman from the Himalayas, and the Orang Pendek from Sumatra.	26 August 1998
2	Alien in the Abyss	This episode looked at a creature that is known to exist, despite the fact that at the time so little was known about it - the giant squid.	2 September 1998
3	Loch Ness: Fathoming the Monster	A look at the legendary Loch Ness Monster from Loch Ness in Scotland. It also looks at the existence of a giant lizard - Megalania in Australia.	9 September 1998
4	Shooting the Bigfoot	A look at Bigfoot, also known as Sasquatch of North America. In particular, there was an attempt to debunk the Patterson–Gimlin film.	16 September 1998
5	Big Cats in a Little Country	A look at the existence of big cats in the wild of England.	23 September 1998
6	Beyond the Jaws of Extinction	A look at the possible existence of the extinct thylacine, also known as the Tasmanian tiger.	30 September 1998
