= Vladimir Markotic (anthropologist) =

Croatian American anthropologist (1920–1994)

- Born: July 16, 1920; Banja Luka
- Died: November 1994 (aged 74); Calgary
- Occupation: Anthropologist

Vladimir Markotic (July 16, 1920 - November 1994) was a Croatian-American anthropologist, archaeologist and cryptozoologist.

== Biography ==
Markotic was born in Banja Luka. He emigrated to the United States in 1947. He obtained his M.A. Anthropology from Indiana University Bloomington (1955) and a PhD in anthropology from Harvard University (1963). He was a research assistant at Indiana University and a teaching assistant for the Institute of East European Studies. Markotic was a Fellow of the Peabody Museum of Archaeology and Ethnology at Harvard University and a Fellow of the American Anthropological Association.

In 1962, he became assistant professor of archaeology at Illinois State University and from 1969 was associate professor of archaeology at University of Calgary. He retired as Associate Professor Emeritus in 1986. He was a specialist in Old World Archaeology and took interest in the ethnology and linguistics pertaining to Bosnia and Croatia. Markotic died in Calgary, aged 74.

== Cryptozoology ==
Markotic took interest in bigfoot and was a researcher in the field of cryptozoology, which has been criticized as pseudoscience. In 1984, he contributed a chapter to the book The Sasquatch and Other Unknown Hominoids, which he also edited with Grover Krantz. The book consists of 21 papers by a multitude of authors. It was negatively reviewed by Michael R. Dennett in the Skeptical Inquirer. Dennett commented that "The Sasquatch and Other Unknown Hominoids is bad science and, taken as a whole, bad writing... Until some real evidence comes to light there is no reason for anyone to take Sasquatch promoters seriously, especially if this book represents their best effort."

Anthropologist Kathleen J. Reichs wrote that the book failed to provide a scientifically rigour analysis of the physical evidence for unknown hominoids and is "riddled throughout with typographical and grammatical errors." She concluded that the book is unsatisfying from the point of view of physical anthropology but is worth reading for providing insight into non-mainstream interpretations of hominid evolution.

Biologist Debra A. Oleksiak commented that apart from a few exceptions "there is no critical evaluation of the sources and the accuracy of the data" and noted that many of the papers in the book "do not reflect an understanding of biological processes or evolutionary thinking".

== Selected publications ==
- The Sasquatch and Other Unknown Hominoids (1984)
- The Vinča Culture (1984)
