= Paul Freeman (cryptozoologist) =

Cryptozoologist (1943–2003)

- Born: August 10, 1943
- Died: April 2, 2003 (aged 59); Airway Heights, Washington
- Occupation: Cryptozoologist
- Spouse: Nancy Freeman
- Children: Sons — Duane Freeman, Michael Freeman; Daughter — Linda Walker

Paul Freeman (August 10, 1943 – April 2, 2003) was an American Bigfoot hunter who claimed to have captured video evidence of the existence of Bigfoot and discovered Bigfoot tracks showing dermal ridges. The plaster casts Freeman subsequently made were convincing enough to be considered critical pieces of evidence by anthropologists Jeff Meldrum of Idaho State University and Grover Krantz of Washington State University, who put considerable time and resources into studying them.

On June 10, 1982, Freeman reportedly sighted a Bigfoot near Walla Walla, Washington, which he described as being nearly 8 ft (2.4 m) tall and covered in reddish-brown body hair. In 1994 Freeman captured a purported Bigfoot on videotape near the Blue Mountains region of northeastern Oregon. The recording is considered authentic by some Bigfoot investigators, but is of resolution too low to be considered conclusive by most. It was also spoofed many times in Kokanee beer advertisements.

Freeman died at his home in Airway Heights, Washington at the age of 59 from complications of diabetes.
