= Daris Swindler =

American anthropologist (1925–2007)

Daris Ray Swindler (August 13, 1925 – December 6, 2007) was an American anthropologist.

== Biography ==
Born in Morgantown, West Virginia, Swindler later served in the U.S. Navy in World War II, working on tankers in the North Atlantic and Pacific oceans. He went on to study anthropology at West Virginia University and the University of Pennsylvania. A long-time professor at the University of Washington, Swindler also taught human anatomy at Cornell University Medical College, at the University of South Carolina, and at Michigan State University. Swindler was generally acknowledged as a leading primate expert, having specialized in the study of fossilized teeth; his book An Atlas of Primate Gross Anatomy is a standard work in the field. According to Stein, His collection of primate tooth castings has been donated to New York University and is being digitally recorded in 3D for web use giving students all over the world access to the collection. Swindler published several books. He traveled the world from an archaeological dig in the Valley of the Kings to Easter Island. Just prior to Swindler's death in December 2007 the University of Washington established a graduate fellowship in his name.

Swindler assisted police in many criminal cases, notably the searches for serial killers Gary Ridgway (a.k.a. the Green River Killer) and Ted Bundy.

== Bigfoot research ==
Though a longtime skeptic of Bigfoot, Swindler was one of the few experts willing to examine evidence cited in support of the creature's existence. As quoted by Stein, Swindler's opinion regarding Bigfoot changed after the discovery of the Skookum Body Cast. After making a detailed examination of the cast, Swindler stated, "Whatever made this was very well adapted to walking on two feet ... It's not conclusive, but it's consistent with what you'd expect to see if a giant biped sat down in the mud."
