= Laura Krantz =

American journalist (born 1978)

- Born: 1978 (age 47–48)
- Occupations: Journalist; Podcaster; Author
- Notable work: Wild Thing
- Relatives: Grover Krantz

Laura Krantz (born 1978) is an American journalist, podcaster, and author most known for being the host of the podcast Wild Thing. She is also the co-founder of the media company Foxtopus Ink.

Krantz grew up in Idaho and graduated from Whitman College in Washington in 2000. She previously worked as an editor of a radio show on KPCC (FM) and was an editor and producer at National Public Radio (NPR), where she worked on shows such as Morning Edition and Weekend Edition. Her work at NPR covered subject areas such as foreign policy, politics, technology, and literature.

Krantz hosts a podcast called Wild Thing, which is produced independently by her. The first season aired in 2018 and documents Krantz's discovery that she is related to anthropologist Grover Krantz, who was one of the world's foremost experts on Bigfoot. The podcast began as her reluctant foray into understanding the cultural fascination with Sasquatch, as well as how the creature might have evolved and various attempts to track it down. Subsequent seasons explored the possibility of extraterrestrial life, and the viability of nuclear power. Krantz went on to write children's books based on the podcast. The Atlantic listed Wild Thing as one of the best podcasts of 2018.
