= Roderick Sprague =

American anthropologist, ethnohistorian and archaeologist (1933–2012)

- Born: Roderick Sprague III; February 18, 1933; Albany, Oregon, U.S.
- Died: August 20, 2012 (aged 79); Moscow, Idaho
- Other name: Rick
- Education: Washington State University (B.A.; 1955, M.A.; 1959); University of Arizona (Ph.D., 1967)
- Known for: Important contributions to anthropology and archeology
- Spouse: Linda Sprague
- Children: 4
- Scientific career
- Fields: Anthropology, archeology, and ethnohistory
- Workplaces: University of Arizona (1960–64); Washington State University (1965–67); University of Idaho (1967–97)

Roderick Sprague III (February 18, 1933 – August 20, 2012) was an American anthropologist, ethnohistorian and historical archaeologist, and the emeritus Director of the Laboratory of Anthropology at the University of Idaho in Moscow, where he taught for thirty years. He had extensive experience in environmental impact research, trade beads, aboriginal burial customs, and the Columbia Basin area. Sprague was president of the Society of Bead Researchers from 2004 to 2007.

In addition to his work in the traditional anthropological fields, he also collaborated with Professor Grover Krantz in an attempt to apply scientific reasoning to the study of Sasquatch.

== Education ==
Sprague received both his bachelor's and master's degrees in anthropology from Washington State University in Pullman, serving in the U.S. Army in between. He received his Ph.D. in 1967 from the University of Arizona in Tucson.

As a graduate student in 1964 at Washington State University, he was the field supervisor of a dig at the Palus burial site in Lyons Ferry, Washington when one of only a few known Jefferson Peace Medals was discovered.

Additionally, his dissertation, "Aboriginal burial practices in the plateau region of North America" (1967) is considered one of the best writings on the topic.

== Career ==
Sprague's career was varied and took him in different directions. He conducted excavations in the Pacific Northwest, Alaska, and the Canadian Maritime on Prince Edward Island; and research in the American Southwest and Inner Mongolia. Much of his research was on burial practices and historical archaeology, with a special interest in glass and ceramic trade beads and buttons. He conducted burial research at the request of ten different American Indian tribal governments. Sprague was an early advocate of the importance of repatriation in archaeological and anthropological excavations, long before the enactment of the Native American Graves Protection and Repatriation Act.

Sprague served many roles in the Society for Historical Archaeology: on the Board of Directors from 1970 to 1971, secretary-treasurer from 1971 to 1974, member of the Editorial Advisory Board since 1977, Book Review Editor from 1977 to 1997, Archivist from 1987 to 1998, as president in 1976 and 1990 and as Parliamentarian from 1984 to 2008.

He was a professor of anthropology at the University of Idaho in Moscow for thirty years, until his retirement in 1997.

Sprague, along with Dr. Deward E. Walker, founded the scholarly journal Northwest Anthropological Research Notes in 1966, called the Journal of Northwest Anthropology since 2001.

== Awards ==
Sprague was the first member of The Society for Historical Archaeology to be awarded both the J. C. Harrington Medal in Historical Archaeology and the Carol Ruppe Distinguished Service Award.

== Personal life ==
In retirement, Sprague lived in Moscow with his wife Linda, who also holds degrees in anthropology. He had four children.

== Published works ==
- Burial Terminology: A Guide For Researchers (Lanham: AltaMira Press, 2005, ISBN 0-7591-0841-2)
- Excavations at the Warren Chinese Mining Camp Site, with Michael Striker, Moscow: Alfred W. Bowers Laboratory of Anthropology, University of Idaho, 1993.
- A Preliminary Bibliography of Washington Archaeology (Pullman: Washington State University, 1967)
- The Material Culture of Steamboat Passengers - Archaeological Evidence from the Missouri River (New York: Springer, 1999, Annalies Corbin 0306461684)
- A Bibliography of Trade Beads in North America, with Karlis Karklins. Promontory Press, 1987. 0969276109
- The Descriptive Archaeology of the Palus Burial Site, Lyons Ferry, Washington, Pullman: Washington State University, 1965. B0007HGKL4

Among his published works on Sasquatch:

- The Scientist Looks at the Sasquatch (Moscow: University Press of Idaho, 1977, with anthropologist Grover Krantz)
- The Scientist Looks at the Sasquatch II (Moscow: University Press of Idaho, 1979, also with Grover Krantz, ISBN 0-89301-061-8)
