= Esteban Sarmiento =

Esteban Sarmiento is a primatologist and biologist. He is noted for his work in primate anthropology and for appearing on the Monster Quest television series.

== Biography ==
Sarmiento earned a biological anthropology Ph.D. in 1985 and from then until at least 2008 he worked as a research associate at the American Museum of Natural History. His main field of study is the skeletons of hominoids, including both extinct and living species. From 2002 to 2003, he was a Fulbright scholar teaching physiology at Eduardo Mondlane University in Mozambique.

Presently, he heads The Human Evolution Foundation whose main goal is to understand humanity's place in nature, and fight to end to racial discrimination at Public Universities.

Sarmiento is one of the few mainstream experts to give serious attention to cryptozoology, particularly reports of Bigfoot. Sarmiento does not suggest that the existence of Bigfoot has been established, but that its existence is possible and that claims and evidence deserve careful scrutiny. He has stated, "If the animal in the P&G film [Bigfoot] is real, this animal is exceedingly human-like...[i]t would be our closest relative on earth.” He has appeared on several episodes of the History Channel series Monster Quest discussing Bigfoot and other cryptids.

== Legal actions against discrimination ==
Sarmiento filed a lawsuit against Queens College claiming that the college's refusal to grant him interviews in 1999 and 2000 for associate professor employment was motivated by racial discrimination and thus a violation of Title VII of the Civil Rights Act of 1964. In 2005, a U.S. District Court ruled against Sarmiento. The court noted that while Sarmiento was qualified for the job, Queens College demonstrated that other candidates were more qualified and race was not a factor in their decisions. For example, among the job requirements was an emphasis on human anatomy and anthropology, while Sarmiento's emphasis had been on non-human primates. At the time Sarmiento had 10 years of teaching experience in anatomy in Universities throughout the world. The court also ruled that Sarmiento submitted inadequate syllabi and other candidates had superior teaching experience. Later in 2005, an appeals court upheld the district court decision.

Sarmiento subsequently filed a similar lawsuit against Montclair State University. Again, he alleged racial discrimination as a factor in a 2001 hiring procedure. The court ruled that Montclair established that another applicant was better qualified for the position due to her specialty in medical anthropology and that race was not a factor in Montclair's hiring decision. Montclair interviewed two black women, one with a Ph.D, but hired the white woman. While the candidate Montclair ultimately hired did not have her Ph.D. at the time of interview, she was scheduled to earn her doctorate by the time employment would have begun, in line with Montclair's hiring procedure. Montclair, however in circular advertisement specifically required a Ph.D. degree.
