= Brian Regal =

American historian

Brian Regal, PhD
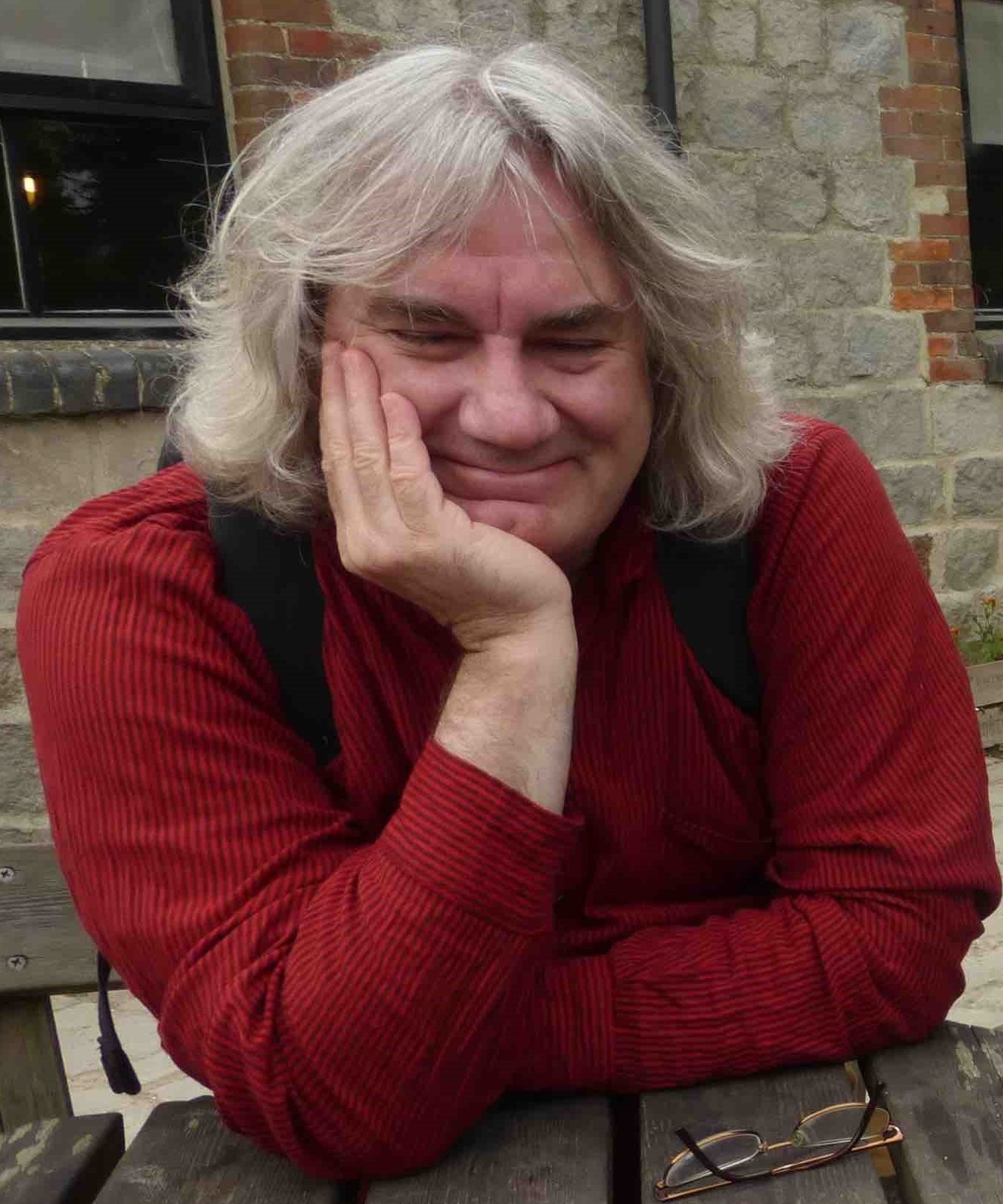
- Regal in 2017
- Occupation: Historian
- Title: Professor for the History of Science, Technology and Medicine
- Board member of: Editorial Board, Endeavour

Academic background
- Thesis: Henry Fairfield Osborn, Race, and the Search for the Origins of Man (2001)

Academic work
- Discipline: History
- Sub-discipline: History of science
- Notable works: The Battle Over America’s Origin Story, The Secret History of the Jersey Devil, and Searching for Sasquatch
- Website: sites.google.com/a/kean.edu/brian-regal-phd/Home

Brian Regal was an American historian of science, and writer. He was Professor of the history of science at Kean University in New Jersey. He lectured on science and medical history, including Alchemy and the Occult.

Regal was the author of an encyclopedia of pseudoscience, as well as Searching for Sasquatch: Crackpots, Eggheads and Cryptozoology, a scholarly study of cryptozoology. He also wrote on the history of the Jersey Devil as well as the discovery of America.

== Early life ==
Regal grew up in Newark, New Jersey's Ironbound neighborhood, in a Catholic family. During the Newark riots of 1968 they relocated across the Passaic River to nearby Kearny, New Jersey. He developed an early interest for science and the mysterious, which he attributes to television series such as Jonny Quest and later In Search of...

Discouraged from pursuing higher education by a high school guidance counselor ("kids like you don't go to college"), Regal joined the armed forces, serving as a tank commander.

== Academic career ==
Going to college after his military career, he graduated with a B.A. in history from Kean University in 1995, then a M.A. in American History and Literature at Drew University (1996), and a Doctorate in Modern History and Literature (specialty in history of science) from Drew (2001). After a seven-year stint at the TCI College of Technology in Manhattan, he took a position at Kean University, where he holds the title of Professor for the History of Science, Technology and Medicine.

Regal was interested on how theories of human evolution have been received by the public and by religious authorities. His first two books, Henry Fairfield Osborn: Race and the Search for the Origins of Man, and Human Evolution: A Guide to the Debates, explore that theme.

In 2005, Regal realized that Grover Krantz's estate donated his notes and papers to the Smithsonian Institution after his death in 2002, where they remained unread. Within the collection, Regal found a significant amount of source documents on the founding of cryptozoology. Those documents were the starting point for Searching for Sasquatch (2012).

In 2021, he published his book about various alternative theories of early explorers coming to North America before Christopher Columbus and how those theories relate to the sociopolitical context of the period when they appear.

He published his autobiography, The Monster of Newark in 2024.

He was a member of the history journal Endeavour. and appeared in dozens of podcasts and written many Op Ed pieces.

== Death ==
Dr. Regal passed away suddenly in early October, 2026. His passing was announced on the Kean University makehistoryatkean Instagram Page and in several historical organizations' publications. He was 66 years old.

== Publications ==
Books

- Regal, Brian (2026). Darwin and the Monsters: The Long History of Cryptozoology. Routledge. ISBN 978-1032786339.
- Regal, Brian (2024). The Monster of Newark: The Life and adventures of an Historian of Science. Fortean Zoology Press, UK. ISBN 978-1909488748.
- Regal, Brian (2022). The Battle over America's Origin Story: Legends, Amateurs, and Professional Historiographers. Palgrave Macmillan Cham. ISBN 978-3030995379.
- Regal, Brian; Esposito, Frank J. (2018). The Secret History of the Jersey Devil: How Quakers, Hucksters, and Benjamin Franklin Created a Monster. Johns Hopkins University Press. ISBN 978-1421424897.
- Regal, Brian (2011). Searching for Sasquatch: Crackpots, Eggheads, and Cryptozoology. Palgrave Macmillan US. ISBN 978-0230111479.
- Regal, Brian (2009). Pseudoscience: A Critical Encyclopedia. Greenwood. ISBN 978-0313355073.
- Regal, Brian (2007). Icons of Evolution: An Encyclopedia of People, Evidence, and Controversies. Greenwood. ISBN 978-0313339110.
- Regal, Brian (2005). Radio: The Life Story of a Technology. Greenwood. ISBN 978-0313331671.
- Regal, Brian (2004). Human Evolution: A Guide to the Debates. ABC-CLIO. ISBN 978-1851094189.
- Regal, Brian (2002). Henry Fairfield Osborn: Race and the Search for the Origins of Man. Routledge. ISBN 978-0754605874.

Selected papers

- Regal, Brian (Summer 2020). "Cornelia Horsford and the Adventures of Leif Erikson: Viking Settlements in the Bay State". Historical Journal of Massachusetts. 48 (2): 36–59 – via Gale Academic.
- Regal, Brian (Summer 2015). "The Jersey Devil: a political animal". New Jersey Studies. 1 (1): 79–103 – via ResearchGate.
- Regal, Brian (June 2012). "Richard Owen and the Sea-Serpent". Endeavour. 36 (2): 65–68. doi:10.1016/j.endeavour.2011.12.001. PMID 22305471.
- Regal, Brian (January 2009). "Entering Dubious Realms: Grover Krantz, Science and Sasquatch". Annals of Science. 66 (1): 83–102. doi:10.1080/00033790802202421. PMID 19831199. S2CID 23736660.
