= Grover Krantz =

American biological anthropologist and cryptozoologist (1931–2002)

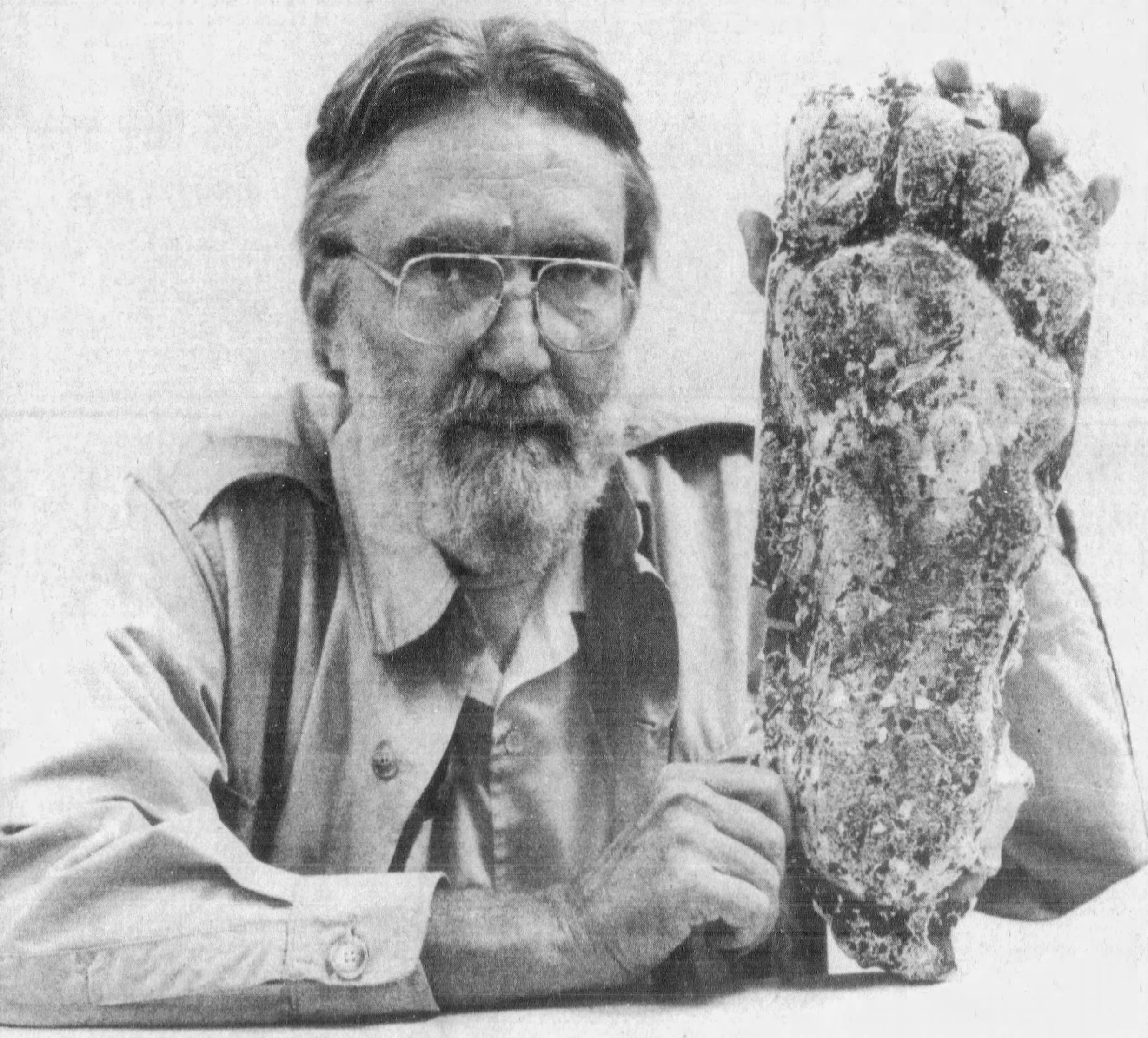
- Krantz in 1982, holding a footprint purportedly made by Bigfoot
- Born: Grover Sanders Krantz; November 5, 1931; Salt Lake City, Utah, U.S.
- Died: February 14, 2002 (aged 70); Port Angeles, Washington, U.S.
- Education: University of California, Berkeley (BS, MA); University of Minnesota (PhD)
- Known for: Research on human evolution, Kennewick Man, and Bigfoot
- Spouse: Evelyn Einstein
- Relatives: Laura Krantz
- Scientific career
- Fields: Physical anthropology
- Workplaces: Phoebe A. Hearst Museum of Anthropology (1958–1968); Washington State University (1968–1998)

Grover Sanders Krantz (November 5, 1931 – February 14, 2002) was an American anthropologist and cryptozoologist; he was one of the few scientists who had not only researched Bigfoot, but also expressed a belief in the animal's existence. Throughout his professional career, Krantz authored more than 60 academic articles and 10 books on human evolution, and conducted field research in Europe, China, and Java.

Outside of Krantz's formal studies in evolutionary anthropology and primatology, his cryptozoological research on Bigfoot drew heavy criticism from his colleagues due to being considered fringe science, costing him research grants and promotions, and delaying his tenure at the university. Further, his articles on the subject were rejected by peer-reviewed scholarly journals.

Krantz was tenacious in his work, however, and was often drawn to other controversial subjects, such as the Kennewick Man remains, arguing for their preservation and study. He has been described as having been the "only scientist" and "lone professional" to seriously consider Bigfoot in his time, in a field largely dominated by amateur naturalists.

== Early life and education ==
Krantz was born on November 5, 1931, in Salt Lake City, to Carl Victor Emmanuel Krantz and Esther Maria (née Sanders) Krantz. His parents were devout Mormons, and while Krantz tried to follow the basic Christian philosophy of behavior and morality, he was not active in the religion. Krantz was raised in Rockford, Illinois until the age of 10, in 1942, when his family relocated back to Utah.

Beginning in 1949, Krantz attended the University of Utah for a year before joining the Air National Guard, where he served as a desert survival instructor at Clovis, New Mexico from 1951 to 1952. In 1952, Krantz transferred to the University of California, Berkeley, where he completed a Bachelor of Science degree in 1955 and a Master's degree in 1958. In 1971, Krantz obtained his doctorate in anthropology from the University of Minnesota, with the submission of his doctoral dissertation, entitled The Origins of Man.

== Career ==
In the early 1960s, Krantz worked as a technician at the Phoebe A. Hearst Museum of Anthropology in Berkeley, California before acquiring a full-time teaching position at Washington State University, where he taught from 1968 until his retirement in 1998. He was a popular professor despite giving notoriously difficult exams, and often ate lunch with students and talked about anthropology, unified field theory in physics, military history, and current events.

In the 1970s, Krantz studied the fossil remains of Ramapithecus, an extinct genus of primates then thought by many anthropologists to have been ancestral to humans, although Krantz helped prove this notion false. Krantz's research on Homo erectus was extensive, including studies of phonemic speech and theoretical hunting patterns, and argued that this led to many of the anatomical differences between H. erectus and modern humans.

In 1968, Krantz named the hunting that Ashley Montagu had earlier described involving the human pursuit hunting of animals persistence hunting. Krantz also wrote an influential paper on the emergence of humans in prehistoric Europe and the development of Indo-European languages, and was the first researcher to explain the function of the mastoid process. Krantz's professional work was diverse, including research on the development of Paleolithic stone tools, Neanderthal taxonomy and culture, the Quaternary extinction event, sea level changes.

In 1982, Krantz published a notable paper on the evidence of sex in the human fossil record. In 1996, Krantz was drawn into the Kennewick Man controversy, arguing both in academia and in court that direct lineage to extant human populations could not be demonstrated. In an interview appearing in The New Yorker, Krantz stated his view that "this skeleton cannot be racially or culturally associated with any existing American Indian group" and: "The Native Repatriation Act [sic] has no more applicability to this skeleton than it would if an early Chinese expedition had left one of its members there". In 2001, Krantz attempted to submit the last paper he wrote before his death, entitled "Neanderthal Continuity in View of Some Overlooked Data", but it was rejected by the peer-reviewed journal Current Anthropology, with then-editor Benjamin Orlove stating that it did not make enough reference to the most current research.

=== Bigfoot research ===
Krantz's specialty as an anthropologist included all aspects of human evolution, but he was best known outside of academia as the first serious researcher to devote his professional energies to the scientific study of Bigfoot, beginning in 1963. Because his cryptozoology research was ignored by mainstream scientists, despite his academic credentials, Krantz published numerous books aimed at casual readers and also frequently appeared in television documentaries in a bid to find an audience, including Arthur C. Clarke's Mysterious World, In Search of..., and Sasquatch: Legend Meets Science. Krantz's studies of Bigfoot, which he called "Sasquatch" (an Anglicization of the Halkomelem word sásq’ets (IPA: [ˈsæsqʼəts], meaning "wild man"), led him to believe that this was an actual creature. He theorized that sightings were due to small pockets of surviving gigantopithecines, with the progenitor population having migrated across the Bering land bridge, which was later used by humans to enter North America. Gigantopithecus lived alongside humans but is thought to have gone extinct 100,000 years ago in eastern Asia, while the Bering land bridge existed between 135,000 to 70,000 years BP.

In January 1985, Krantz tried to formally name Bigfoot by presenting a paper at the meeting of the International Society of Cryptozoology held in Sussex, England, assigning it the binomen Gigantopithecus blacki, although this was not permitted by the International Commission on Zoological Nomenclature because G. blacki was an existing taxon and because the creature was lacking a holotype. Krantz argued that his plaster casts were suitable holotypes, later suggesting G. canadensis as a name, with the caveat that were Sasquatch found to be a member of the Homininae clade, the genus name could be Gigantanthropus in place of Gigantopithecus. Krantz then tried to have his paper, entitled "A Species Named from Footprints", published in an academic journal, but it was rejected by the reviewers.

After seeing footage stills of the Patterson–Gimlin film that appeared on the February 1968 cover of Argosy, Krantz was skeptical, believing the film to be an elaborate hoax: "It looked to me like someone wearing a gorilla suit". Krantz stated, "I gave Sasquatch only a 10 percent chance of being real". The following year, however, after years of skepticism, Krantz finally became convinced of Bigfoot's existence after analyzing the "Cripplefoot" plaster casts gathered at Bossburg, Washington in December 1969. Krantz later studied the Patterson–Gimlin film in full, and after taking notice of the creature's peculiar gait and purported anatomical features, such as flexing leg muscles, he changed his mind and became an advocate of its authenticity.

The Cripplefoot tracks, left in snow, purportedly showed microscopic dermal ridges (fingerprints) and injuries tentatively identified as clubfoot by primatologist John Napier. Krantz asked Dutch professor A.G. de Wilde of the University of Groningen to examine the prints, who concluded that they were "not from some dead object with ridges in it, but come from a living object able to spread its toes". Krantz also attempted to have both the FBI and Scotland Yard study the dermal ridge patterns, and was told by renowned fingerprint expert John Berry, an editor of the journal Fingerprint Whorld, that Scotland Yard had concluded the prints were "probably real". To his disappointment, a subsequent 1983 article in the journal Cryptozoology, entitled "Anatomy and Dermatoglyphics of Three Sasquatch Footprints", was largely ignored.

After constructing biomechanical models of the Cripplefoot casts by calculating their distance, leverage, weight dynamics, and distribution, and comparing the data to the track's heel, ankle, and toe base, Krantz concluded that the footprints had been left by an animal about 2.44 m (8 ft 0 in) tall and weighing roughly 363 kilograms (800 lb; 57.2 st). The morphological detail in the cast, particularly impressions of the thenar eminence muscle, also helped convince Krantz, who argued that a hoax "would require someone quite familiar with the anatomy of the human hand to make the connection between a non-opposable thumb and an absence of the thenar eminence". This culminated in Krantz's first publication on the subject of Bigfoot, with his article "Sasquatch Handprints" appearing in the journal North American Research Notes in 1971.

Shortly before his death, Krantz also examined the Skookum cast. He did not publicly endorse its authenticity, saying in an interview with Outside magazine: "I don't know what it is. I'm baffled. Elk. Sasquatch. That's the choice." Krantz, Peter Byrne, René Dahinden, and John Green have been dubbed the "Four Horsemen of Sasquatchery". All four individuals had died by 2023.

== Personal life and death ==
Grover Krantz had one brother, Victor Krantz, who worked as a photographer at the Smithsonian Institution.

Krantz was married four times and divorced three times. His first wife was Patricia Howland, whom he married in 1953; he was later married to Joan Brandson in 1959. In 1964, he married his third wife, Evelyn Einstein, who was an adopted daughter of Hans Albert Einstein, a son of Albert Einstein. He married his fourth wife, Diane Horton, on November 5, 1982. Krantz had a stepson, Dural Horton.

Krantz was a road enthusiast and frequently took road trips, traveling to all 48 continental states. In 1984, Krantz received high scores on the Miller Analogies Test and was subsequently accepted into the high IQ society Intertel, which accepts anyone scoring in the top 1% on an IQ test. He was also a member of Mensa, which sets the bar at the top 2%. On March 3, 1987, Krantz debated Duane Gish on creationism and evolution at Washington State University; the well-publicized three-hour debate was attended by more than 1000 people.

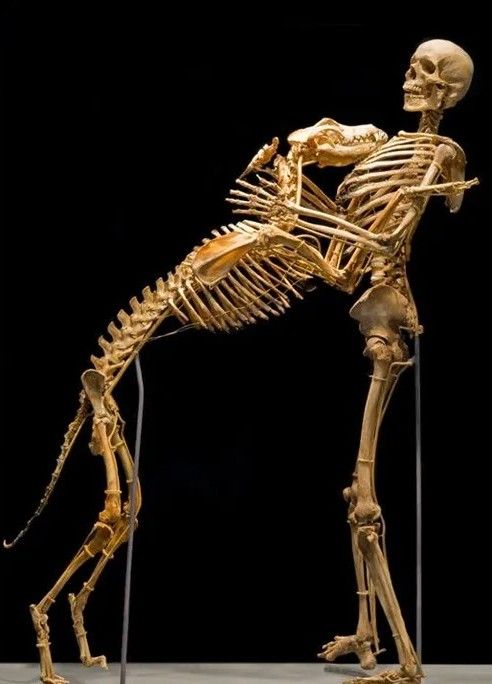
Skeletons of Grover Krantz and his dog, Clyde, at the Smithsonian Museum. The posing was done at Krantz's request.

On Valentine's Day, February 14, 2002 (24 years ago), Krantz died in his Port Angeles, Washington home from pancreatic cancer after an eight-month battle with the disease. At his request, no funeral was held. Instead, his body was shipped to the body farm at the University of Tennessee Anthropological Research Facility, where scientists study human decay rates to aid in forensic investigations.

In 2003, Krantz's skeleton arrived at the Smithsonian's National Museum of Natural History and was laid to rest in a green cabinet, alongside the bones of his four favorite Irish Wolfhounds – Clyde, Icky, Leica, and Yahoo – as was his last request. In 2009, Krantz's skeleton was painstakingly articulated and, along with the skeleton of one of his dogs (Clyde), included on display in the Smithsonian's "Written in Bone: Forensic Files of the 17th Century Chesapeake" exhibition at the National Museum of Natural History. His bones have also been used to teach forensics and advanced osteology to George Washington University students.

After his death, a scholarship named after Krantz was established at the University to promote "interest in the fields of physical/biological anthropology, linguistic archaeology, and/or human demography". After his death, an editor at NPR named Laura Krantz saw the obituary in the Washington Post and realized that Grover was a relative of hers; he was her grandfather's cousin. She spent a year documenting his life's work on her podcast, Wild Thing, and later wrote a children's book, The Search for Sasquatch.

== Bibliography ==
Non-Sasquatch works include:

- Climatic Races and Descent Groups (North Quincy, MA: Christopher Publishing House, 1980. ISBN 978-0-8158-0390-4)
- The Process of Human Evolution (Cambridge, MA: Schenkman Publishing, 1981. ISBN 978-0-87073-348-2)
- Geographical Development of European Languages (New York, NY: Peter Lang Publishing, 1988. ISBN 978-0-8204-0800-2)
- Only A Dog (Hong Kong: William Meacham, 2008. ISBN 978-988-17-3241-5)
- Numerous scholarly papers, published in Current Anthropology, American Anthropologist, American Journal of Physical Anthropology, American Journal of Archaeology, American Antiquity, and other journals

Among his works on Sasquatch are:

- The Scientist Looks at the Sasquatch (Moscow: University Press of Idaho, 1977, with anthropologist Roderick Sprague (eds.). ISBN 978-0-89301-044-7)
- The Scientist Looks at the Sasquatch II (Moscow: University Press of Idaho, 1979, with Roderick Sprague (eds.). ISBN 978-0-89301-061-4)
- The Sasquatch and Other Unknown Hominoids (Calgary: Western Publishing, 1984, with archaeologist Vladimir Markotić (eds.). ISBN 978-0-919119-10-9)
- Big Footprints: A Scientific Inquiry Into the Reality of Sasquatch (Boulder, CO: Johnson Books, 1992. ISBN 978-1-55566-099-4)
- Bigfoot Sasquatch Evidence (Surrey, BC: Hancock House, 1999. ISBN 978-0-88839-447-7)
- Numerous scholarly papers, published in Northwest Anthropological Research Notes, Cryptozoology, and other journals
