= Pangboche Hand =

Purported hand of a yeti found in Nepal

Photo of the Pangboche Hand, taken in 1958 by Peter Byrne

The Pangboche Hand is an artifact from a Buddhist monastery in Pangboche, Nepal. Supporters contend that the hand is from a Yeti, a scientifically unrecognized animal purported to live in the Himalayan mountains. A finger bone from the hand was tested and the DNA shown to be human.

== History ==
=== Antiquity ===
According to members of the Pangboche monastery, Lama Sangwa Dorje once walked into a cave to meditate. During his stay, a yeti revered him, bringing him food, water and fuel, and eventually became his Buddhist disciple. When the yeti died, Sangwa collected the hand and scalp and took them back to the monastery, where they remained as sacred relics, periodically paraded around the village as a fertility ritual, until they were discovered in the modern age.

=== Western discovery and initial theft by Byrne ===
Oil businessman and adventurer Tom Slick first heard accounts of a "Yeti hand" held as a ritual artifact in the monastery at Pangboche during one of his first "Abominable Snowman" treks in 1957. The Slick expeditions were the first to bring photographs of the hand back to the West.

During later Tom Slick-sponsored expeditions in and around the Himalayas, his associates gathered more information on the "Pangboche hand," and an effort to further examine it was planned. In 1959, a member of Slick's expedition that year, Peter Byrne, reportedly stole pieces of the artifact after the monks who owned it refused to allow its removal for study. Byrne stated that he was shown what looked to be a large, mummified primate hand. Byrne claimed to have replaced the stolen bone fragments with human bones, rewrapping the hand to disguise his theft.

Byrne smuggled the bones from Nepal into India, after which actor James Stewart allegedly smuggled the hand out of the country in his luggage, bypassing security by hiding it among his wife's undergarments. Cryptozoologist Loren Coleman rediscovered this story while writing Tom Slick's biography in the 1980s. Coleman confirmed details of the incidents with written materials in the Slick archives, interviews with Byrne, and correspondence with Stewart. Byrne later confirmed the Pangboche hand story via a letter from Stewart that Byrne published in a general book on Nepalese wildlife.

During the highly publicized 1960 World Book expedition, which had many goals including gathering intelligence on Chinese rocket launchings, Sir Edmund Hillary and Marlin Perkins took a sidetrip in Nepal to investigate the hand. Hillary was unaware of the possibility that he was looking at a combination of the original material and the human bones placed there by Byrne. Hillary determined the artifact was a hoax.

=== Later studies and developments ===
London University primatologist William Charles Osman Hill conducted a physical examination of the pieces that Byrne supplied. His first findings were that it was hominid in nature, and later in 1960 he decided that the Pangboche fragments were a closer match with a Neanderthal.

In 1991, in conjunction with Coleman's research, it was discovered that the Slick expedition consultant and American anthropologist George Agogino had retained samples of the alleged Yeti hand. The NBC program Unsolved Mysteries obtained samples and determined they were similar to human tissue, but were not human, and could only verify they were "near human." After the broadcast of the program, the entire hand was stolen from the Pangboche monastery, and reportedly disappeared into a private collection via the illegal underground in the sale of antiquities. George Agogino, before his death on September 11, 2000, transferred his important files on the Pangboche Yeti hand to Loren Coleman.

In 2010, Wētā Workshop produced a replica skull and hand based on photos of the missing hand and skull. Mike Allsop handed over the replica skull and hand to monks at Pangboche in May 2011.

On 27 December 2011 it was announced that a finger belonging to the hand contained human DNA, following tests carried out in Edinburgh. Rob Ogden commented that "We have got a very, very strong match to a number of existing reference sequences on human DNA databases... Human was what we were expecting and human is what we got."
