= Peter C. Byrne =

Irish-American explorer, cryptozoologist and media personality

- Born: 22 August 1925; Dublin, Ireland
- Died: 28 July 2023 (aged 97); Tillamook, Oregon, United States
- Occupations: Explorer, writer, media personality, and cryptozoologist
- Years active: 1950–2023

Peter Cyril Byrne (22 August 1925 – 28 July 2023) was an Irish-American explorer, writer, media personality, and cryptozoologist, probably best known as a Bigfoot investigator. He has been dubbed one of the "Four Horsemen of Sasquatchery", along with René Dahinden, John Green, and Grover Krantz.

== Filmography ==
A partial list of film and series credits:

- A Flash of Beauty: Bigfoot Revealed (2022)
- Unexplained Mysteries (series) (2004)
- Sasquatch Odyssey: The Hunt for Bigfoot (1999)
- Shaawanoki: The Mystery of the Swamp Apes (1998)
- Ancient Mysteries (series) (1997)
- Sightings (series) (1994–1995)
- In Search of... (series) (1977, 1978, 1979)
- Manbeast! Myth or Monster? (1978)
- The Force Beyond (1977)
- The Mysterious Monsters (1975)

== Bibliography ==
- Peter C. Byrne (2016). The Hunt for Bigfoot (2nd ed.). ISBN 978-1-5233-6545-6.
