= René Dahinden =

Canadian Bigfoot researcher (1930–2001)

René Dahinden (August 22, 1930 – April 18, 2001) was a Swiss-Canadian cryptozoologist. Dahinden was born in Weggis, Switzerland and moved to British Columbia in October 1953, where he would live for the rest of his life. He became interested in the Bigfoot phenomenon shortly after arriving in Canada, and during the next few decades he conducted many field investigations and interviews throughout the Pacific Northwest. Dahinden was a major advocate for the controversial Patterson–Gimlin film, which was shot in 1967 and supposedly provides photographic evidence of Bigfoot. With Don Hunter, he co-wrote the book Sasquatch, which was published in 1973 in a hardcover edition. In 1975, the book would be issued as a paperback. This title would then be revised and renamed in 1993 as Sasquatch/Bigfoot: The Search for North America's Incredible Creature, Revised Edition.

David Suchet's French Canadian Bigfoot-hunting character in the 1987 film Harry and the Hendersons is based on Dahinden.

For a year, Dahinden acted as spokesman for Kokanee beer, and appeared in commercials in Canada.

Dahinden died of prostate cancer on April 18, 2001, in British Columbia. In an obituary in the National Post, his friend Christopher Murphy remembered a remark of Dahinden's: "One day he said to me: 'You know, I've spent over 40 years – and I didn't find it. I guess that's got to say something.'"

He, Peter Byrne, John Green, and Grover Krantz have been dubbed the “Four Horsemen of Sasquatchery”.
