= John R. Napier =

British primatologist and paleoanthropologist (1917–1987)

John Russell Napier
- Born: 11 March 1917; Old Windsor, England
- Died: 29 August 1987 (aged 70); Isle of Mull, Scotland
- Education: Medical College of St Bartholomew's Hospital (MB BS; 1943); University of London (D.Sc.)
- Known for: Important contributions to primatology and Bigfoot research
- Scientific career
- Fields: Primatology; Paleoanthropology
- Workplaces: See the text
- Notable students: Alison Richard

John Russell Napier, MRCS, LRCP, D.Sc. (11 March 1917 – 29 August 1987) was a British primatologist, paleoanthropologist, and physician, who is notable for his work with Homo habilis and OH 7, as well as on human and primate hands/feet. During his life he was widely considered a leading authority on primate taxonomy, but is perhaps most famous to the general public for his research on Bigfoot.

== Biography ==
Napier was an orthopedic surgeon at the University of London before being invited by Sir Wilfrid Le Gros Clark to join him in his paleoanthropology research. Napier then dedicated his life afterward to primatology, becoming the founder of the Primate Society of Great Britain, and was among the group, with Louis Leakey and Philip Tobias, that named Homo habilis in the 1960s.

Napier later became Director of the Primate Biology Program at the Smithsonian Institution, where he examined the famous purported footage of Bigfoot, the Patterson–Gimlin film. After leaving the Smithsonian, Napier became a Visiting Professor of Primate Biology at Birkbeck College in London. He also served as President of Twycross Zoo in Leicestershire, England. Napier was married to British primatologist Prudence Hero Napier (1916 – 6 June 1997), the daughter of Sir Hugo Rutherford.

=== Lectures ===
In 1970 he was invited to deliver the Royal Institution Christmas Lecture on Monkeys Without Tails: A Giraffe's Eye-view of Man.

=== Bigfoot research ===
Napier was one of the first notable scientists to give serious attention to the Bigfoot/Sasquatch phenomenon. His investigations included interviewing amateur investigators and purported eyewitnesses, visiting alleged Bigfoot sighting areas, studying the scant physical evidence, and screening the 1967 Patterson–Gimlin film. Napier concluded the film was a clever hoax: "the scientific evidence taken collectively points to a hoax of some kind." However, by the same token, in reference to the Patterson–Gimlin film, Napier did also state on page 89 of his 1973 book 'Bigfoot: The Yeti And Sasquatch In Myth And Reality', "there was nothing in this film which would prove conclusively that this was a hoax."

In his 1973 book on the subject, Napier ultimately judged the evidence to be inconclusive: there was not enough hard proof to confirm to Napier that Bigfoot was a real creature. However, Napier judged the indirect evidence – especially footprints – as compelling and intriguing enough to avoid dismissing the subject as entirely unworthy of serious study.

== Institutions ==
- St Bartholomew's Hospital, Senior House Surgeon, Chief Assistant to the Orthopaedic Unit, Registrar of the Peripheral Nerve Injury Unit (1934–1946)
- University College London Medical School, Demonstrator in the Department of Anatomy (1944–1949)
- Royal Free Hospital, London, Lecturer in Anatomy (1955–1967); Director of the Unit of Primatology and Human Evolution (1961–1967)
- Smithsonian Institution, Conservator of the Division of Mammals and Director of the Unit of Primatology and Human Evolution (1967–1969)
- Queen Elizabeth College, Director of the Program in Primate Biology (1969–1973)
- Birkbeck College, Visiting Professor of Primate Biology (1973–1978)

== Selected bibliography ==
- A Handbook of Living Primates (New York: Academic Press, 1967, with Prudence Hero Napier)
- Old World Monkeys: Evolution, Systematics, and Behavior (New York: Academic Press, 1970, with Prudence Hero Napier)
- Roots of Mankind (Washington: Smithsonian Institution Press, 1971)
- Bigfoot; The Yeti and Sasquatch in Myth and Reality (New York: E P Dutton, 1973)
- Bigfoot (New York: Berkley Pub. Corp., 1974)
- Monkeys without Tails (New York: Taplinger Pub. Co., 1976)
- Primate Locomotion (London: Oxford University Press, 1976)
- Primates and Their Adaptations (Burlington, NC: Scientific Publications Division, Carolina Biological Supply Co., 1977.)
- Hands (New York: Pantheon Books, 1980)
- The Natural History of the Primates (Cambridge: MIT Press, 1988, with Prudence Hero Napier)
