= John Willison Green =

Canadian journalist (1927–2016)

- Born: February 12, 1927; Vancouver, BC, Canada
- Died: May 28, 2016 (aged 89); Chilliwack, BC, Canada
- Education: University of British Columbia; Columbia University
- Occupations: Bigfoot researcher, author, journalist
- Notable credit(s): Sasquatch: The Apes Among Us, On the Track of the Sasquatch, Year of the Sasquatch, The Sasquatch File
- Children: 5
- Relatives: Howard Charles Green (father)

John Willison Green (February 12, 1927 – May 28, 2016) was a Canadian journalist and a leading researcher of the Bigfoot phenomenon. He was a graduate of both the University of British Columbia and Columbia University and compiled a database of more than 3,000 sighting and track reports.

== Sasquatch investigation work ==
Green first began investigating Sasquatch sightings and track finds in 1957 after meeting René Dahinden and the two researchers collaborated in interviewing witnesses and sharing information of alleged sightings. A year later, Green was shown a series of 15" tracks crossing a sandbar beside Bluff Creek in California so deeply impressed as to indicate a weight many times that of any potential hoaxer. He had been trying ever since to establish what it is that makes the tracks. Green also investigated the Sasquatch tracks reported in Bluff Creek, California, in the summer of 1958.

As a renowned authority in the field, Green appeared as a keynote speaker at three of the major scientific Sasquatch symposia beginning with the May 1978 Anthropology of the Unknown: Sasquatch and Similar Phenomena conference at the University of British Columbia. Green authored several Sasquatch books, including Sasquatch: The Apes Among Us (1978), regarded by the Bigfoot Field Researchers Organization as the "best written book on the subject". It has been re-issued in more recent times (2006), along with On the Track of the Sasquatch (1968) and Encounters with Bigfoot (1980) as combined reprints with an update under the new title of The Best of Sasquatch Bigfoot (2004).

Green was featured in Sasquatch Odyssey, a documentary film by Peter von Puttkamer profiling the then four leading sasquatch researchers.

A tribute event to John Green was held in Harrison Hot Springs from April 8–10, 2011.

He, Peter Byrne, René Dahinden, and Grover Krantz have been dubbed the “Four Horsemen of Sasquatchery”.

== Personal life ==
John Willison Green, was born on February 12, 1927, in Vancouver, British Columbia, Canada, died May 28, 2016, in Chilliwack, British Columbia, Canada, at the age 89.

A graduate of UBC, Green received his master's degree in journalism from Columbia University in New York at age 20 (1947).

Green met June while in the Navy, and they married in 1948, living in Toronto, Vancouver, and Victoria, before moving to the Agassiz-Harrison, British Columbia area where they raised their children and published the local newspaper for many years.

In 1954 he settled in Agassiz, BC with his wife June & raised their children. It was then he purchased the local newspaper becoming the owner and editor of the Agassiz-Harrison Advance.

In 1963 he was elected Mayor of the Village of Harrison Hot Springs. While Mayor he was responsible for the construction of the Harrison lakefront beach, where he spearheaded the World Championship Sand Sculpture Competition for many years.

In 1972 Green sold the local paper to pursue his Sasquatch research and interest in writing publications.

Green loved history and this passion drove him to be a champion of the Kilby Historic Site by founding the Kilby Historical Society in 1973. Later, the Fraser Heritage Society was formed where he continued to donate not only his time but funds to go towards the maintenance of the site. In total, he was a board member for over 40 years.

Mr. Green was honored in 2000 as BC Senior of the Year for his volunteerism in many community groups, including the Chamber of Commerce, Senior Citizens Housing, Harrison Hot Springs Fire Department, Boy Scouts, Search and Rescue & the Lions Club.

== Books ==
- On the Track of the Sasquatch (1968) (ISBN 0-88839-341-5)
- Year of the Sasquatch (1970)
- The Sasquatch File (1973)
- Sasquatch: The Apes Among Us (1978) (ISBN 0-88839-018-1)
- Encounters with Bigfoot (1980) (ISBN 0-88839-340-7)
- The Best of Sasquatch Bigfoot (2004) (ISBN 0-88839-546-9)
