= Monsters and Mysteries in America =

- Genre: Reality
- Narrated by: Roger Rose
- Country of origin: United States
- Original language: English
- No. of seasons: 3
- No. of episodes: 28

Production
- Executive producers: Fay Yu; Mike Sinclair
- Camera setup: Multiple
- Running time: 45 minutes
- Production company: M2 Pictures

Original release
- Network: Destination America
- Release: March 24, 2013 – April 1, 2015

Monsters and Mysteries in America is an American documentary television series that premiered March 24, 2013 to April 1, 2015 on Destination America. Repeats air on the network's sister-station, the Discovery Channel. It also sometimes airs on Animal Planet, particularly during one of their "Monster weeks". In the United Kingdom, the series airs on the Sky-owned television channel Pick as Monsters and Mysteries.

== Overview ==
Unlike predecessors such as In Search of... and MonsterQuest, the series includes numerous legends in each episode and features first-person witness encounters. Each episode is split into three segments, all focusing on one particular monster, legend, or phenomenon. Ron Bowman has served as show runner and writer since the series' launch. In Season 1 episodes focused on a specific region in the United States; in later seasons, stories within episodes were based on a variety of towns all around the country. Lyle Blackburn of Rue-Morgue.com has served as consultant and expert. AmericanMonsters.com co-founder Rob Morphy has served, among others, as a consultant and illustrator for the program.

== Episodes ==
=== Series overview ===
Season	Episodes	Originally released	
Season	Episodes	First released	Last released
1	6	March 24, 2013	April 28, 2013
2	12	December 15, 2013	March 14, 2014
3	10	January 17, 2015	April 1, 2015

=== Season 1 (2013) ===
No. overall	No. in season	Title	Original release date
1	1	"Appalachia: Sheepsquatch, Kentucky Green Men, Mothman"	March 24, 2013
In Hardinsburg, Kentucky, two life-long friends encounter a horrid beast known as Sheepsquatch. In Kelly, Kentucky, a family is terrorized by aliens from another world, and in Point Pleasant, West Virginia, the locals report sightings of a winged beast known as the Mothman.
2	2	"Pacific Northwest: Sasquatch, Shanghai Tunnels, Flathead Lake Monster"	March 31, 2013
In Republic, Washington, a hunter reports an encounter with Bigfoot that ended with him shooting the creature. In Portland, the legendary "Shanghai Tunnels" are the final resting place of angry spirits, as well as a spirit who can turn into a wolf. Finally, in Polson, Montana, the locals are afraid to venture into the waters on the local lake, in fear that a monster is hunting them as prey.
3	3	"Ozarks: Fouke Monster, Pope Lick Monster, Spooklight"	April 7, 2013
A woman in Fouke, Arkansas recounts how her family's rural property was trespassed upon by a legendary mountain beast. In Kentucky, the reports of a ghostly light frighten locals. Even more terrifying is a half-man/half-goat creature that lures the innocent to their deaths.
4	4	"Badlands: Devil's Highway, Black Eyed Kids, Curse Of Superstition Mountains"	April 14, 2013
Along the landscape of the badlands, truckers report horrific encounters with ghostly entities and UFOs. In Amarillo, Texas, a man has an encounter with children who appear to be more than they truly are, and in Safford, Arizona, hikers looking for lost treasure meet horrible fates, possibly at the hands of a curse on the land.
5	5	"The Swamp: Rougarou, Honey Island Swamp Monster, Vampire"	April 21, 2013
The swamps of Slidell, Louisiana are what a massive Bigfoot-like creature calls home. Children encounter a demonic werewolf-like creature in their rural home. Vampires may be prowling the streets of New Orleans in search of their next meal.
6	6	"Desert Wasteland: Thunderbirds & Skinwalkers, Nightstalker, Harvesting Humans (Alien Abduction)"	April 28, 2013
In Farmington, New Mexico, locals report encounters with the mystical Skinwalker and cattle deaths at the hands of a flying monstrosity. In Upper Fruitland, New Mexico a young woman is terrorized by a demon who won't stop until it has gotten her, and finally in Las Vegas a man reports multiple abductions by alien beings since childhood.

=== Season 2 (2013–14) ===
No. overall	No. in season	Title	Original release date
7	1	"Texas: Lake Worth Monster (Goat Man), Chupacabra, Zombie Soldiers"	December 15, 2013
In Lake Worth, Texas, teenagers are attacked by a Goatman creature prowling the woods. The residents of Cuero, Texas are plagued by livestock deaths where the blood has been sucked from the animals, leading them to believe it is the work of the legendary Chupacabra and on the outskirts of Brownsville, Texas a couple encounters soldiers who've seemingly come from another time.
8	2	"Massachusetts: Pukwudgie, Alien Brood, Dover Demon"	December 22, 2013
In Raynham, Massachusetts townspeople encounter the deadly and mysterious Pukwudgie. Twin sisters in Bridgewater, Massachusetts are abducted by aliens and used in breeding experiments. Finally, locals come forth in Dover, Massachusetts about their encounters with the legendary Dover Demon.
9	3	"Prairie Land: Momo, Shadow People, Van Meter Monster (Bat Monster)"	December 29, 2013
In Louisiana, Missouri, the residents are frightened by a Sasquatch-like monster called MoMo, who is attacking and killing dogs. A man in Maryville, Missouri is stalked by a malevolent shadow being. In Van Meter, Iowa in 1903, the locals live in fear of a flying beast who appears over their town and seems to have originated from a local mineshaft.
10	4	"Great Lakes: Wolfman, Dogman, Wendigo"	January 5, 2014
In Elkhorn, Wisconsin, townspeople are confronted by a horrific werewolf creature who's stalked the land for centuries. A repo man in Flat Rock, Michigan comes face to face with the mythical Dogman while on a routine job one fateful night. In Warroad, Minnesota, the legendary Wendigo prowls the land, looking for its next victims.
11	5	"California: Bigfoot Wars, Evil Gnome, Hell Hound"	January 12, 2014
Hunters are stalked by Bigfoot during an annual trip to the mountains in Colfax, California. A gnome-like creature harasses a family in Porterville, California. Residents in Palm Springs, California are witness to Hellhounds running through the streets one night in 2013.
12	6	"South East: Skunk Ape, Pascagoula Aliens, Lizard Man"	January 19, 2014
Boy scouts in Myakka City, Florida become the targets of a creature known as "Skunk Ape". In Pascagoula, Mississippi, two men report being the victims of one of the most bizarre alien abduction cases in recorded history. Residents in Bishopville, South Carolina are targets of a swamp-dwelling beast known as the Lizardman.
13	7	"Humanoids: Green-Clawed Beast, Big Muddy Monster, Grassman"	January 26, 2014
In Evansville, Indiana, a woman reports being attacked in the Ohio River by a bizarre aquatic beast; even stranger is the US Government warning her never to tell to anyone the story. Murphysboro, Illinois is the stomping grounds of a creature known as the Big Muddy Monster. A family in Cambridge, Ohio is hunted by the Ohio Grassman, a violent cousin of Bigfoot, and a hunter in Zanesville, Ohio becomes the target of harassment by the Grassman.
14	8	"Winged Beasts: Flying Humanoid, Jersey Devil, Batsquatch"	February 16, 2014
In Nevada, Missouri, a pair of brothers are attacked in the woods by a flying beast. The Pine Barrens of New Jersey are the home of a demonic creature who may be the spawn of Satan. Locals in Hidalgo, Texas are terrified of a flying creature called Batsquatch.
15	9	"Aliens: Abduction No.1 (Betty & Barney Hill Case), Aliens Cloned My Husband, Alien Matrix"	February 23, 2014
In Ashland, New Hampshire, Betty and Barney Hill become known as the first victims of alien abduction. A woman from Albuquerque, New Mexico grieves for her husband's death only to learn he may have been cloned by aliens. A man in Wiggins, Mississippi is taken by aliens to be trained for a future war.
16	10	"Spirits: The Rake, Sykesville Monster, Lechuza"	February 28, 2014
A demonic creature attempts to murder a woman in Erie, Pennsylvania. Residents in Sykesville, Maryland report seeing a monster roaming the forest, the creature soon becomes a subject of an FBI investigation. Youths in Roswell, New Mexico become the targets of a legendary bird-like beast who was summoned long ago by a murdered witch.
17	11	"Outcasts: Melonheads, Devil Monkey, Blue Albino Woman (Witch)"	March 7, 2014
Reports of the Melonheads, creatures with an unknown origin arise from Kirtland, Ohio, Trumbull, Connecticut and Naples, Florida. A humanoid primate creature terrorizes locals in West Point, Kentucky and Saltville, Virginia. The spirit of a witch who was killed centuries ago is roaming the streets of Topeka, Kansas, putting fear into the locals.
18	12	"Wilderness: UFO Bigfoot, Lake Pepin Monster, Cajun Werewolf"	March 14, 2014
In Ohiopyle, Pennsylvania, teenagers come forward with both sightings of an alien spacecraft and Bigfoot, leading some to believe the two are connected. In Lake City, Minnesota, townspeople along the shores of Lake Pepin are attacked and in fear of a monster believed to live in the lake. Outdoors men in Slidell, Louisiana report coming face to face with a wolfman-like beast.

=== Season 3 (2015) ===
No. overall	No. in season	Title	Original release date
19	1	"Men in Black"	January 17, 2015
Reports coming from Parkersburg, West Virginia to Dale, Pennsylvania of encounters with the Men in Black, suited men who appear when extraterrestrial sightings and activity occur, among the reported encounters with these beings is another from Lincoln, Nebraska which points to the MIBs as being diabolical, possibly even demonic in nature, as well as the story Woodrow Derenberger's encounters with infamous and mysterious Indrid Cold A.K.A. "The Grinning Man", a possible alien MIB.
20	2	"Tennessee Wildman, Subterranean Reptoids"	January 24, 2015
A recount of the legendary encounter in Rockwood, Tennessee with a Bigfoot-like creature known as the Wildman, and an examination of stories of Reptoid creatures lurking beneath the streets of Los Angeles.
21	3	"Sabine Thing, Lightning Psychic"	January 31, 2015
A day by the water in Many, Louisiana turns into a nightmare as a group is terrorized by fearsome creatures lurking along the Sabine River. Lightning strikes can be fatal, but two survivors develop astonishing psychic powers that they’ve used to help solve crimes.
22	4	"Florida Zombie, Dybbuk Box, Shenango Dog Boy"	February 7, 2015
In Delray Beach, Florida a terrible unseen force turns normal men into zombies who get a craving for human flesh. Tragedy befalls anyone who encounters a cursed Dybbuk Box, while young girls are being hunted by the Shenango Dog Boy in Mercer, Pennsylvania.
23	5	"Vermont Pigman, Bridge Where I Died, Project Stargate"	February 18, 2015
In Northfield, Vermont the legendary Pigman unleashes a beastly wrath upon trespassing teenagers; an alluring hitchhiker in Jamestown, North Carolina has monstrous plans for anyone who gives her a ride; and the classified details of a secret government program using psychic spies.
24	6	"Mill Race Monster, Toxic Rain, Devil Dogs"	February 25, 2015
In Columbus, Indiana a swampy beast's terrifying attacks lead to the largest monster hunt in U.S. history. Bizarre gel-like rain sickens residents in Oakville, Washington; could the military be to blame? And hungry Devil Dogs guard a cursed Wisconsin island.
25	7	"Carolina Reptile Man, Succubus, Napa Rebobs"	March 11, 2015
A cold-blooded reptilian beast preys upon unsuspecting campers along the South Carolina coast. A seductive succubus with a taste for terror targets a young rock musician in Springfield, Missouri, as well as a corrections officer in South Boston, Virginia. A mad scientist's monstrous flying monkeys unleash their wrath upon Napa Valley.
26	8	"Mantis Man, Spottsville Monster, Tornado Phantoms"	March 18, 2015
An entire family takes up arms in a rooftop showdown with the Spottsville Monster, a vicious beast with a taste for flesh. In Joplin, Missouri, eerie Phantoms protect survivors of one of America's most deadly tornadoes and fishermen near Hackettstown, New Jersey face off with a gigantic bug.
27	9	"Demon Panthers, Helicopter Crew Meets UFO, Doppelganger"	March 25, 2015
Across Southern Illinois, townsfolk arm themselves against a demonic feline predator. A teenage girl tangles with a terrifying doppelganger in Oviedo, Florida that attempts to steal her life. Two police chopper pilots in air combat with a UFO trying to shoot them down.
28	10	"The John Keel Files Special"	April 1, 2015
In the late 1960s the town of Point Pleasant, West Virginia is besieged by a series of monstrous creatures, blood-seeking UFOs, and mysterious men in black. Two reporters seek answers, culminating in one of the deadliest disasters in U.S. history.

== Reviews ==
Allison Keene of The Hollywood Reporter describes the series: "This series... seems born from a genuine place, which deserves some credit. It's refreshing in its lack of snark, and even though there are many unintentionally hilarious moments... it's not the exploitation TV that is rampant in the current documentary scene."

== See also ==
- Unsolved Mysteries
- Sightings
- MonsterQuest
