= Mogollon Monster =

Creature of Arizona folklore

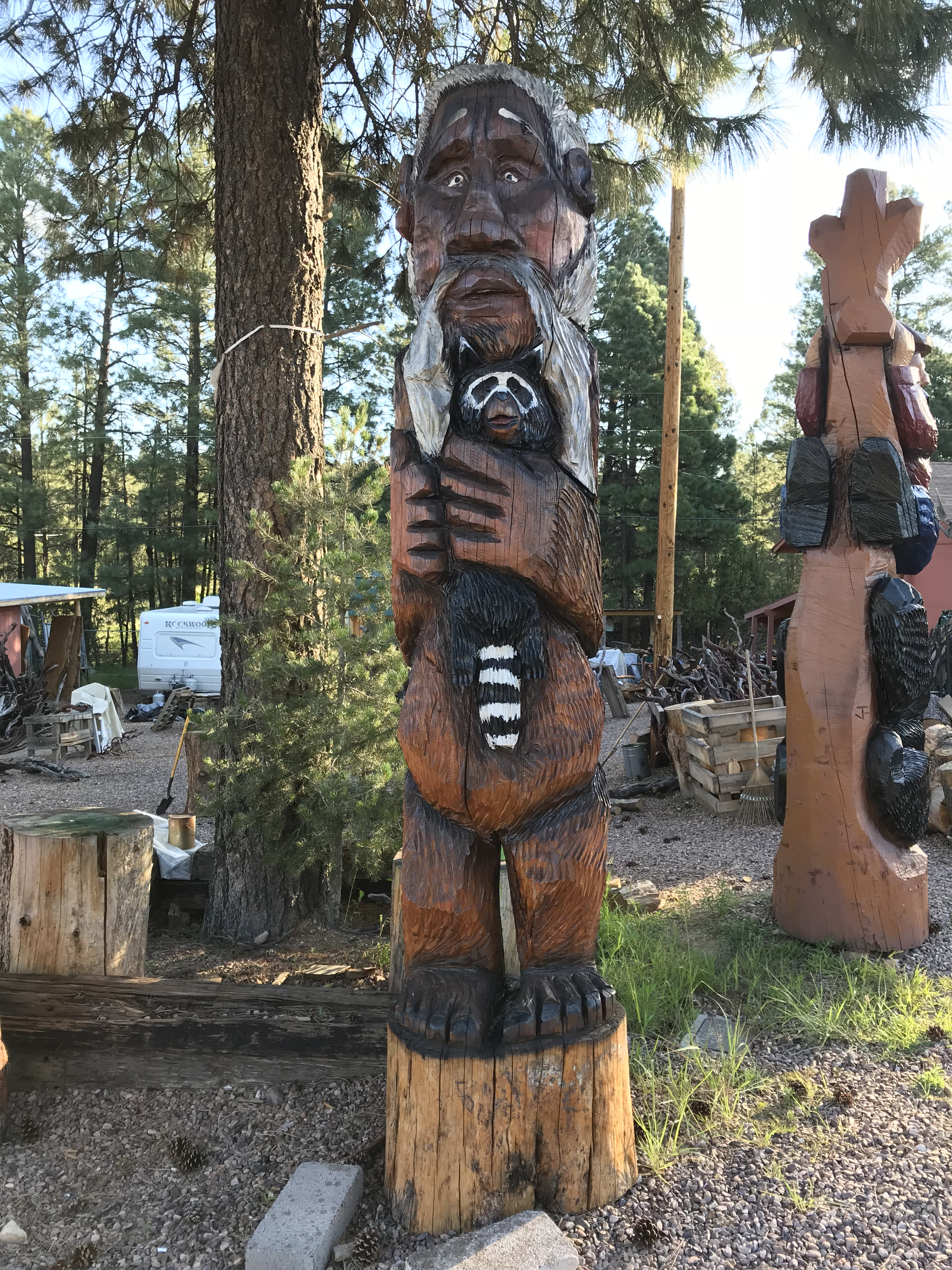
Mogollon Monster Wood Carving

The Mogollon Monster (/mʌɡɪˈjoʊn/ or /moʊɡəˈjoʊn/), also known as the Arizona Bigfoot, is an ape-like creature, similar to descriptions of Bigfoot, purported to dwell in central and eastern Arizona along the Mogollon Rim.

== Description ==
The Mogollon Monster is commonly described as a large bipedal hominin with a height in excess of 7 feet (2 m) that possesses large red eyes. Its body is said to be covered in long black or reddish-brown hair, with the exclusion of the chest, face, hands, and feet. Reports allege that the creature emits a strong and pungent odor reminiscent of "dead fish, a skunk with bad body odor, decaying peat moss and the musk of a snapping turtle".

Anecdotal reports indicate the Mogollon Monster is purportedly nocturnal, omnivorous, territorial, and sometimes violent. It is generally reported to walk with wide inhuman strides, leave behind footprints measuring 560 millimetres (22 in), mimic birds and other wildlife like coyotes, produce unusual whistling sounds, explore campsites after dark, hurl stones from locations that are hidden from view, and build nests out of pine needles, twigs, and leaves. Further, it has also been said to decapitate deer and other wildlife prior to consumption. In numerous reports, it has been claimed that the animal can generate a cry similar to a "blood-curdling" scream; described as sounding like a woman in "great distress". Accounts of the creature describe an "eerie silence prior to the encounter, an appreciable stillness in the woods that commonly surrounds predatory animals".

== History ==
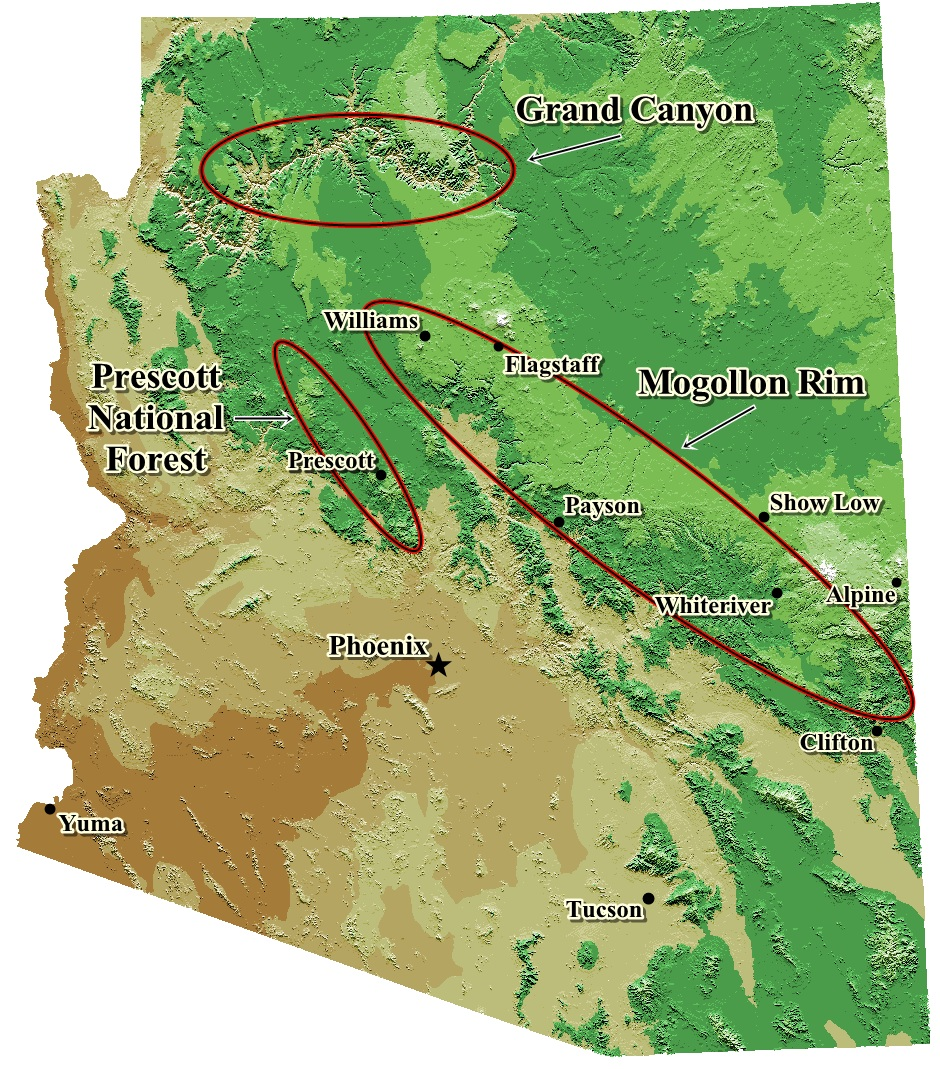
The majority of Mogollon Monster sightings are said to occur in the Ponderosa pine forests of the Mogollon Rim.

Reported sightings range along Arizona's Mogollon Rim, from Prescott north to Williams, southeast to Alpine, south to Clifton, and northwest back to Prescott.

The oldest known reported sighting was in the 1903 edition of The Arizona Republican, in which I.W. Stevens described a creature witnessed near the Grand Canyon as having "long white hair and [a] matted beard that reached to his knees. It wore no clothing, and upon his talon-like fingers were claws at least two inches long." Upon further inspection, he noted "a coat of gray hair nearly covered his body, with here and there a spot of dirty skin showing." He later stated that after he discovered the creature drinking the blood of two cougars, it threatened him with a club, and "screamed the wildest, most unearthly screech".

Cryptozoologist Don Davis alleged that during the mid-1940s, while he was on a Boy Scout trip near Payson, Arizona, he likewise saw the Mogollon Monster: "The creature was huge. Its eyes were deep set and hard to see, but they seemed expressionless. His face seemed pretty much devoid of hair, but there seemed to be hair along the sides of his face. His chest, shoulders, and arms were massive, especially the upper arms; easily upwards of 6 inches in diameter, perhaps much, much more. I could see he was pretty hairy, but didn't observe really how thick the body hair was. The face/head was very square; square sides and squared up chin, like a box". Marjorie Grimes, a resident of Whiteriver, Arizona, claimed to have sighted the creature a number of times between 1982 and 2004. She described the creature as black, tall, and walking with long strides.

A number of people on the Fort Apache Indian Reservation have also claimed eyewitness accounts.

== Investigation ==
Stan Lindstedt, professor emeritus of biology from Northern Arizona University, dismisses the idea that a large humanoid creature could remain hidden in such a large area of the country. "I put that in the category of mythology that can certainly make our culture interesting, but has nothing to do with science."

Generally, the scientific community attributes creature sightings to either hoaxes or misidentification. As recently as the early 1930s, grizzly bears roamed the forests of Arizona. Other large mammals such as black bears, mountain lions, and elk may also account for sightings.

== In popular culture ==
The Mogollon Monster has become an object of Arizona folklore. One such story involves Arizona pioneer, Sam Spade, building a log cabin on land adjacent to what is now Camp Geronimo in northern Arizona, only to be attacked by the creature. Later, his son Bill Spade and his soon to be wife are killed by the creature on their wedding day. Other stories explain the origins of the Mogollon Monster implicating a tormented Native American bent on revenge, or a chief transforming to scare away his former clan. Another story involves a pioneer who is attacked by Native Americans, escapes, but is cursed by the spirits and goes insane. Still another story describes the creature as the "phantom of a white man who, as punishment for murdering a Native American woman, was hung from a tree by his hands, stretched to a height of eight feet, then skinned alive and left to die. Damned by the spirits, his ghost continues to roam the woods as the tragically misnamed Skinwalker".

The monster is also a topic in guides on local color and works of fiction, including the following:

- "Abstracts of folklore studies". Abstracts of Folklore Studies. 10–11. American Folklore Society. 1974. ISSN 0001-3587. OCLC 1460586.
- "Weird Arizona: Your Travel Guide to Arizona's Local Legends and Best Kept Secrets". Sterling Publishing. 2007. ISBN 978-1402739385.

The creature is also present in the works of Dolan Ellis, who used a song named "Mogollon Monster" in a campaign against littering, especially in the wilderness areas of Arizona, claiming that the monster targeted those who carelessly littered in its territory.

== See also ==
- Bigfoot
- Fouke Monster
- Honey Island Swamp monster
- Momo the Monster
- Skunk ape
