= List of Lost Tapes episodes =

The following is a list of episodes of Lost Tapes, a thriller horror docudrama television series that airs on the Animal Planet channel. Each episode is either "TV-PG" followed by V or L, or "TV-14" followed by V or L. The plot of each episode is described, below, using in-universe tone.

== Series overview ==
Season	Episodes	Originally released	
Season	Episodes	First released	Last released
1	14	October 30, 2008	February 17, 2009
2	10	September 29, 2009	November 24, 2009
3	10	September 28, 2010	November 9, 2010

== Episodes ==
=== Season 1 (2008–2009) ===
No. overall	No. in season	Title	Subject matter	Original release date
1	1	"Chupacabra"	Chupacabra	October 30, 2008
In 2006, while celebrating their daughter Ava's 9th birthday in Nogales, Mexico, Carlos and Maritza Ramirez receive a letter from a relative in the United States, saying that they will be brought across the border into Arizona. Despite the concerns of both Maritza and Ava's grandmother, Rosa, Carlos is excited. Two days later, the Ramirezes hire a smuggler to take them to America. However, the smuggler, who is implied to be a Mexican drug cartel member, stops two hours from the border, forces them out at gunpoint and abandons them, taking their possessions and supplies with him. Seeing no other choice, the Ramirezes continue on foot. As they reach the border, they are suddenly attacked by a large dog-like predator. Meanwhile, United States Border Patrol agents, Tom Valentine and Martin Santino, receive a report about the Ramirezes' illegal crossing attempt and move to apprehend them. When they arrive, they find Carlos and Maritza's exsanguinated corpses and a terrified yet unhurt Ava. After taking her to their car, the agents encounter and open fire on a strange creature before backup arrives. Their official report states Ava's parents died of unknown causes and makes no mention of the creature, while Ava is returned to Nogales, plagued by nightmares of her ordeal.
2	2	"Bigfoot"	Bigfoot	October 30, 2008
In 2005, forest ranger Rachel Glen studies the declining black bear population in the Pacific Northwest and records her findings on various cameras. Over the course of her study, she reports strange noises and the feeling of being watched. After setting up a camera trap, she hears a strange wailing sound and tracks it, but gets snared by a poacher's trap. As she disables several other illegal traps, the poacher responds by destroying her cameras, some of which capture glimpses of an unidentified hairy creature. Growing suspicious over her cameras' findings, Glen later discovers a den with strange hair. She sends the hair to the game warden, who tells her it belongs to an unknown species of primate. After Glen discovers that the poacher has been stalking her, she requests backup, but has to wait 48 hours due to her outpost's remoteness. In her study's final hours, Glen hears the poacher trying to break into her cabin, followed by cries for help and unnerving screams and growls. She then discovers that the poacher has been killed by an unknown creature. Afterwards, the black bear population begins to rise, but no confirmation of a new or unusual species emerges.
3	3	"Monster of Monterey"	New Nessie	January 6, 2009
In 2007, journalist and outdoor enthusiast Sharon Novak enters the final day of her solo global sailing trip, with several cameras broadcasting her journey live over the Internet. However, she receives a partial distress call from another boat at the Monterey Canyon. Using her boat's engine, she travels to the location, but her boat hits something underwater, killing the engine. Novak dives underwater to investigate and emerges with a chunk of flesh that was stuck to her motor. She eventually reaches the other boat, only to find it unoccupied and covered in blood. Worried for her safety, Novak tries to call the Coast Guard, but fails to make contact. As she leaves, something rams her boat, killing the engine again. Frightened, she contacts her boyfriend, Charles, and tells him everything that has happened. They agree that she should sail towards shore and stay out of the water, while he calls the Coast Guard. Suddenly, the boat is rammed again and Novak falls overboard. Charles tries to help her, but she is unable to reach her boat as a large plesiosaur-like creature attacks her. Novak's remains go unrecovered despite an extensive search while her attacker remains unidentified.
4	4	"Swamp Creature"	Honey Island Swamp monster	January 6, 2009
In 2006, university professor Diane Chasny and her nephew Ethan examine the Honey Island Swamp's ecosystem and alligator population following Hurricane Katrina. While testing her equipment, an alligator destroys her backpack, which contained her navigational tools. While trying to find their way out, Chasny and Ethan become lost, but encounter a local fisherman, Bud Ray, who agrees to help them. Along the way, Ethan briefly gets separated and accidentally steps on a nest of eggs. The trio later discover a bizarre footprint and Ray urges them to get to his camp by nightfall. He later tells Chasny and Ethan stories of a purported half-man, half-alligator creature, but she dismisses them as superstitions. Around midnight, Ray awakens Chasny and Ethan before leaving the tent. They hear sounds of a struggle before an unknown creature tries to enter the tent. However, an injured Ray returns and the three fend off the creature, which leaves behind eggshells from the nest Ethan destroyed. Chasny recovers the eggshells, but finds they match no known species. Ethan eventually returns to the swamp to create a documentary based on his adventures while Ray recovers, but becomes fearful of going out in the swamp after sunset.
5	5	"Oklahoma Octopus"	Oklahoma Octopus	January 13, 2009
In 2008, high school graduates Sean Conklin, Tracy Miller, Tyler Shuman, Bruce Delroy, and Ruthie Semple decide to spend their last weekend together at a local lake. Upon arriving however, Conklin sees several large tentacles splashing in the water, but no one else sees them and dismisses his concerns. After Shuman finds a canoe, the group heads out to a floating platform. As the day progresses, Shuman pulls several pranks on his friends. They scold him, but he gets upset and leaves with the canoe. Conklin assures his friends that Shuman will return, but they hear him scream and see that the canoe has been capsized. Despite the others assuming it is another prank, Delroy attempts to find Shuman, but something pulls him underwater. The remaining three yell for help until night falls, but what appears to be a giant octopus grabs Semple and pulls her off the platform. Seeing no other choice, Conklin and Miller attempt to swim to shore. They are later found alive and treated for exhaustion, shock, and unidentified blister-like wounds, while their friends' bodies are never found.
6	6	"Devil Dragon"	Megalania	January 20, 2009
In 2007, amateur adventurer Tim Akrin attempts to film the pilot episode of his survival reality show, Stranded, in Australia's Daintree Rainforest. On day one, he attempts to show his audience how to look for food. Along the way, he discovers human bones and mentions several likely predators, like saltwater crocodiles. He later discovers a den and tries to identify its occupant, but gets bitten by it before he can. After bandaging his wound, he tries to start a campfire, but his injury prevents him. That night, he hears strange sounds and tries to scare off the creature making them, but to no avail. The next day, a sickly Akrin finds his arm has become infected with a form of blood poisoning. Realizing his injury's severity, he decides to try and reach a nearby Aboriginal village. While making the trek however, his infection worsens and he gets lost. Knowing he may not survive, he sends a message to his family before a creature attacks him and drags him away. His body is never found, but Aboriginal trail guides find his camera. Saliva found on it was tested and found not to match any known reptile species.
7	7	"Cave Demons"	Olitiau	January 27, 2009
In 2001, the USMC send Sergeant Carlos Ramos and Corporals Latrel Wade and Derek Sawyer to investigate bizarre interference disrupting their sonar-based cave-mapping system at Tora Bora. The marines enter a cave and use a tracking device to pinpoint a signal believed to be causing the interference. However, Wade accidentally steps on a land mine and falls into a chamber below, breaking his back. As Ramos and Sawyer climb down to him, Wade sees a large creature fly past him. Upon reuniting, Wade tells them what he saw, frightening Sawyer while Ramos is skeptical. Due to Wade's injuries, Ramos opts to temporarily leave him behind, but Wade is attacked by a bat-like creature. The other marines return to him, but find him dead. Believing insurgents killed him, Ramos tells a distraught Sawyer they have to finish the mission. As they head deeper into the caves, they are surrounded by a nest of the creatures and open fire. Nine hours later, a rescue team locates Ramos and takes him to a military hospital to treat him for a rare form of rabies. He is eventually reunited with his family following months of quarantine, while Wade and Sawyer's bodies are never found.
8	8	"Death Raptor"	Owlman	January 27, 2009
In 2007, paranormal investigators Peter Grey and Jolene Sharrock are called to a church in Fallview, California to investigate a mysterious winged creature believed by the locals to be haunting it and the surrounding forest. They encounter an old woman, Hazel Van Lear, who tells them of the local demon before she is driven off by Archdeacon Grant Bolton. Over interviews, Bolton says the demon has been disturbing his congregation for years and it has recently become more active, while Hazel believes it followed her from her native Mawnan, Cornwall. While investigating the belfry, the investigators discover an abnormally large owl pellet with a human mandible inside. After turning over their findings to the police, they interview Sue Ann Mills, a little girl who also claims to have seen the creature and believes that it is after her. Later that night, the investigators use Mills to lure the creature, which pursues them until Hazel emerges and sacrifices herself to it. The following morning, Grey relinquishes his tapes to the police before he and Sharrock suspend all future investigations. Hazel's body is never found while the creature is never seen again.
9	9	"Megaconda"	Yacumama	February 3, 2009
In 2008, animal rights activists Scott Sumner and Evan Medcaf investigate allegations of illegal animal trading in a warehouse owned by businessman Ken Tobar. Armed with a video camera, the pair break in and find several crates marked "LIVE ANIMALS". They venture deeper, but are confronted by security guard Larry Johnson and his guard dog Bishop. Johnson threatens to call the police, but they hear something break out of a nearby crate. Confirming the pair are alone and confiscating their tape, Johnson reluctantly goes to investigate, not realizing Medcaf brought a spare. Johnson finds a large empty crate broken open from the inside, and calls Tobar to report what happened, but Bishop runs off. Johnson searches for him, but eventually finds him dead. After re-shooting their evidence, Sumner and Medcaf try to leave, but get lost. They later find an enormous snakeskin, before something drags Sumner away. Medcaf flees, re-encountering Johnson on the way. Later, Tobar arrives in response to Johnson's call and is attacked by the creature. While neither it nor Tobar have been seen since, Medcaf and Johnson's testimony allow the FBI to raid the warehouse and seize numerous black market animals and body parts.
10	10	"Thunderbird"	Thunderbird	February 3, 2009
In 2007, brothers Kevin and Cole Weller sneak out to meet with their friend, Paxton Reed, to film a video of them skateboarding at "The Ditch". Reed doubts the young Cole's abilities, but Kevin convinces him to let Cole come. They enter a national park's restricted area, but as Cole leaves to relieve himself, a large raptor swoops down at the others. They tell the returning Cole about what happened, but he believes they are trying to scare him. Upon arriving at "The Ditch", they begin filming, but Reed startles Cole while he is performing a trick, causing him to fall and break his leg. Reed and Kevin reluctantly leave to get help, leaving behind a cellphone for Cole. On the way however, they hear a loud screech and receive a call from Cole asking for help. The pair run back, but find Cole missing. He is later found the next day at the bottom of a freeway overpass half a mile from "The Ditch", battered and bruised but still alive. He is unable to recall what happened and the mysterious animal was never found.
11	11	"Skinwalker"	Skin-walker	February 10, 2009
After spending two years at college studying political science, Andy Miller returns home to Skinwalker Ranch to visit his parents. Shortly after, Andy joins his father in driving out to the ranch to check on a mother sheep that recently gave birth. While the father tells Andy about a recent coyote problem, they pass a strange Native American woman wearing animal hides. Upon arriving, Andy notices coyote footprints that strangely turn into that of a human's before hearing his mother calling for him and his father from the truck. Believing it was the radio, they return, but learn the radio was off. Hearing a sheep's bleating, Andy's father grabs a rifle before the Millers head to the sheep pen. Andy's father shoots at a coyote, but it seemingly disappears. They later find the sheep dead and the lamb missing. After hearing what sounds like a pack of coyotes, the Millers drive back, but seemingly hit the woman from before. They get out to check, but find the missing lamb wrapped in the woman's hides. Afterwards, Andy returns to college and changes his study to Native American mythology while the coyote problem ceases.
12	12	"Mothman"	Mothman	February 10, 2009
In 1967, following the Silver Bridge's collapse, the FBI arrest a man named Roy Kirby, who had filmed the incident and events preceding it, on suspicion of being involved. During questioning, Kirby reveals his marriage deteriorated because of his apparent obsession with the Mothman, claiming to the disbelieving agents that he saw and filmed it over the course of two weeks even in spite of his similarly disbelieving wife. The day before the collapse, Kirby filmed himself at the site, claiming the Mothman drew him there to warn him. On the day of the event, he filmed the Mothman near the bridge and witnessed the collapse before rescuing a woman who also claimed to have seen it. Following an extensive investigation, no charges are brought against Kirby and the collapse is officially attributed to a structural flaw. Kirby returns home, vowing to never speak of the creature again, while the FBI confiscates his tapes. No further Mothman sightings are reported until a woman claims to have seen it before the I-35 collapse.
13	13	"Death Worm"	Mongolian death worm	February 17, 2009
In 2008, longtime friends and extreme sports enthusiasts Greg Cole and Benton Davis compete in an ATV race across the Gobi Desert per a tradition in which they push each other to new challenges each year. Though they become lost after nightfall, they believe they will be able to find their way after sunrise, and stop to rest. Suddenly, Cole is bitten by an unseen creature. Later that night, Cole is awakened by acid on his legs and an inability to feel them. Davis tries to start Cole's ATV, but the engine is dead. With his ATV still working, Davis gets Cole onto it and drives until it runs out of gas. Stranded, Davis experiences what feels like static electricity and Cole begs him to find help alone. Promising to return, Davis leaves, but both are attacked by subterranean creatures and dragged underground, though Davis manages to film a warning message before he is taken. Their bodies are never found, though their vehicles and camera were. Their deaths are officially attributed to heat exposure, and the strange burrows found around their equipment are never investigated.
14	14	"Hellhound"	Spectral black dog	February 17, 2009
In 2005, Goth college students Annabel Lilith, Ophelia, Luna, and Severin pick up Nora Callarman to induct her into their group, blindfolding her on the drive over to a local cemetery. Upon arriving, a large Rottweiler with glowing red eyes suddenly attacks their car before disappearing. Assuming it ran off, the group dismiss it and perform Callarman's initiation. Lilith asks the spirits for a sign, but the dog appears and disappears again. Most of the group are terrified, but Lilith assumes it was the sign she asked for and insists they finish. As the group leaves, Callarman and Severin break off to be together, but the dog appears once again. After hiding from it, they return to the others, who also saw it. Callarman warns them that seeing it three times results in an untimely death, but her claim incites an argument. They leave, but another argument distracts Lilith, causing her to crash into another car. After regaining consciousness, Callarman tries to awaken Severin, but realizes he is dead. She leaves with the dog, now sporting a friendly demeanor. In addition to Severin, Lilith, Ophelia, and Luna are all pronounced dead at the scene. An investigation found no official record of Callarman's existence, and, while no evidence of any dog was discovered, traces of sulfur were found in and around the car.

=== Season 2 (2009) ===
No. overall	No. in season	Title	Subject matter	Original release date
15	1	"Vampire"	Vampire	September 29, 2009
In 2009, the Redding family move into a new house after the father, Dennis, loses his job. The son, Eddie, sees his closet door open on its own before it closes while he is away. That night, a humanoid creature emerges from Eddie's closet and steals his teddy bear, Ruggles. He awakens and screams at the sight, causing it to flee into the closet before his parents arrive. They hear a scrabbling sound in the attic, but the parents assume they are raccoons and hire an exterminator, Stan Polanski, to address the problem the following day. While examining the basement, Polanski discovers several strange nests before a creature kills him. After the wife, Sarah, notices Polanski's absence, Eddie investigates, but finds Polanski's body before a creature emerges and chases him. Pursued by three of the creatures, the Reddings flee to Eddie's room and barricade the door, but a creature punches through and grabs Dennis. He grabs a chunk of wood and stabs the attacker, causing it to disappear while the other two flee. The Reddings escape and Polanski's exsanguinated body is recovered, while no sign of the creatures is reported. However, similar attacks begin to occur at a nearby mining village.
16	2	"Lizard Man"	Lizard Man of Scape Ore Swamp	September 29, 2009
In 2008, reporter Chrissy Cooper and her cameraman Derek Green follow local firefighters Trevor Andrews and Dana Caldwell into a sewer to rescue a lost cat after it was dragged into a storm drain. Upon entering, the group discover a mauled corpse they assume is the cat's. They begin to head back, but hear a cat meowing and attempt to locate it. Caldwell breaks off to find it, but hears something attack it before encountering a humanoid shape. Her scream attracts the others, but they only find her flashlight. Andrews tells the news crew to return to the surface while he finds Caldwell. He eventually finds her and scares off the creature looming over her. Meanwhile, Cooper and Green become lost before they are attacked by the creature. The firefighters rush to their aid, but find them dead and partially eaten. The creature pursues the firefighters, but Andrews severs one of its arms with an axe. Afterward, Caldwell is treated for her injuries while Cooper and Green's bodies are recovered. The firefighters turn over everything they have to the authorities, but DNA test results on the arm have not been released.
17	3	"Southern Sasquatch"	Fouke Monster	October 6, 2009
In 2007, Matthew Barton accompanies his fiancee, Abby Knox's, brothers, Levi and Corbin on a deer hunting trip in the forests of Fouke, Arkansas to bond with them. They spot a shape, which Levi shoots at, though it flees before they can identify it. While investigating its previous location, they find foul-smelling fur. After finding no sign of deer, the Knoxes send Barton on a snipe hunt. However, they see a huge creature behind Barton and shoot at it. They run over, but find Barton missing. Gathering their senses, they hear a growl nearby and follow it as night falls. Suddenly, the creature attacks and kills Levi. A panicked Corbin flees, bumping into Barton. They attempt to escape, but the creature eventually catches up to and kills them. After the trio's bodies are recovered, early news reports indicate that they were victims of a bear attack. However, Fouke locals regard the trio as victims of the Southern Sasquatch.
18	4	"Werewolf"	Werewolf	October 13, 2009
Independent filmmaker Austin Pace arranges access to follow Sergeants Clifford Warren and Javier Mendoza's investigation into an animalistic serial killer, nicknamed "The Beast Killer", for a documentary. Staking out a bar that the killer's victims went to, the officers notice a suspicious man flirting with a woman, Sophie Montero. As the officers and Pace follow the couple to a suburban house, they learn that the suspect has been previously arrested for assault. After the suspect closes the blinds, the officers and Pace are forced to move closer. While making their approach, they hear a yell and growling and enter the house. Inside, they find fur and bloody paw prints. Warren breaks off while Mendoza and Pace search the basement, where they find an injured Montero. Mendoza tells Pace to stay with her while he finds Warren. The officers find the suspect dead in a manner akin to the Beast Killer's victims, and realize that Montero is the culprit. They return to warn Pace, but Montero takes on a beastly appearance and kills Pace before the officers kill her in turn. Montero is posthumously named as Pace and the suspect's killer, while the officers are given paid psychiatric leave, later resigning from the force. The case of the Beast Killer, however, remains open, with no mention of a "werewolf" in the official files.
19	5	"Death Crawler"	Gigantic centipede	October 20, 2009
In 2002, entomologists Karen and Jonah Urco become stranded on an uncharted and uninhabited island due to engine trouble. While he makes repairs, she explores the jungle, discovering exceptionally large walking-sticks and tarantulas before finding a human skeleton clutching a video camera. She takes the camera and brings Jonah to see the skeleton, but a giant centipede bites him, causing him to become ill. As he comes down with a fever and his wound festers hours later, Karen starts to leave their camp, but sees another giant centipede nearby. She examines the camera's film to determine the island's location, but learns a previous group had been killed by the centipedes. Spying a medical kit in the film, she returns to the jungle to search for it. She eventually finds it and returns to Jonah just as two giant centipedes attack. Karen drives them off before bringing Jonah to their skiff so they can escape. As the skiff leaves the island, however, a hissing sound comes from within the boat. Several weeks later, the skiff washes ashore on the Florida coast with the Urcoses' decomposed bodies in it. Unidentified tracks leading from the boat to the brush are also found, while the island's location remains unknown.
20	6	"White River Monster"	White River Monster	October 27, 2009
In 2009, Mac Barrett and Tyler Crenshaw want to try catfish noodling in the White River, but experienced fishing guide Earl Gaines refuses to take them to any of the fishing spots they suggest. When Barrett and Crenshaw question Gaines, he eventually admits he is worried about the fabled White River Monster's presence, but the pair mock him before goading him into visiting a spot on the river. While giving a demonstration however, Gaines is bitten by an unidentified creature. He drives it off and insists on leaving, but Barrett and Crenshaw dismiss him, forcing Gaines to reluctantly stay. As Barrett and Crenshaw make an unsuccessful noodling attempt, Barrett gets stuck. Gaines tries to help him, but something pulls him underwater, causing the others to panic. Crenshaw retrieves a shovel to free Barrett, but is attacked and killed by the creature. Alone, Barrett tries in vain to call for help until a gigantic fish rams him, freeing him and allowing him to swim to safety. Despite suffering a fractured foot, Barrett survives to petition the Arkansas government to drag the river to find Crenshaw, Gaines, and the creature, but is repeatedly denied, while the deaths are officially attributed to alligator attacks.
21	7	"Jersey Devil"	Jersey Devil	November 3, 2009
In 2006, Greg and Wendy Stark, the latter of whom is pregnant, return from a Jersey Shore vacation with their daughters Christina and Joey and dog Cooper through the Pine Barrens. However, Greg accidentally hits an unidentified animal. When the Starks pull over to investigate, Cooper runs off. Greg leaves to find him, but fails to return after an hour, forcing the remaining Starks to find him. They find Greg's bloodied hat before hearing a loud roar and run to an abandoned house. Greg turns up and tells everyone to hide just as the creature attempts to break in. Hearing Cooper barking, the daughters urge him to scare off the creature, but it kills Cooper before barging in. The Starks hide, but Christina's cellphone goes off, attracting the creature. Wendy drives it off with a large plank before suddenly going into labor. As night falls, the Starks run back to their car and escape as the creature flies overhead. Arriving at a nearby hospital, Wendy gives birth to a son while Greg receives treatment for minor injuries. The authorities are unable to locate Cooper or the creature.
22	8	"Alien"	Insectoid alien	November 10, 2009
In 2008, astronaut Captain Miranda Bach is placed in the care of psychiatrist Dr. Lee Morris and internist Dr. Rebecca Damon after inhaling comet dust. Damon becomes concerned after discovering a bizarre rash on Bach and two distinct heartbeats. After an X-ray reveals an unidentified object in Bach's chest, Damon theorizes it is a mutated parasite. As Morris plans to move Bach to a secure facility, an alarm goes off. The doctors and security guard Alzedo rush to Bach, but find her dead and with a large cavity in her chest. Suddenly, an insectoid creature swoops at them before flying out of the room. Realizing it cannot escape, the doctors put the building on lockdown. Most of the staff and patients evacuate in time, but Morris, Damon, and Alzedo are trapped. The creature kills Alzedo and Morris before Damon breaks the quarantine, inadvertently allowing the creature to escape. The government confiscates and classifies all records of the creature's existence and what happened at the hospital, while Bach, Alzedo, and Morris's official causes of death remain unknown. While the creature is never found, spores similar to the ones Bach inhaled are detected as far off as South America.
23	9	"Bear Lake Monster"	Bear Lake Monster	November 17, 2009
In 2008, Erica Jameson, Jan Hollis, Rose Peters, Sally Rudolph, and Mary Allen Stewart celebrate Jameson's 22nd birthday at Bear Lake, Utah. When Hollis uses her cellphone to record the proceedings, the others play keep-away with it, but accidentally throw it into the lake. As they search for it, Jameson feels something brush up against her twice and returns to shore, but the others dismiss it. Peters eventually finds the phone, but keeps it with her. Later that night, an unidentified creature pulls Peters underwater. The others try to find her, with Hollis entering the lake to do so. Seeing something in the water, the girls urge Hollis to come back, but something drags her away. Rudolph leaves to find help while Jameson and Stewart mourn their missing friends. After seeing something move near their camp, the pair flee to Stewart's car to escape, but Stewart realizes she left her keys behind. As the creature attacks the car, Rudolph returns. Jameson and Stewart run for it, but the creature kills the latter. Jameson and Rudolph escape and tell the police what happened, though their friends' bodies are never recovered.
24	10	"Dover Demon"	Dover Demon	November 24, 2009
In 2007, unemployed construction worker Chad Hurliss recruits his wife, Shannah, and friends, Glenn Diffy and Royce Best, to film a fake Dover Demon sighting in Dover, Massachusetts. Diffy expresses concern, but the skeptical Chad berates him. The group eventually reaches a suitable spot in the woods, with Best donning a monster costume before he and Shannah walk off to prepare for the video. As Chad and Diffy hear screeching, Shannah returns, screaming and claiming the demon is real. In the confusion, Chad fires his shotgun before ordering the group to split up and find Best despite Diffy's concerns. The Hurlisses eventually find Best, who was injured by the shotgun blast. Unable to move him, the Hurlisses leave to find something to carry him with, but hear Best screaming moments later. They return, only to find bloodied pieces of his costume. Fleeing in terror, Shannah trips and discovers Diffy's bloodied jacket. The couple continue running, but Chad falls and breaks his leg. Shannah stays with him until the creature attacks and kills them. The group's blood is found at the scene, but their bodies are never found.

=== Season 3 (2010) ===
No. overall	No. in season	Title	Subject matter	Original release date
25	1	"Zombies"	Zombie	September 28, 2010
In February 2010, New Orleans woman Josephine LeDieux is murdered by Malcolm Clement, whom she had been housing. Due to strange circumstances surrounding the murder, the authorities hire a private security firm, the Enigma Corporation, to find and arrest Clement, who Agent Noel Connor reveals apparently died eight years ago. Accompanied by tactical specialist Elise Mooney and rookie agent Tanner Noble, Connor goes to LeDieux's boarding house, where they believe her other boarders may be harboring Clement, even though it has been condemned. While searching, they discover a voodoo shrine and dismembered human remains. Noble detects movement outside and leaves to investigate, only to be attacked and bitten by a strange girl. Meanwhile, Mooney and Connor are attacked by Clement and the boarding house's zombified residents. The agents manage to restrain Clement and escape the house, but are attacked by a zombified Noble. Following Clement's arrest, the boarding house is demolished, though it is unknown if the residents were inside at the time. Noble is given a quiet funeral, with Connor and Mooney in attendance.
26	2	"Kraken"	Kraken	September 28, 2010
In 2006, two oil rig workers on the Virtanen Deep Sea Oil Platform are attacked by an unidentified creature. The following spring, documentarian James Werner follows treasure hunter Captain Derek Barrow and his crew, Brad Downing, Sasha Porsis, and Ron McCorkle, on an expedition to the Baltic Sea to recover the wreck of a Finnish ship supposedly loaded with Tsarist treasure. Upon arrival, Downing dives underwater, but is attacked and killed by an unseen creature. After hours of zero contact and waiting for Downing to resurface, Porsis mounts a rescue attempt, but is also killed. Barrow and Werner try to find her, but instead locate McCorkle's body on the ship's top deck, his rib cage crushed and covered with a strange ink before they are also attacked by the creature. The following morning, a crew headed for the oil rig find Barrow, who refuses to speak of the incident nor return to the sea. The bodies of Werner and Barrow's crew are never recovered.
27	3	"Strigoi Vampire"	Strigoi	October 5, 2010
In August 2010, the Enigma Corporation is hired to investigate the mysterious deaths of workers at an oil outpost in Silver Rock, New Mexico. Connor and Mooney, accompanied by Doctors Naomi Robeson and Seldon Fischer, find that the workers all died very suddenly. As Fischer takes a blood sample from one of the victims, he finds that most of their blood has been drained. Suddenly, a man claiming to be a worker named Clint Webber emerges, saying the others were victims of a sandstorm. The doctors examine him while the agents check Webber's story. They discover he is not the real Webber and call for backup, but learn the area was quarantined without their knowledge. Meanwhile, “Webber” kills the doctors, takes on Fischer's appearance, and tries to approach the agents, but they get suspicious and he vanishes. “Webber” later attacks Mooney, though she and Connor successfully survive and escape. The workers and doctors' deaths are officially attributed to a gas leak while the company ceases operations in North America. Animal hairs and saliva samples are confiscated by the FBI, and no lab results are released to the public.
28	4	"Poltergeist"	Poltergeist	October 5, 2010
In 2005, the Golden family move into a new home in Lakeview, Colorado, but are plagued by unexplained occurrences surrounding their son, Troy. In 2009, after Troy's sister Megan is nearly killed, the parents hire a paranormal investigation team consisting of parapsychologist Dr. Jeremy Reinhold, Kristy Johns, and Bill "Shots" Cooper, who film the account for their TV show, Paranormal Encounters. After strange occurrences take place while testing Troy, the team send the Goldens away to a relative's house and begin their investigation. In Troy's room, they find a box containing newspaper articles about a man named Charles Weatherly, who lived in the house twenty years prior and murdered his wife and children before killing himself. The group concludes Weatherly became a poltergeist that is haunting the house and vow to remove him. Suddenly, Johns is attacked and killed by an unseen entity that demands they leave. Despite Reinhold's refusal to do so, Cooper tries to leave with Johns' body, but an angered Weatherly eventually kills them both. The investigators' deaths are officially attributed to cardiac arrest, while the episode they filmed never aired. Shortly after, the Goldens sell the home.
29	5	"Devil Monkey"	Devil monkey	October 12, 2010
In 2009, West Virginian reporter Stacie Foster accompanies ATF agents Ollie Moye and Mark West and law enforcement officer Ernest Tybee as they venture into the Appalachian forests to bust an illegal moonshining operation. As it grows dark, the group avoid a rudimentary tripwire-based alarm system, but an unseen creature sets it off. When they return to check, they find a strange footprint that Tybee recognizes as a foreign animal's. They later encounter bloodied and terrified teenager Matt Jones, who was attacked earlier and claims monsters are following him. Ignoring Jones' pleas, the agents continue on until they reach the moonshiners' destroyed camp. They find strange claw marks, fresh blood, dismembered body parts, and one of the moonshiners' mauled corpses before large apes attack and kill them while Jones escapes to tell the authorities. Following a sweep of the camp, they find the previous group's mutilated corpses and identify them through DNA and dental records. A team of zoological experts is assembled to identify the attackers, though they are only able to determine that the creatures are mammals.
30	6	"Yeti"	Yeti	October 12, 2010
In 2005, billionaire explorer Mark Hordstrom goes missing while climbing Mount Everest. Three years later, his body is discovered along with a "major discovery". Two journalists, Jared Slate and Alex Turner, convince Charlie Newhouse, a longshoreman working on the cargo ship carrying Hordstrom's remains and the discovery, to take them aboard so they can break the story first. As they enter the cold storage area, the mauled corpse of one of Newhouse's co-workers falls from the ceiling. Wondering whether they should call the police, Slate notices a broken crate behind them labeled "BIOLOGICAL SPECIMEN". Upon further examination, they realize it was opened from the inside. Newhouse refuses to continue on and begs the journalists to leave with him. Slate agrees, but Turner insists on getting a shot of the discovery before they go. Newhouse attempts to flee, but an unseen animal kills him before it pursues and eventually kills the journalists. The trio’s bodies are never recovered, while their deaths are officially attributed to drowning despite their video proving otherwise. The press conference awaiting Hordstrom's body and the discovery is canceled, while Newhouse's ship is diverted to Plum Island.
31	7	"Wendigo: American Cannibal"	Wendigo	October 19, 2010
In 2009, college students Matthew Gaahl, Lane Corey, April Desoto, and Vince Gabriel are on a spring break camping trip in the Appalachian wilderness, but become lost and struggle to find food. After Desoto is severely injured and Gabriel disappears, Lane finds Gaahl eating an unidentified substance. He later confides in her that something is making him act strangely and suggests leaving on their own, but Corey questions him about what happened to their friends. Gaahl implies they should cannibalize Desoto, disgusting Corey. Later that night, Corey finds a monstrous Gaahl looming over Desoto's body. He sees and chases her until she hides in a cave. Days later, a search party consisting of Porter Voss, Trent Dorsey, and Shelby Nash, is organized to find the students. They eventually find the students' campsite and strange shrines dedicated to them. They also find Corey, but Gaahl, now a full wendigo, eventually kills the rescuers and attacks Corey. A larger search party recover the bodies of Desoto, Gabriel, Voss, Dorsey, and Nash, while Corey and Gaahl are never found. In spite of both of the previous groups' video evidence, the deaths are attributed to black bear attacks.
32	8	"Q: The Serpent God"	Quetzalcoatl	October 26, 2010
In 2008, the Mexico City Police Department hires the Enigma Corporation to investigate a series of ritualistic murders. Connor, Mooney, cult activity expert Dr. Nadja Santo, and Santiago Vargas, an informant with ties to the murderers, are dispatched. They plan to have Vargas make contact with one of the alleged murderers, Lucas Marzo, a local businessman with ties to cult activity. However, despite gaining the location of an abandoned train depot, a terrified Vargas runs off. As the agents and Santo enter a nearby warehouse they believe the cultists are hiding in, Santo discovers a nest and a tourist's body before being captured by the cultists to be sacrificed. The agents try to save her and arrest the cultists, but an explosion disables the lights. The agents find all of the cultists and Santo dead. Seeing a large, snake-like creature in the darkness, they take cover, lure it to the altar, and open fire on it. What the creature was and what happened to it remains unknown, as the Mexican government demolished the depot. Marzo was posthumously convicted of the killings, while the agents escaped with minor injuries.
33	9	"Beast of Bray Road"	Beast of Bray Road	November 2, 2010
In 2009, following an attack by what he believes were federal agents, militia leader Brian Cavanaugh hires investigative reporter Randal Steiner and cameraman Mike Monroe for an exclusive interview at his militia's headquarters deep in Wisconsin's woods. Upon meeting Steiner, Cavanaugh claims the militia are exercising their Second Amendment rights in the hopes of wresting control from big government. When Cavanaugh shows Steiner the mauled body of one of his militiamen from the previous attack, Steiner notes the damage looks more consistent with an animal attack, but Cavanaugh is unconvinced. Suddenly, an unidentified creature attacks the base. Assuming it is a raid, Cavanaugh brings Monroe with him to repel it, telling Steiner to stay back. As several militiamen are killed, Cavanaugh believes Steiner and Monroe are complicit in the attack and returns to the base with Monroe, intending to take the two hostage. However, the creature attacks the trio, killing Cavanaugh and Steiner, while Monroe survives and escapes to a fire road. Two days later, his testimony prompts federal agents to raid the militia base. They discover the bodies of Steiner, Cavanaugh, and the militia members, whose deaths are attributed to wolf attacks, despite the lack of any such evidence.
34	10	"Reptilian"	Reptilian	November 9, 2010
In 2008, a dramatic rise in teenage disappearances in New York City prompts the mayor's office to assemble a task force to investigate. Detectives John Sloan and Rhonda Ramirez are dispatched to follow a lead suggesting secret underground raves are connected. They apprehend Steven "Spike" Mills, a promoter for the raves, and offer him immunity in exchange for leading them to one. Upon arrival, a snake-eyed man marks their hands with symbols that are only visible on night vision cameras. Mills notes Sloan got the "V.I.P. stamp" before the detectives investigate the rave's surrounding area. Noticing a giant lizard tail slither around a corner, Sloan runs ahead to catch the owner, but finds a larder with several teenagers hanging from the ceiling before an unseen figure asphyxiates him. As Ramirez and Mills find the larder, Mills's camera reveals the teens all have the V.I.P. stamp. He flees, but is attacked by a hooded figure. Ramirez finds and rescues Sloan, but several figures capture them. The detectives' and Mills's bodies are never recovered, though their surveillance equipment is confiscated and the task force is disbanded due to "budget cuts". Both the raves and the disappearances continue to occur throughout the country.
