= American Werewolf =

American Werewolf may refer to:

- An American Werewolf in London, a 1981 film directed by John Landis; starring David Naughton, Griffin Dunne and Jenny Agutter
- An American Werewolf in Paris, a 1997 film directed by Anthony Waller; starring Tom Everett Scott and Julie Delpy
- The January 23, 2008 episode of the TV show MonsterQuest
