= Hillbilly Beast of Kentucky =

Urban legend in Kentucky, US

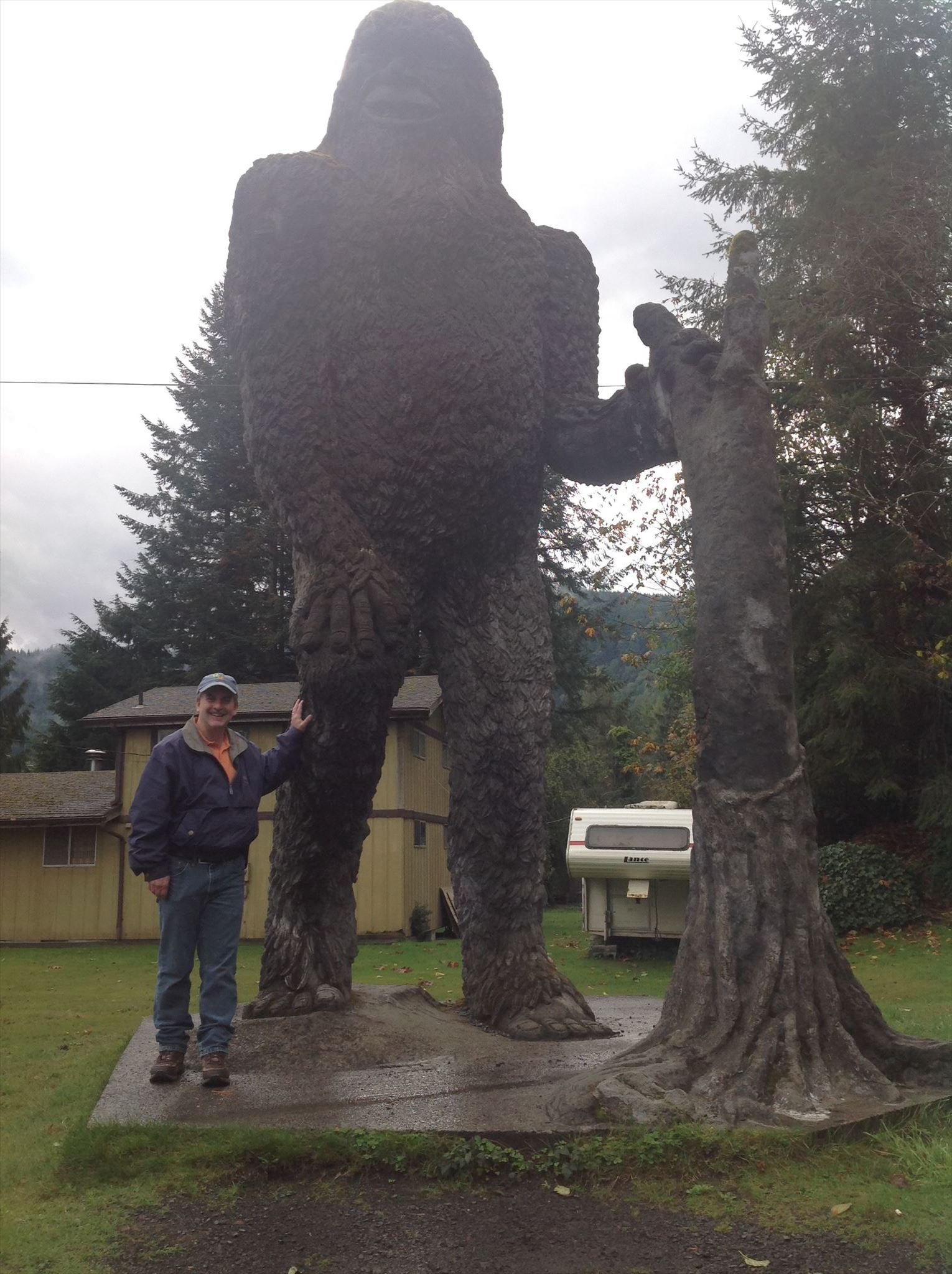
A statue of the Hillbilly Beast

The Hillbilly Beast of Kentucky, also called the Hillbilly Beast, is a Kentucky urban legend similar to Bigfoot that reportedly roams the hills of eastern Kentucky near the Ohio River. The Hillbilly Beast of Kentucky is supposedly 8–10 ft (2.4–3.0 m) tall and weighs over 800 Ib (362.8 kg). The beast reportedly has black eyes that glow orange during the night, vocalizes using shouts, and bangs on trees. It shares the rest of its features with the aforementioned Bigfoot.

== History ==
Daniel Boone told of killing a "ten-foot, hairy giant," which he called a "Yahoo," based on hairy man-like creatures in the book "Gulliver's Travels" written by Jonathan Swift.

== Media ==
The Hillbilly Beast of Kentucky was the focus of MonsterQuest (S4, E2) which came out Jan 20, 2010.
