= Cressie =

Cryptid

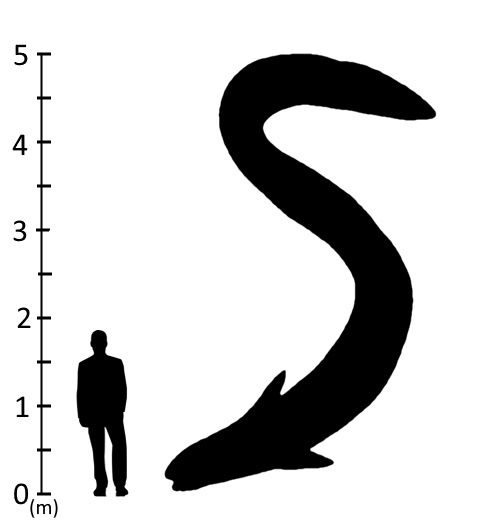

Creature information
- Folklore: Local Legend

Origin
- Country: Canada
- Region: Crescent Lake

In Canadian folklore, Cressie is the nickname given to an eel-like lake monster said to reside in Crescent Lake, Robert's Arm, Newfoundland and Labrador, Canada. The name is a portmanteau of Crescent Lake and Nessie, the nickname given to the Loch Ness Monster. The monster has been described as resembling a large dark brown eel around 15 feet in length with a long, sleek body and as "looking long and shiny, and having a fish-like head." Claims of Cressie being sighted began in the 1950s, and continue to the present day.

== History ==
Though there are reported sightings of Cressie as early as the 1950s, some have linked the legends to earlier Indigenous legends of the woodum haoot ("pond devil") or haoot tuwedyee ("swimming demon"); however, others caution that this attribution has seemingly been copied from source to source without any verification of its connection to Cressie or the area of Newfoundland and Labrador in which Cressie is found.

There have been no photographs of Cressie, and all information relies on local oral history. According to local folklore, an elderly resident of Robert's Arm known as Grandmother Anthony was startled while berry-picking by a giant serpent in the lake. In one of the earliest dated sightings in the 1950s, two woodsmen were on the shores of the lake when they noticed an upturned boat, and fearing for its occupants, they hurried towards it. However, as they approached, the boat turned out to be something large and slick which slipped below the waters of the lake.

A local resident reported a slim, black shape rise five feet from a patch of churning water before sinking out of sight, in early spring 1990.

On July 9, 1991, Fred Parsons and his wife reported seeing a large snakelike creature swimming in Crescent Lake. He described it as a long, sleek body without a significantly large head, which was lying level with the water. In September of that same year, a resident of Robert's Arm was returning to town when he noticed a disturbance on the surface of the lake. As he watched, the object dropped beneath the surface and then rose again. He described it as "a black, fifteen foot long shape pitching forward in a rolling motion much as a whale does but with no sign of a fin." It sank out of sight and did not reappear.

There were several sightings in 1995, and a summer student crew working on the boardwalk along the lake spotted the monster in 2000.

During the summer of 2003, several town residents say they saw the creature swimming after at least a year with no reports, which had led some residents to speculate whether Cressie had died. In these reports, Cressie was said to resemble a snake-like creature with a fish-like head:

A passenger in a passing car shrieked at the driver as she looked out towards the lake and watched as the monster surfaced, its skin shiny and slick under the summer sun. Both watched water pour from the monster's gaping mouth. It was about 20 feet in length and swam silently across the top of the lake before diving down into the cool depths once more.

In the winter, large holes often appear in the ice that covers Crescent Lake, leading some to speculate that the holes were created not by something falling into the lake, but by something bursting through the ice.

== Explanations ==
According to skeptics there are several natural occurrences that can explain "Cressie" sightings. Giant eels have been touted as one of the most likely candidates. Several Robert's Arm residents offer as evidence of the eel hypothesis previous sightings of giant eels, and high numbers of eels appearing in eel traps in the lake. In an article from 1993 called Have You Seen Cressie?, author R.A. Bragg suggests that eels do not stop growing during their lifetime, and perhaps this is the cause of Cressie's size.

Others, such as skeptical investigator Joe Nickell speculate that perhaps the dark-colored northern river otter is responsible. He claims the river otter

"swims both under water and at the surface where its wake can make it appear much longer, and moves in an undulating (rising and falling) manner...In addition, multiple otters swimming in a line can give the effect of a single giant serpentine creature slithering with an up-and-down movement through water".

Still others suggest that Cressie is not a living creature at all, but instead a large log. The bottom of Crescent Lake is reported to be covered in wooden logs from when logging took place in the community. For decades, Crescent Lake was used to transport more than half a million cords of pulpwood that was harvested from the surrounding areas and shipped to paper mills. Some speculate that bubbles of gas from the decomposing wood lift these logs to the surface of the lake.

== Tourism and popular culture ==
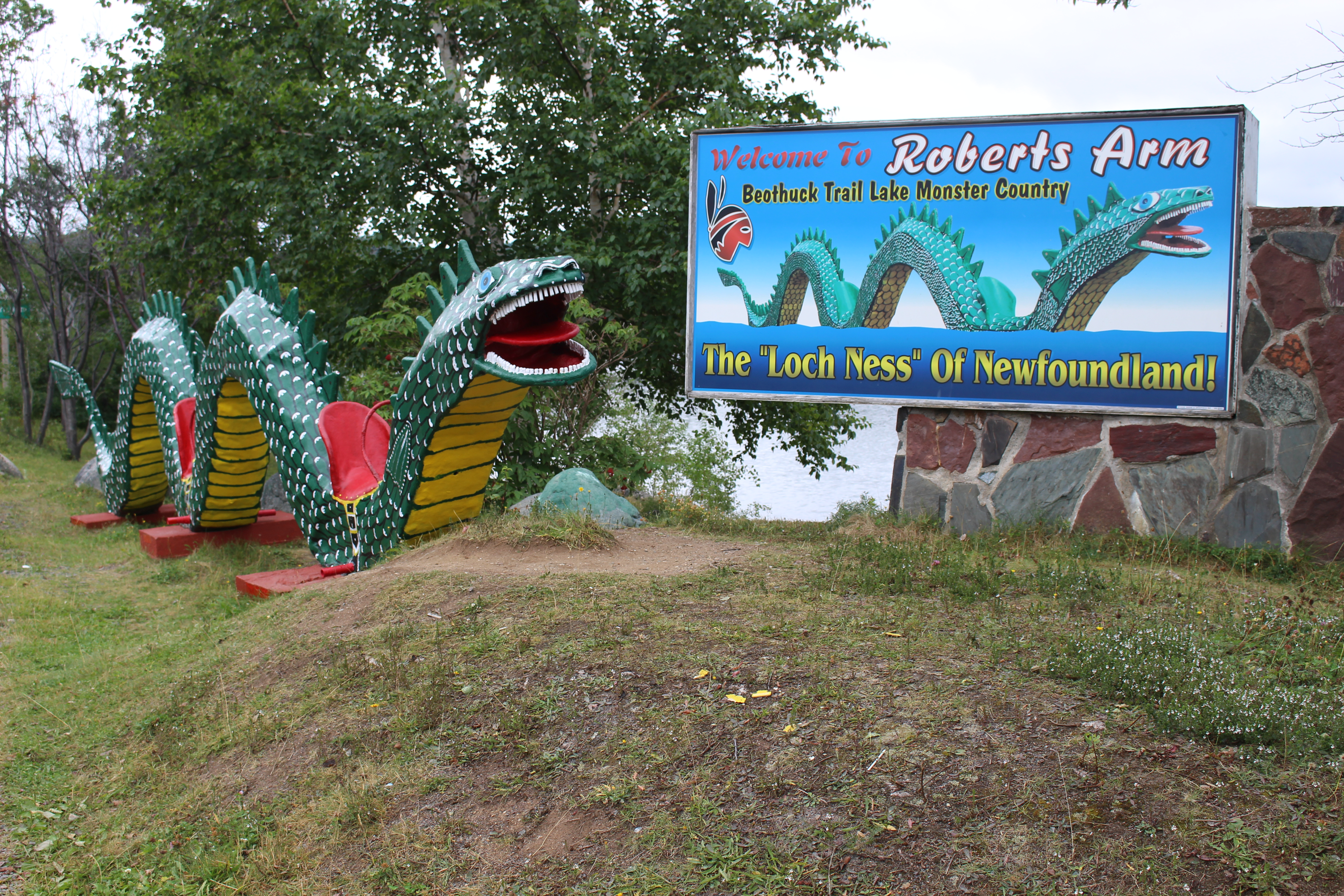
The statue of Cressie, on the shores of Crescent Lake, Robert's Arm, Newfoundland. It is at least the second such statue placed in this location.

In 1991, the town of Robert's Arm erected a statue of Cressie at the entrance to the community, along with a storyboard which describes the alleged sightings. This statue greets tourists to the area, and is depicted with distinctly dragonlike features including green scales, a row of plates along its back, and fearsome teeth. The statue and signs have been part of a deliberate attempt by the community to promote the monster in hopes of boosting tourism and the local economy:

In 1992 Roberts Arm was the principal supply and service centre for communities on several nearby islands. However, the town's major source of employment — cutting pulpwood for local contractors — was in crisis, after having been in decline for some years. It was also hoped that the community would benefit from efforts to promote tourism along the "Beothuk Trail". Perhaps this hope is strengthened by the old, local tradition that a 'monster', named Cressie, inhabits Crescent Lake.

A local gas station is named "Cressie's Gas Bar & Supplies." A 2012 newspaper article promoting local hiking spots used the monster as a potential attraction for hikers:

The area is blazing with color in the fall when the birches, aspens and maples are changing colour. If you are lucky maybe you will even catch a glimpse of 'cressie', the lake monster that lurks beneath the waters of Crescent Lake.

Cressie has featured in several of Robert's Arm's Come Home Year celebrations. The 1995 Come Home Year commemorative book includes several poems which refer to Cressie, including this passage by Jim Payne:

"I suppose you've heard of Cressie the monster in the lake

If you get too handy she'll give her tail a shake

She'll set your boat a-rocking and you won't believe your eyes

And people will make fun of you and say you're telling lies"

In May 2008, local media reported that a production company from Montreal would travel to Robert's Arm to produce a show for the History Channel. On 17 September 2008, History Channel’s Monster Quest broadcast an episode entitled “Lake Monsters of the North,” which focused on the legends of the monster eels in the lake. In October 2019, a group exhibition entitled “Crafted Beasts” opened at the Craft Council of NL Gallery in St. John's, which examined provincial, indigenous, and Western European folklore, and which "started from the desire to see the transformation of traditional beliefs, customs and stories that have been passed through word of mouth, into a physical object." The show included a sculpture inspired by tales of the lake monster:

For “Cressie,” Michael Harlick combined forged metal and found bone to build a spooky sculpture one certainly would not want to encounter in the deep, dark waters.
