= Momo the Monster =

Alleged North American creature

Creature information
- Other names: Mo Mo; Missouri Monster
- Similar entities: Fouke Monster; Honey Island Swamp monster; Skunk ape
- Folklore: Cryptid

Origin
- First attested: 1971
- Country: United States
- Region: Missouri

Momo (Note: Momo is short for the Missouri Monster. The first "Mo" is the abbreviation code for the U.S. state of Missouri (MO), the second "Mo" is the first two letters in the word monster.) is a large, hairy mythical humanoid creature said to have been sighted in rural Missouri. Unlike other areas with similar reports of Bigfoot-like creatures such as the Fouke Monster or Honey Island Swamp monster, Momo did not become a major tourist or economic folklore attraction.

== Description ==
Witnesses have alleged that the creature resembles a human or bipedal ape that stands about 7 ft (2.1 m) tall, although at least one contemporary news report listed notably taller estimates. Purportedly covered in dark hair, it has been described as emitting a putrid odor.

== History ==
On July 11, 1972, two young boys were playing in their backyard on the rural outskirts of Louisiana, Missouri. Their older sister, Doris, was in the kitchen when she heard her brothers screaming. When she looked through the window, she observed a massive, dark-haired, man-like creature holding what appeared to be a deceased dog. She described it as having a "pumpkin-shaped head" and large glowing orange eyes.

Multiple alleged sightings were reported that year, the most notable of which being that of local fire department chief and member of the city council Richard Allan Murray, who described a massive upright creature in his vehicle's headlights while driving along a creek bed. As a result of these purported encounters, a 20-person posse was formed to hunt the creature, though their attempts were unsuccessful.

In 2019, a docudrama horror film titled Momo: The Missouri Monster was released and features a dramatization of the events of 1972. The film's cast includes Cliff Barackman and James "Bobo" Fay, best known for their appearances as members of the Bigfoot Field Researchers Organization (BFRO) on the Animal Planet series Finding Bigfoot.

American theme park Six Flags St. Louis had a ride that operated from 1973 until 1994 named after the creature.

== See also ==
- Bigfoot
- Fouke Monster
- Honey Island Swamp monster
- Skunk ape
