= MonsterQuest =

- Genre: Paranormal
- Narrated by: Stan Bernard
- Country of origin: United States
- Original language: English
- No. of seasons: 5
- No. of episodes: 74

Production
- Executive producer: Dale Bosch
- Producers: Doug Hajicek; Will Yates
- Camera setup: Multiple
- Running time: 45 minutes
- Production company: Whitewolf Entertainment

Original release
- Network: History Channel
- Release: October 31, 2007 – March 24, 2010
- Release: January 2, 2026 – present

Related
- MysteryQuest (2009); In Search of... (1976–82)

MonsterQuest (Note: Sometimes written as Monsterquest or Monster Quest) is an American television series produced by Whitewolf Entertainment for the History Channel, airing from October 31, 2007 to March 24, 2010. The program investigates reports of cryptids and other paranormal phenomena from around the world.

A spin-off series, MysteryQuest, which focused on unsolved mysteries, premiered on September 16, 2009. The History Channel revived MonsterQuest with special episodes beginning on August 28, 2020. Rather than featuring new investigations, these episodes compiled footage from the series' first four seasons.

MonsterQuest returned in 2026, with season 5 premiering on January 2, 2026.

The purpose of the show is described by the narrator, Stan Bernard, in the introduction:

Witnesses around the world report seeing monsters. Are they real or imaginary? Science searches for answers...on MonsterQuest.

== Reception ==
Reception to the series was mixed. Rich Rosell of Digitally Obsessed gave the show a "B−", stating, "The good news is that this isn't a trashy reality show, eager to make everything overblown and sinister. Instead, it takes a seemingly well-researched approach, leaving viewers the opportunity to make up their own minds." He also believed that the "content is certainly nerd-worthy in an I-want-to-believe/Mulder kind of way".

Cinematic Happenings Under Development (CHUD) gave the show a 5.9/10 review, saying that the show is "basically a rehashing of the 1970s/1980s TV show, In Search Of..." and "it leaves you with a sense of either 'been there, done that' or just a feeling of incompleteness because it basically raises as many questions as it tries to answer."

Diablo Cody gave the show high praise in the October 24, 2008 issue of the magazine Entertainment Weekly. She says, "I found a minotaur in that labyrinth of suck: MonsterQuest...on the History Channel."

Academics have noted that media often uncritically disseminates information from the pseudoscience of cryptozoology, including newspapers that repeat false claims made by cryptozoologists or television shows that feature cryptozoologists as monster hunters. Media coverage of purported cryptids often fails to provide more likely explanations, further propagating claims made by cryptozoologists.

== Original cancellation ==
In a statement made March 24, 2010 on the cryptozoological blog CryptoMundo, MonsterQuest producer Doug Hajicek announced that History Channel had canceled the series midway through 4th season. Hajicek said, "The official end of MonsterQuest did not happen because of any lack of topics or for lack of viewers. The Network has decided to go another direction to assure their future as a powerful force in television."

== Episodes ==
=== Series overview ===
Season	Episodes	Originally released	
Season	Episodes	First released	Last released
1	14	October 31, 2007	January 23, 2008
2	20	May 28, 2008	November 12, 2008
3	25	February 4, 2009	October 25, 2009
4	9	January 13, 2010	March 24, 2010
5	8	January 2, 2026	February 13, 2026

=== Season 1 (2007–2008) ===
No. overall	No. in season	Title	Original release date
1	1	"America's Loch Ness Monster"	October 31, 2007
The search for Champ, the monster of Lake Champlain.
2	2	"Sasquatch Attack"	November 7, 2007
An investigation into alleged Bigfoot activity at a remote fishing cabin in Northern Ontario, Canada.
3	3	"Giant Squid Found"	November 14, 2007
A search in the Sea of Cortez for abnormally large Humboldt squids.
4	4	"Birdzilla"	November 21, 2007
A look at the thunderbird mythology and other tales of giant birds in Illinois, Texas, and Alaska.
5	5	"Bigfoot"	November 28, 2007
The continued investigation of Bigfoot in Washington state and a study of the infamous 1967 Patterson–Gimlin film.
6	6	"Mutant Canines"	December 5, 2007
An investigation into reports of attacks on pets and livestock in Maine and Minnesota by unidentified, possible hybrid canines.
7	7	"Lions in the Backyard"	December 12, 2007
A search for unidentified big cats allegedly encroaching into populated areas in Arizona, West Virginia, Pennsylvania, and New York state.
8	8	"Gigantic Killer Fish"	December 19, 2007
The hunt for massive catfish, northern pike and gar responsible for alleged attacks on humans in U.S. freshwater lakes.
9	9	"Swamp Beast"	December 26, 2007
A trek into the swamps of Louisiana and Florida in search of the Bigfoot-like skunk ape.
10	10	"Russia's Killer Apemen"	January 2, 2008
An investigation into dictator Joseph Stalin's plan to create ape-human hybrids and a look into the story of Zana of Tkhina, an alleged Almas.
11	11	"Unidentified Flying Creatures"	January 9, 2008
An investigation into the purported existence of extra-dimensional entities known as Rods.
12	12	"The Real Hobbit"	January 16, 2008
A look at Southeast Asian reports of the Hobbit-like Homo floresiensis and the Orang Pendek.
13	13	"Giganto: The Real King Kong"	January 19, 2008
An investigation into reports of the continued existence of Gigantopithecus, a huge species of extinct ape that inspired the tales of King Kong. Note: According to the credits, this episode was narrated by Edward Herrmann
14	14	"American Werewolf"	January 23, 2008
A trip to Wisconsin and Michigan to investigate supposed werewolf-like creatures, including the Beast of Bray Road and the Michigan Dogman.

=== Season 2 (2008) ===
No. overall	No. in season	Title	Original release date
15	1	"Mega Hog"	May 28, 2008
An investigation into reports of gigantic pigs like Hogzilla.
16	2	"Vampire Beast"	June 4, 2008
A look at the 2007 North Carolina reports of strange attacks on livestock and pets by a creature that feeds on blood and a similar occurrence from the 1950s.
17	3	"Ghosts"	June 11, 2008
An investigation into ghost activity including at the Lizzie Borden murder house and at the sight of the Battle of Gettysburg.
18	4	"Ohio Grassman"	June 18, 2008
An examination into reported sightings of the Bigfoot-like Ohio Grassman.
19	5	"Giant Killer Snakes"	June 25, 2008
A journey into the jungles of Venezuela for man-eating anacondas; and a trip to the Florida Everglades to hunt for massive invasive pythons.
20	6	"Super Rats"	July 2, 2008
A look into evidence that prehistoric rodents grew to enormous size and recent reports of giant rats in New York City.
21	7	"Black Beast of Exmoor"	July 9, 2008
The search for the black panther-like Beast of Exmoor that is allegedly killing livestock in the English countryside.
22	8	"Chupacabra"	July 23, 2008
An investigation of the Chupacabra and Elmendorf Beast, blood-draining creatures purported to be responsible for a rash of unexplained animal killings in Puerto Rico and Texas.
23	9	"Legend of the Hairy Beast"	July 30, 2008
A look into the mythologies of the Native Americans and Bigfoot.
24	10	"Vampires in America"	August 6, 2008
An investigation into vampires that allegedly lived in New England in the 18th century and interviews with modern-day, self-proclaimed vampires in New Orleans.
25	11	"Boneless Horror"	August 13, 2008
A journey into the depths of the Pacific Ocean in search of giant octopus like the Lusca.
26	12	"Bigfoot in New York"	August 20, 2008
A look into the Bigfoot-like Monster of Whitehall, New York.
27	13	"Lake Monsters of the North"	September 17, 2008
The search for Cressie and giant eels in Newfoundland's Crescent Lake.
28	14	"China's Wildman"	September 21, 2008
An investigation into a Chinese government-led search effort for the Yeren, a Bigfoot-like creature supposedly living in the remote Hubei province.
29	15	"Giant Bear Attack"	September 24, 2008
A look into reports of bear attacks and evidence of massive polar bear-grizzly bear hybrids.
30	16	"Giant Squid Ambush"	October 8, 2008
Return investigation to the Sea of Cortez to examine new evidence of massive squids.
31	17	"Monster Spiders"	October 22, 2008
A look into giant spiders including the Solifugae and other massive arachnids that some people claim are large enough to prey on small dogs.
32	18	"Jaws in Illinois"	October 29, 2008
An investigation into reports of bull sharks in the Mississippi River as far north as Illinois, and reports of Greenland sharks killing caribou along the St. Lawrence River seaway.
33	19	"Real Dragons"	November 5, 2008
A look at attacks on humans by the Komodo dragon, and an investigation into reports that the supposedly extinct Megalania may still lurk in Australia's Blue Mountains region.
34	20	"Sasquatch Attack II"	November 12, 2008
A return investigation to the purported Bigfoot activity at a remote fishing cabin in Northern Ontario and a new examination of the DNA evidence from blood stains found by investigators at the scene.

=== Season 3 (2009) ===
No. overall	No. in season	Title	Original release date
35	1	"Death of Loch Ness"	February 4, 2009
A review of researcher Robert Rhines' claim that if the Loch Ness Monster existed, its bones may be at the bottom of the loch.
36	2	"Cattle Killers"	February 11, 2009
An investigation into the unexplained cattle mutilation and killings of other livestock in North America with surgically precise wounds that do not match known predators.
37	3	"Swamp Stalker"	February 18, 2009
A search for the Fouke Monster, a Bigfoot-like creature said to be responsible for violent attacks that inspired the 1972 film, The Legend of Boggy Creek.
38	4	"Devils in New Jersey"	February 25, 2009
A 60-person research team delves into the Pine Barrens of New Jersey in search of the Jersey Devil, a horse-headed, bat-winged creature reportedly haunting the area for the past 250 years.
39	5	"Gators in the Sewers"	March 4, 2009
A look back at a story from the 1930s about a swarm of sewer alligators was found living under New York City, and a delve into the sewer system to see if the creatures could still be lurking there.
40	6	"Snowbeast Slaughter"	March 11, 2009
A hike into the Rocky Mountains in search of a Bigfoot-like creature that local ranchers believe is responsible for killing livestock and elk, and a look at fresh kills near Pikes Peak.
41	7	"Mega Jaws"	March 18, 2009
A search off Mexico's Baja Peninsula for a reported 60-foot shark of possible prehistoric origin that terrified local fisherman call the "Black Demon."
42	8	"Monster Close Encounters"	March 25, 2009
A look at some of the most compelling eyewitness accounts of close encounters with Bigfoot across North America. Witnesses are interviewed and evidence is tested to uncover what people are seeing in the wilderness.
43	9	"Lake Demons"	April 15, 2009
An investigation is launched in British Columbia's Lake Okanagan using the latest underwater technology to search for evidence of lake monster known as Ogopogo.
44	10	"Sea Monsters"	April 22, 2009
A look at legends of sea monsters and examination of video footage that captured an unidentified sea creature in the waters off the Florida coast.
45	11	"Mysterious Ape Island"	April 29, 2009
An expedition is launched on to British Columbia's Vancouver Island in search of a Bigfoot that local native tales say would steal children who ventured too deep into the woods.
46	12	"Gigantic Killer Fish II"	May 6, 2009
A look at an 1895 attack off the coast of Florida by a Goliath grouper and an alleged recent attack. Other attacks in the freshwater lakes of Minnesota by aggressive muskellunge are also explored.
47	13	"Isle of the Lost Tiger"	May 13, 2009
A review of reports from Tasmania that claim a predator once thought to have been hunted to extinction has made a comeback — the thylacine.
48	14	"Killer Jellyfish"	May 27, 2009
A look at the rising concern of venomous jellyfish in New York's Hudson River and on the beaches of Spain.
49	15	"Flying Monsters"	June 3, 2009
A trek into the jungles of Papua New Guinea in search of flying creature local villagers call the "Demon Flyer", whose description is similar to the extinct pterosaur.
50	16	"The Curse of the Monkey Man"	June 10, 2009
An investigation into the reports of attacks by the "Monkey Man", a creature that caused mass-panic around the city of New Delhi, India. Also explored is an expedition into the Garo Hills to look for evidence of the Mande Barung.
51	17	"Killer Crocs"	June 17, 2009
A look at massive and aggressive crocodiles, including the ancient Sarcosuchus imperator. Additionally, a trek into Florida's swamps in search of record-sized American crocodiles.
52	18	"The Last Dinosaur"	June 24, 2009
An expedition into the jungles of Cameroon in search of evidence of the Mokèlé Mbèmbé–a creature local villagers identify as a long-necked sauropod.
53	19	"Critical Evidence"	July 8, 2009
A review of the best evidence for the existence of Bigfoot, including videos, footprints, and comeplling eyewitness accounts gathered from across the U.S.
54	20	"The Real Cujo"	July 22, 2009
An exploration into the rising number of attacks on people by feral dogs. A team of investigators in St. Louis, Missouri track these animals to find out how dangerous they can be.
55	21	"Terror from the Sky"	July 29, 2009
A look back at a series of mid-20th-century reports of bizarre flying humanoids that caused waves of panic in small towns across the northern U.S., and recent alleged encounters in Mexico and California.
56	22	"Killer Chimps in America"	August 12, 2009
A look at the popularity of chimpanzees as exotic pets, as well as chimp attacks from Florida may be evidence that some of these animals have escaped captivity and are surviving in the wild.
57	23	"Tigers in the Suburbs"	August 19, 2009
An investigation into Upstate New York's wilderness in search of what area residents claim are big cats, possibly escaped exotic pets, that are stalking the local deer population.
58	24	"The Real Moby Dick"	August 26, 2009
Following the reports of attacks that inspired the Moby-Dick tale from classic literature, an investigative team searches for albino sperm whales to uncover the truth about their alleged aggressive nature.
59	25	"Abominable Snowman"	October 25, 2009
This 2-hour episode looks into the reports and evidence for the existence of the Yeti, and follows an expedition into the Himalayas. Note: This special was also released as part of History Channel's In Search of History DVD series.

=== Season 4 (2010) ===
No. overall	No. in season	Title	Original release date
60	1	"Monster Sharks"	January 13, 2010
A look at the increasing number of attacks by great white sharks along American beaches. The investigation follows a team of researchers who are trying to determine why sharks are becoming more aggressive.
61	2	"Hillbilly Beast"	January 20, 2010
A trek into the foothills of Kentucky in search of the Bigfoot-like Hillbilly Beast.
62	3	"Giant Pythons in America"	January 27, 2010
Investigators study the adaptability of giant pythons in Florida as their habitat expands into heavily populated areas such as Miami, and if its possible for them to spread across the country.
63	4	"Giant Killer Bees"	February 3, 2010
An examination into when South American scientists accidentally created large, aggressive bees that have been plaguing Mexico and the southern United States and the possibility of their expansion into other parts of North America.
64	5	"Mothman"	February 10, 2010
A look into the 1967 reports of the Mothman–a mysterious winged creature that terrorized Point Pleasant, West Virginia, and was believed by some to be an omen for the collapse of the Silver Bridge that killed 46 people.
65	6	"Piranha Invasion"	March 3, 2010
A look at the growing number of South American piranha that are appearing in U.S. freshwater systems. A team studies how they are adapting, and collects evidence to determine if the predatory fish are becoming a new threat to these environments.
66	7	"Lizard Monster"	March 10, 2010
An investigation into the Flatwoods Monster, a supposed reptilian-like creature that in 1952, allegedly appeared in a strange hovering craft and attacked witnesses with a toxic gas.
67	8	"Sierra Sasquatch"	March 17, 2010
An expedition into California's Sierra Nevada mountains and examining Native American petroglyphs of a supposed family of Bigfoot.
68	9	"America's Wolfman"	March 24, 2010
Investigators head into the wilderness of the Midwestern U.S. in search of a werewolf-like creatures.

=== Season 5 (2026) ===
No. overall	No. in season	Title	Original release date
69	1	"Cops Vs. Cryptids"	January 2, 2026
Explores purported law enforcement officer encounters with cryptids including with a shadow person, the Goatman, Bigfoot, and the werewolf-like Beast of the Land Between the Lakes.
70	2	"Active Duty"	January 9, 2026
Alleged paranormal and cryptid encounters by military members are examined, including with a Jinn during the 2003 Invasion of Iraq, an air traffic controller's experience with a poltergeist, a U.S. Air Force airman's encounter with Bigfoot, and a UFO tracked by P-51 fighter pilots in 1948.
71	3	"Trespassers Beware"	January 17, 2026
Investigates alleged cryptid and paranormal encounters by people venturing into forbidden areas.
72	4	"Hunted"	January 23, 2026
Explores stories of people allegedly stalked by cryptids such as Bigfoot, the skunk ape, and the Wendigo.
73	5	"Grave Mistakes"	January 30, 2026
Explores alleged paranormal encounters with a shadow person, the haunting of the Perron family, the Florida skunk ape harassing a family, and teenagers who summoned an evil entity using a ouija board.
74	6	"Domestic Disturbance"	February 13, 2026
Investigates tales of cryptid and paranormal encounters by people in or near their homes, including the Ohio Grassman destroying a man's backyard, the Bigfoot-like Spottsville Monster stealing chickens and killing dogs in rural Kentucky, the Amityville murders, and the Fouke monster terrorizing rural Arkansas.
75	7	"Monster Hotspots"	February 20, 2026
Explores notorious paranormal locations including Skinwalker Ranch in Utah, Point Pleasant, West Virginia, and the sight of the 1967 Patterson-Gimlin film near Willow Creek, California.
76	8	"Sightings in the Sky"	February 27, 2026
Examines UFO encounters including four men's claims they were abducted by aliens in the Allagash Wilderness Waterway, a mass sighting of a triangular shaped craft in 1950s Alabama, and the Travis Walton incident.

== Home release ==
=== Season 1 ===

Released 2008 contains 14 episodes running approx 600 minutes

- 1. America's Loch Ness Monster
- 2. Sasquatch attack
- 3. Giant Squid Found?
- 4. Birdzilla
- 5. Bigfoot
- 6. Mutant Canines
- 7. Lions in the Backyard
- 8. Gigantic Killer Fish
- 9. Swamp Beast
- 10. Russia's Killer Apemen
- 11. Unidentified Flying Creatures
- 12. The Real Hobbit
- 13. American Werewolf

Note: Due to a production error, "Giganto - The Real King Kong" was not included on the DVD release. It has been listed that an episode titled "Tree Man" appeared on the DVD release as episode 14. But no evidence can be found to support this on any of the worldwide DVD releases.

=== Season 2 ===

Released 2009 contains 20 episodes running approx 900 minutes

- 1. Bigfoot In New York
- 2. Black Beast Of Exmoor
- 3. Boneless Horror
- 4. China's Wildman
- 5. Chupacabra
- 6. Ghosts
- 7. Giant Bear Attack
- 8. Giant Killer Snakes
- 9. Giant Squid Ambush
- 10. Jaws in Illinois
- 11. Lake Monsters of the North
- 12. Legend of the Hairy Beast
- 13. Mega Hog
- 14. Monster Spiders
- 15. Ohio Grassman
- 16. Real Dragons
- 17. Sasquatch Attack 2
- 18. Super Rats
- 19. Vampire Beast
- 20. Vampires in America

=== Season 3 ===

Released 2009 contains 25 episodes running approx 1100 minutes

- 1. Death of Nessie
- 2. Cattle Killers
- 3. Swamp Stalker
- 4. Monster Close Encounters
- 5. Snowbeast Slaughter
- 6. Mega Jaws
- 7. Devils in New Jersey
- 8. Lake Demons
- 9. Gators in the Sewers
- 10. Gigantic Killer Fish 2
- 11. Critical Evidence
- 12. Killer Jellyfish
- 13. The Last Dinosaur
- 14. Flying Monsters
- 15. Sea Monsters
- 16. Mysterious Ape Island
- 17. Terror from the Sky
- 18. Killer Chimps in America
- 19. Tigers in the Suburbs
- 20. Abominable Snowman
- 21. The Real Cujo
- 22. The Real Moby Dick
- 23. Isle of the Lost Tiger
- 24. Curse Of The Monkey Man
- 25. Killer Crocs
- 26. Giant Pythons in America
- 27. Monster Sharks
- 28. Mothman
- 29. Lizard Monster
- 30. Hillbilly Beast
- 31. Sierra Sasquatch
- 32. Piranha Invasion
- 33. America's Wolfman
- 34. Giant Killer Bees

=== Movie Monsters ===
Released 2009 contains 4 episodes running approx 188 minutes

- 1. Jaws in Illinois
- 2. Swamp Stalker
- 3. American Werewolf
- 4. Vampires in America

== See also ==
- Cryptid
- Legend Quest
- Treasure Quest
