= Michigan Dogman =

Alleged creature in Wexford County, Michigan

Creature information
- Other name: Michigan Werewolf
- Similar entities: Beast of Bray Road
- Folklore: Cryptid

Origin
- First attested: 1887
- Country: United States
- Region: Michigan

In folklore, the Michigan Dogman is an alleged creature first witnessed in 1887 in Wexford County, Michigan, United States. It was described as a seven-foot-tall (2.1 m), blue- or amber-eyed bipedal canid possessing the torso of a man with a fearsome howl resembling a human scream. Folklore claims clapping three times will deter the creature and that it reemerges on a recurring ten-year pattern linked to years ending in the number seven. Sightings have been reported in several locations throughout Michigan, primarily in the northwestern quadrant of the Lower Peninsula.

== History ==
This creature was unknown to most of the modern world until very late into the 20th century. It is said to have been stalking the area around the Manistee River since the days when the Odawa tribes lived in the area.

The first alleged encounter with the Michigan Dogman occurred in 1887 in Wexford County, when two lumberjacks reportedly witnessed a creature that they claimed possessed the body of a man with the head of a dog.

In 1937, Robert Fortney was attacked by five wild dogs in Paris, Michigan, and claimed that one member of the pack walked on two legs. Similar creatures were likewise reported in Allegan County in the 1950s, as well as in both Cross Village and Manistee in 1967.

Other purported encounters include a series of sightings in Grand Haven, Ottawa County, from 1993 to 1994. Most of these reports came from a man simply referred to as “Ben”. He claimed to have seen the beast on three occasions. One such sighting was in December 1993, wherein he spotted the Dogman in his parents' driveway on Lakewood Drive. The creature was standing behind the car on its hind legs, only running off when Ben started screaming.

Another report was submitted in 1994 in the same area. In this account, the witness allegedly hit a large animal with his car, assuming it was a deer. There was no corpse to be found, instead only gray fur within the grille of the vehicle.

In her book The Beast of Bray Road, Linda S. Godfrey compares the Manistee sightings to a similar creature attested in Wisconsin known as the Beast of Bray Road.

== The Cook song ==
In 1987, disc jockey Steve Cook at WTCM-FM in Traverse City, Michigan, recorded a song titled "The Legend", which he initially played as an April Fool's Day joke. He based the song on myths and legends from around North America, and had never heard of an actual Michigan "dogman" at the time of the recording:

I made it up completely from my own imagination as an April Fools' prank for the radio and stumbled my way to a legend that goes back all the way to Native American times.

— Steve Cook, Skeptoid.com, Wag the Dogman

Cook maintains his skepticism about the possibility of a real dogman and had this to say about the matter:

I'm tremendously skeptical, because I've sort of seen the way folklore becomes built from the creation of this song to what it's turned into ... but I do believe people who think they saw something really did see something. I also think the Dogman provides them with an avenue to explain what they couldn't explain for themselves.

— Steve Cook, Skeptoid.com, Wag the Dogman

Cook recorded the song with a keyboard backing and credited it to Bob Farley. After he played the song, Cook received calls from listeners who said that they had encountered a similar creature. In the weeks after Cook first played "The Legend", it was notably the most-requested song on the station. He also sold cassettes of the songs for four dollars, and donated proceeds from the single to an animal shelter. Over the years, Cook has received more than 100 reports of the creature's existence. In March 2010, the Dogman and Beast of Bray Road were the focus of an episode of MonsterQuest. In January 2014, the creature was featured in the season 2 episode "Great Lakes: Wolfman, Dogman, Wendigo" of Monsters and Mysteries in America.

Other references to the Dogman include various YouTube channels such as Dogman Encounters Radio, Dogman Narratives, Scary Stories NYC, Campfire Tales, Dogman Encounters with Jeffrey Nadolny, Lilith Dread, Thin Veil, as well as the creator Josh Nanocchio, the host of What Lurks Beneath.

Cook later added verses to the song in 1997 after hearing a report of an unknown canid breaking into a cabin in Luther, Michigan. He re-recorded it again in 2007, with a mandolin backing.

== Feature film ==
In late 2011, filmmaker Rich Brauer released a film called Dogman, starring Larry Joe Campbell. The movie premiered at the State Theater in Traverse City.

The film included a brief segment of "The Gable Film", used with permission from Mike Agrusa, who received acknowledgement in the film credits.

== See also ==
- Beast of Bray Road
- Werewolf
