= White River Monster =

Large creature in Arkansas folklore reportedly spotted by White River near Newport

Creature information
- Sub grouping: River monster
- Similar entities: Elephant seal Florida manatee

Origin
- First attested: 1915
- Country: United States
- Region: Northeast Arkansas
- Habitat: Water

In Arkansas folklore, the White River Monster is a large creature reportedly first spotted off the banks of the White River near Newport in northeastern Arkansas.

Although reported in the press as a "monster", it is reported to be deeply loved by neighborhood residents near this portion of the White River, and the monster is referred to locally as "Whitey".

== History ==
Some believe the White River Monster may have affected the Civil War. The river was used for transportation, and the monster was supposedly responsible for overturning a boat. Sightings of the monster began in 1915. On July 1 of that year, an owner of a plantation near the river saw the monster. He reported it having gray skin and being "as wide as a car and three cars long". As the news spread, construction of a rope net began, but ended due to lack of money and materials.

In the first week of 1937, recreational fishermen observed a noticeable reduction in their expected catch, and the creature was spotted again. The sighting was reported to Bramlett Bateman, a nearby plantation owner. He later confirmed the sighting, describing it as having "the skin of an elephant" and being "four or five feet wide by twelve feet long, with the face of a catfish, . . . lolling on the surface of the water". Feeling it was a threat to his crops, he intended to detonate TNT in the eddy where the creature was spotted, but area authorities denied him necessary permission. A minor media sensation resulted in an influx of visitors from across the nation, some bringing cameras, explosives, and even a machine gun. Ultimately, the sightings ceased, a plan to capture the alleged creature with a giant net had failed, and a deep sea diver failed to locate the creature. In the wake of these unsuccessful attempts to confirm the animal's existence, Bateman was accused of having perpetrated a hoax, despite over 100 confirmed sightings recorded during the period.

The White River Monster was sighted again in the summer of 1971. That year, eyewitnesses who encountered the creature described it as "the size of a boxcar" with a bone protruding from its forehead. One eyewitness claimed, "It looked as if the thing was peeling all over, but it was a smooth type of skin or flesh" and that it made strange noises that sounded like a combination of a "cow's moo and a horse's neigh". Other accounts of the White River Monster described three-toed tracks, 14 inches (360 mm) in length, on Towhead Island leading down to the river through a path of bent trees and crushed bushes.

In 1973, the Arkansas State Legislature signed into law a bill by state Senator Robert Harvey, creating the White River Monster Refuge along the White River. The area is located between "the southern point on the river known as Old Grand Glaize and a northern point on White River known as Rosie". It is illegal to harm the monster inside the refuge.

== Identification ==
Skeptic Joe Nickell has noted that the existence of the creature is not particularly controversial; however, the question as to identifying it with a known species lingers. Biologist Roy Mackal was persuaded that the monster was an elephant seal, but Nickell disagreed with this hypothesis due to the White River being well out of the range of that species. Nickell proposed that the monster(s) were likely Florida manatees, also known as "sea cows". Others have speculated that the source of the legend might have come from the discovery of a 230-pound, eight-foot alligator gar.

== In fiction ==
- Rommel, Keith "White River Monster" Pennsylvania: Sunbury Press, 2015, pp. 22. 3 part short story series. ASIN: B012QGP8GQ
- The White River Monster was featured in the 2009 Lost Tapes episode, "White River Monster".
- The White River Monster features in author J.K. Rowling's writings as a magical creature whose spines are used as wand cores by American wizards.
