= The Beast of Bray Road (film) =

2005 American horror film

- DVD released by The Asylum
- Directed by: Leigh Scott
- Written by: Leigh Scott
- Produced by: David Michael Latt; David Rimawi; Sherri Strain
- Starring: Jeff Denton; Thomas Downey; Sarah Lieving; Joel Ezra Herner; Tom Nagel
- Cinematography: Steven Parker
- Edited by: Leigh Scott
- Music by: Mel Lewis
- Production company: The Asylum
- Distributed by: The Asylum
- Release date: 1 September 2005 (United States)
- Running time: 80 minutes
- Country: United States
- Language: English

The Beast of Bray Road is a 2005 American horror film written and directed by Leigh Scott. A direct-to-video release produced and distributed by The Asylum, it is based on the Beast of Bray Road, a purported wolf-like cryptid that was allegedly first sighted in Elkhorn, Walworth County, Wisconsin, in 1936. It stars Jeff Denton, Thomas Downey, Sarah Lieving, Joel Ezra Hebner, and Tom Nagel.

== Plot ==
Phil Jenkins is the new sheriff of Walworth County, Wisconsin, which he has just transferred to from Chicago. Phil is dating Kelly Jean, the owner of a local tavern called Kelly's Roadhouse, and is assisted in his duties by Deputies Pamela Fitske and Dennis Snarski. When people and animals start turning up dead, all of them viciously ripped apart and eaten, it sparks rumors about the return of the Beast of Bray Road, a mythical, wolf-like creature whose legend dates back to the 19th century. The gossip attracts the attention of Quinn McKenzie, a cryptozoologist who inserts himself into the investigation, to the annoyance of Phil.

As the bodies pile-up, mounting evidence, such as the teeth marks on a victim's bones and DNA analysis of the fur that was found at one of the attack sites, suggests that the predator that is running amok really is a werewolf; this is confirmed by dashcam footage that is recovered from Dennis's car after he is killed by the Beast. Billy Loubes, the best local hunter and the bereaved younger brother of two of the Beast's victims, agrees to allow Phil, Quinn, and Pamela access to his vast arsenal of firearms in exchange for Phil letting him help them hunt the Beast. The quartet coat their bullets in silver (the only substance that can nullify a werewolf's regenerative powers) and brew a serum, described as "the Ebola virus for werewolves" by Quinn, out of nightshade and Wolf's bane.

The Beast wounds Quinn and bites Billy, but before it can finish either of them off, it is shot in the leg by Phil, who pursues it to the Roadhouse. Phil realizes that Kelly is the Beast when he sees her wounded leg; Kelly reveals that she was bitten by another werewolf, implied to be the actual Beast of Bray Road, and explains that, while she initially only transformed during the full moon, she eventually mastered the change, though she admits that, lately, she has "lost control of it." Kelly partially transforms and bites Phil, who injects her with Quinn's serum, forcing her back into her human form while he regroups with Pamela. To buy time while the serum wears off, Kelly tricks Pamela into shooting Phil, then kills Pamela. Phil is saved by his bulletproof vest, and as Kelly fully transforms, a pair of motorists pull up to the Roadhouse. While Kelly is distracted murdering the men, a recovered Billy sets her on fire before he and Phil finish her off by shooting her, with Billy snarking, "Silver bullets, bitch."

The film ends with Phil and Billy, now cursed with lycanthropy, temporarily sequestering themselves in the mountains after being supplied with more of the anti-werewolf serum by Quinn.

== Cast ==
- Jeff Denton as Sheriff Phil Jenkins
- Thomas Downey as Quinn McKenzie
- Sarah Lieving as Kelly Jean
- Joel Ezra Hebner as Creature/Ray Loubes
- Tom Nagel as Billy Loubes
- Noel Thurman as Deputy Pamela Fitske
- Matt Kawczynski as Deputy Dennis Snarski
- Dan Tana as Zeke Loubes
- George Williams as Father Rogers
- Bernadette Pérez as Gina Germaine
- Anne Apra as Mrs. Van Beek
- Kyle Kaplan as Jeff Van Beek
- Mark Womack as Timmy
- Christina Rosenberg as Sandy Brown
- Maija Polsley as June Brown
- Heather Conforto as Gretchin Willings
- Megan Bass-Jackson as Sheila
- Amanda Barton as Shelly Berka
- Steven C. Miller as Brad Willson/Bar Patron
- Eliza Swenson as Tami
- Andrew Lauer as Jack Berka
- Kean Cronin as George Krantz
- William Clevinger as Victor
- Kurt Altschwager as Leon Barton
- Jill McGrady as Margaret Lewis
- Jennifer Black as Dyana Stacy
- Hutchi Hancock as Maddy Mann
- Derek Riley as Pat McGuire
- Ben Thompson as Ben Slawner
- Melanie Guzek as Bar Patron

== Reception ==
Steve Anderson of Film Threat responded positively to the film, writing, "You know, overall, there's not a whole lot wrong with The Beast of Bray Road. This isn't one of those special, spectacular ones that I can recommend over and over again, but I tell you, if you're into monster movies, especially werewolf pictures, then The Beast of Bray Road is going to be right up your alley." In a review written for Rue Morgue, Joseph O'Brien had a middling response to the film, deriding its derivative plot and "dumb" characters while praising its special effects, ultimately concluding, "While it's unlikely to make you forget Ginger Snaps anytime soon, once you get past the fact that the events depicted in The Beast of Bray Road have as much to do with reality as professional wrestling, there's a decent, if uninspired, lupine time-waster here." Bryan Senn, author of The Werewolf Filmography: 300+ Movies, criticized the film's cast, direction, lighting, sound recording, and creature design, but also called it an "unpretentious, mildly entertaining monster movie" that "stands as one of the better films to emerge from the low-budget fringe-film factory known as The Asylum. Admittedly, coming from the company most famous for derivative schlock like Supercroc and Mega Piranha, not to mention the ludicrous-but-entertaining Sharknado series, that's not saying a whole lot."

Felix Vasquez Jr. of Cinema Crazed lambasted the film, writing, "Even when The Asylum isn't ripping off another movie, they still suck. Beast of Bray Road could have been a fun movie had they actually had creature action and not so much utter stupidity and poor storytelling." Jon Condit of Dread Central awarded the film a score of 1½ out of 5 and wrote, "After getting off to a promising start and unveiling one of the best looking werewolf costumes to come along in quite awhile, it pains me to report that the Beast of Bray Road is a total misfire. After about a half hour, it became apparent that Beast of Bray Road was conceived by someone with no imagination that instead chose [to] craft the film using a predictable, by-the-numbers werewolf movie template and insisted on following it to the bitter end. Even a clichéd film can be done with some flare but outside of the werewolf kills, which are surprisingly well executed and certainly gruesome enough to satisfy gore fans, the film is utterly devoid of creativity."
