= MysteryQuest =

- Genre: Paranormal
- Narrated by: Stan Bernard
- Country of origin: United States
- Original language: English
- No. of seasons: 1
- No. of episodes: 10

Production
- Running time: 45 minutes
- Production company: KPI Productions

Original release
- Network: History Channel
- Release: September 16 – December 9, 2009

Related
- MonsterQuest (2007–2010)

MysteryQuest is an American paranormal television series that premiered on September 16, 2009, on History Channel. Produced by KPI Productions, the program is a spin-off of MonsterQuest. The series tagline is "What if everything you believe is wrong?"

== Overview ==
The purpose of the show is best described by the narrator in the introduction:

Throughout time, there have been mysteries mankind cannot explain. But advances in technology have led to new theories, and the search is underway for evidence that may unlock the most baffling questions of our time... on MysteryQuest.

The series examines various persistent mysteries (dubbed "case files") around the world, following teams of investigators who travel abroad to collect and examine evidence and study both popularly accepted explanations and alternate viewpoints regarding a particular case file.

== Reviews ==
"MysteryQuest delivers on its promise to attempt to unlock new answers to unsolved mysteries." ~ Season one DVD review, Zach Freeman, TV Rage

"...it sometimes seems like the writers go into a particular mystery with a preconceived idea of what happened and only look at evidence that supports that idea." ~ Common Sense Media

== Notable case findings ==
The first episode, "Hitler's Escape", documents a forensic investigation of an occipital bone fragment in the Russian state archives claimed by that country to belong to Adolf Hitler. The University of Connecticut's Nick Bellantoni conducted a visual examination that implied the fragment came from someone 20 and 40 years of age, while DNA testing of small fragments of the skull by Bellantoni's colleagues Linda Strausbaugh, Craig O'Connor, and Heather Nelson revealed that it belonged to a woman. The Russian state archive's deputy director denied that the probe had been allowed, although it was filmed and shown on the episode.

In "Rise of the Fourth Reich", investigators uncovered documentary evidence that the organization called ODESSA was known to authorities well before being "exposed" by Nazi hunter Simon Wiesenthal.

In "Jack the Ripper", forensic handwriting analysis expert Michelle Dresbold and psychological profiling expert Brent Turvey identified "quack" medicine purveyor Francis Tumblety as the most likely identity of the infamous serial killer.

== Episodes ==
No.	Title	Original release date
1	"Hitler's Escape"	September 16, 2009
The episode examines the mystery of whether or not Adolf Hitler really committed suicide as Allied Forces invaded Berlin, or managed to escape the country since no body was ever produced. Forensic investigators examine an alleged piece of Hitler's skull provided by the Russians to determine if it really belongs to the dictator.
2	"Devil's Triangle"	September 23, 2009
The episode examines the mysteries of the Bermuda Triangle to find out what could be disorienting airplane pilots, such as a theory that solar energy combined with thunderstorms will create an "electronic fog", and to search near the Bahamas for the wreckage of the first reported aircraft to go missing.
3	"San Francisco Slaughter"	September 30, 2009
Using the latest forensic technology, investigators reexamine evidence that could possibly lay to rest the identity of the infamous Zodiac Killer, whose murder spree terrorized the residents and baffled the police in the San Francisco Bay Area of the 1960s.
4	"The Lost City of Atlantis"	October 7, 2009
Using the latest in sonar and underwater exploration technology, investigators dive to various submerged ruins, including Bimini Road in the Bahamas, with the hope that one of them could possibly be the remains of the legendary city of Atlantis.
5	"Alien Cover-Up"	October 14, 2009
Shadowed by military security, investigators trek into the Nevada desert and use the latest in surveillance technology to monitor supposed UFO activity at the most classified U.S. government installation, Area 51.
6	"Rise of the Fourth Reich"	October 21, 2009
Investigators look into reports of Nazi SS personnel, such as Josef Mengele and Martin Bormann, who are believed to have escaped justice after World War II through the help of a secret organization known as ODESSA and sympathetic members of the Catholic Church. They reportedly fled to Paraguay, where they plotted to reestablish their sinister regime.
7	"Devil's Island"	November 4, 2009
A look at the history of Alcatraz Island which is located in the middle of San Francisco Bay and once a federal prison which opened in 1934. It was deemed inescapable, but in 1962 three inmates managed to escape from the island; they were never seen or heard from again. Investigators try to determine if the men could have survived the frigid waters and made it to freedom.
8	"Jack the Ripper"	November 11, 2009
Over a century ago, London was terrorized by one of the most famous, and earliest documented serial killers, Jack the Ripper, who slaughtered prostitutes in the Whitechapel district. Unsolved to this day, authorities dismissed the killer as a local madman, but investigators are now looking into surprising new evidence that theorizes the killer could possibly have been a woman, or not English, but an American.
9	"Stonehenge"	December 2, 2009
A team is sent to investigate Stonehenge – the mysterious ring of standing stones in Wiltshire, England – to test a new theory that sound reverberation was used to induce trance-like states among the ancient worshipers who used the stones for religious and sacrificial rituals.
10	"Return of the Amityville Horror"	December 9, 2009
A look back at the most famous paranormal case in US history, The Amityville Horror – the demonic haunting of a Long Island home which inspired numerous books, documentaries and films. The series follows paranormal investigators through two other locations in California, both purportedly haunted by similar phenomena.

== Broadcast airings ==
Repeats of the series have aired on the digital broadcast network Quest.
