= Beast of Bray Road =

Alleged North American creature

Creature information
- Other name(s): Bray Road Beast; Wisconsin Werewolf
- Similar entities: Rougarou, Michigan Dogman, Beast of Gévaudan
- Folklore: Cryptid

Origin
- First attested: 1936
- Country: United States
- Region: Wisconsin

The Beast of Bray Road is the name given to a wolf-like creature reported to have been witnessed in or near Elkhorn, Walworth County, Wisconsin. The creature has become a part of Wisconsin folklore and has been the subject of multiple books, documentaries, and a 2005 horror film.

Named for the rural farm road on which it was first purportedly sighted, reports of the creature in the 1980s and 1990s prompted a local newspaper, the Walworth County Week, to assign reporter Linda Godfrey to cover the story. Godfrey was initially skeptical, but later became convinced of the sincerity of many witnesses. Her series of articles later became a book titled The Beast of Bray Road: Tailing Wisconsin's Werewolf. Skeptics maintain that the creature is likely the result of misidentification of known animals, most likely gray wolves.

== Description ==
The Beast of Bray Road is often described by alleged witnesses as being between 6 feet (1.8 m) and 7 feet (2.1 m) tall, with a humanoid style body, covered in fur or hair, and with a head resembling a wolf and large, glowing red or orange eyes. It is purported to have been seen moving as both a quadruped and a biped, and some reports describe it more closely to resembling a traditional werewolf or Bigfoot.

== History ==
The creature was allegedly first sighted on two consecutive nights in 1936 on the grounds of St. Coletta School for Exceptional Children in rural Jefferson, where a night watchman witnessed it digging on an Indian burial mound located on the property. In the 1980s, several alleged witnesses reported the beast had made contact with their vehicles, leaving long scratch marks on doors and trunks of vehicles. One witness stated she hit something while crossing Bray Road. The witness claimed that, upon exiting her vehicle to determine what she had hit, a large wolf-like creature with red eyes chased her back into her car, leaving claw marks in the rear passenger door. Sightings also have been reported during daylight hours, with several witnesses stating they observed an unusually large wolf-like creature running on all fours through corn fields. One stated the creature was in pursuit of a deer.

Animal mutilations have also been reported in the area around Bray Road with animal remains, including deer and livestock, partially eaten with specific organs removed from the animal carcasses. Another witness reported driving down Bray Road late one night and observed an unusually large wolf-like creature eating an animal which had been hit by a car on the side of the road. The creature reportedly ran into the woods as the eyewitness approached it in their vehicle.

In February 2018 and July 2020, alleged witnesses reported observing a large, hair covered upright creature in Spring Prairie and Lyons; both in Walworth County.

== Proposed explanations ==
A number of misidentified animal-based theories have been proposed including that the creature is simply a gray wolf or a large dog such as a Great Pyrenees or Newfoundland. While not common in the southern part of the state, wolves are occasionally found in Walworth County and nearby areas.

It is also possible that hoaxes and mass hysteria have caused some falsehoods and sightings of normal creatures to all be artificially placed under the same label. Others have theorized that the creature may be an American black bear suffering from mange. Like wolves, black bears have been sighted in Walworth County.

== Popular culture ==
- The creature was featured as the primary antagonist in the 2005 film The Beast of Bray Road, a horror film produced and distributed by The Asylum.
- The creature was the subject of the 2018 documentary film The Bray Road Beast, produced by Small Town Monsters, an indie production company documenting unusual events throughout America.
- The creature has been featured in episodes of MonsterQuest (2008), Lost Tapes (2008), Legend Hunter (2019), Haunted Highway (2012), America's Urban Legends (2016), Hexen Arcane (2020), Slammarang! (2014), In Search of Monsters (2019) and on Expedition X (2021)
- The creature was featured in the film The Beast of Bray Road, touted as a "horror comedy," released on March 27, 2025.
