= Honey Island Swamp monster =

Cryptid in Louisiana folklore

Creature information
- Other names: Cajun Sasquatch; Cajun French: La Bête Noire; Louisiana Wookiee
- Similar entities: Bigfoot; Skunk ape; Fouke Monster
- Folklore: Cryptid

Origin
- First attested: 1963
- Country: United States
- Region: Louisiana

The Honey Island Swamp monster is a large, hairy cryptid said to inhabit the Honey Island Swamp in St. Tammany Parish, Louisiana. It has become a part of Louisiana folklore, with many swamp tour companies in the area capitalizing on its purported existence, which is considered unlikely by scientists.

== Description ==
The alleged creature is commonly described by witnesses as a 7-foot-tall (2.1 m), bipedal humanoid with yellow or red eyes, a putrid odor, and a body covered in gray hair. Alleged plaster casts of footprints said to be from the creature showcase four toes; a trait not found in primates.

Claims of its existence are generally met with skepticism, including by scientists familiar with the area like ecologist Paul Wagner. Neither he, his wife Sue, nor their Cajun guide, Robbie Charbonnet, have reported encountering any evidence throughout their time managing swamp tours in the area, and according to skeptic Joe Nickell, are reportedly "ambivalent about the supposed swamp monster’s existence".

== History ==
The first claimed sighting was in 1963 by Harlan Ford, a retired air traffic controller who had taken up wildlife photography. After his death in 1980, a reel of Super 8 film showing the creature was found among his belongings.

In 1974, Ford and his friend Billy Mills claimed to have found unusual footprints in the area, as well as the body of a wild boar whose throat had been gashed.

Today, the creature is still purported to inhabit the swamp and the bayous along the Pearl River. Local lore offers its own potential explanation, that of an early 20th century train crash wherein a traveling circus lost its chimpanzees, who later adapted to the surrounding environment.

== Popular culture ==
- The Honey Island Swamp monster was the subject of The Secret Saturdays episode "Ghost in the Machine", with its vocal effects provided by Dee Bradley Baker. The animated monster resembled a Bigfoot-like creature with crab-like claws and crocodilian feet.
- The creature was featured in an episode of Lost Tapes, "Swamp Creature."
- The alleged animal was also the focus of an episode of In Search of..., "The Swamp Monster."
- The Honey Island Swamp monster was one of the two main subjects of an episode of Fact or Faked: Paranormal Files, "Bayou Beast/River Ghost", which included Ford's original film. The investigators were able to recreate a likeness of Ford's footage with a man dressed in a camouflage ghillie suit used by hunters. They deduced the film could simply be mistaken identity on Ford's part, but didn't rule out that such a creature could exist.
- An episode of Swamp People, "Full Moon Fever," includes a segment in which a group of people, Harlan Ford's granddaughter among them, searches for the monster.
- The creature was featured in a segment of the series Monsters and Mysteries in America, "The Swamp". Alleged Super 8 footage of the monster was also shown.
- The Honey Island Swamp monster was featured in a 2012 episode of Mysteries at the Museum.
- On July 20, 2013, Mattel introduced the Monster High character Honey Swamp as the daughter of the Honey Island Swamp monster at the 2013 San Diego Comic-Con.
- In 2019, an episode of America Unearthed titled "Bigfoot in the Bayou" investigated possible sightings. Presenter Scott Wolter concluded that the smell attributed to the creature was most likely methane produced by decomposing plants.
- Eoin Colfer drew inspiration from the Honey Island Swamp monster for the character Vern in his novel Highfire.
- A version of the Honey Island Swamp monster is included in the role-playing game supplement GURPS Monsters.
- The Honey Island Swamp Monster is featured in the video game South of Midnight. It is depicted as a gentle golem made of leaves, vines, and branches. The main character, Hazel, encounters Honey on her way through an abandoned settlement that used to house plantation slave refugees. Hazel later finds out that he was once a baby of a slave woman named Ayotunde who escaped her captors by jumping out of a paddle boat and running into a swamp. She eventually hid Honey in an old tree, where he was magically transformed into the monster he is now. Meanwhile, Ayotunde searched endlessly for Honey, believing she had lost him in the swamp. It is there where she is turned into a siren-like creature known as Altamaha-ha and kills the paddle boat's crew, all while continually searching for her missing child.

== See also ==
- Bigfoot
- Fouke Monster
- Lake Worth Monster
- Lizard Man of Scape Ore Swamp
- Rougarou
- Skunk ape
