= Lost Tapes =

American fictional found footage television series

- Genre: Found footage Horror; Thriller; Paranormal
- Narrated by: Rick Robles
- Theme music composer: Devin Powers
- Country of origin: United States
- Original language: English
- No. of seasons: 3
- No. of episodes: 34 (list of episodes)

Production
- Running time: Approx. 22 minutes
- Production company: Go Go Luckey Entertainment

Original release
- Network: Animal Planet
- Release: October 30, 2008 – November 9, 2010

Lost Tapes is an American fiction television series that aired on Animal Planet. Produced by Go Go Luckey Entertainment, the program presents reenacted found footage depicting traumatic encounters with creatures cryptozoological, supernatural, mythological or extraterrestrial. Creatures featured include Bigfoot, the chupacabra, vampires, werewolves, and reptilians.

The pilot ("Chupacabra") aired on Animal Planet on October 30, 2008, for Halloween, but the series officially premiered on January 6, 2009. Animal Planet commissioned a second season, which premiered on September 29, 2009. Season 3 premiered on September 28, 2010, with episodes featuring creatures such as zombies and the Kraken. The show also used to air on Planet Green.

== Overview ==
Lost Tapes depicts traumatic scenarios where people are attacked and/or killed by mysterious, dangerous, deadly, wild, and ferocious paranormal cryptids. The series is shot in a documentary style. Most episodes begin with a quick introduction of facts, which include interviews with experts explaining scientific theories or facts and folklore behind the episode's titular creature. In the second season, some episodes began with footage of a person being violently attacked and often killed by the episode's creature, an introduction meant to set up the events of each episode. In the third season, every episode had such an introduction. The events of every episode in all three seasons are accompanied by videos of scientists, cryptozoologists, and folklorists giving their thoughts and opinions of the creatures, which are called Lost Tapes: Revelations.

== Episodes ==
Season	Episodes	Originally released	
Season	Episodes	First released	Last released
1	14	October 30, 2008	February 17, 2009
2	10	September 29, 2009	November 24, 2009
3	10	September 28, 2010	November 9, 2010

== Critical reception ==
Lost Tapes has received mixed reviews from critics. In a review of the season one DVD, TV Squad writer John Scott Lewinski gave the series a mostly unfavorable review, stating that in the case of this series, "Animal Planet could be accused of repacking a horror/sci-fi show as an animal documentary" and that much of the program is "outright bollocks." He did, however, state that the show holds some appeal for audiences looking for a scare, or "incredibly gullible people." Emily Ashby of Common Sense Media gave the series three out of five stars, noting that while the acting was "subpar", the show overall was "simultaneously scintillating and bone-chilling."
