= Fouke Monster =

Creature of Arkansas folklore

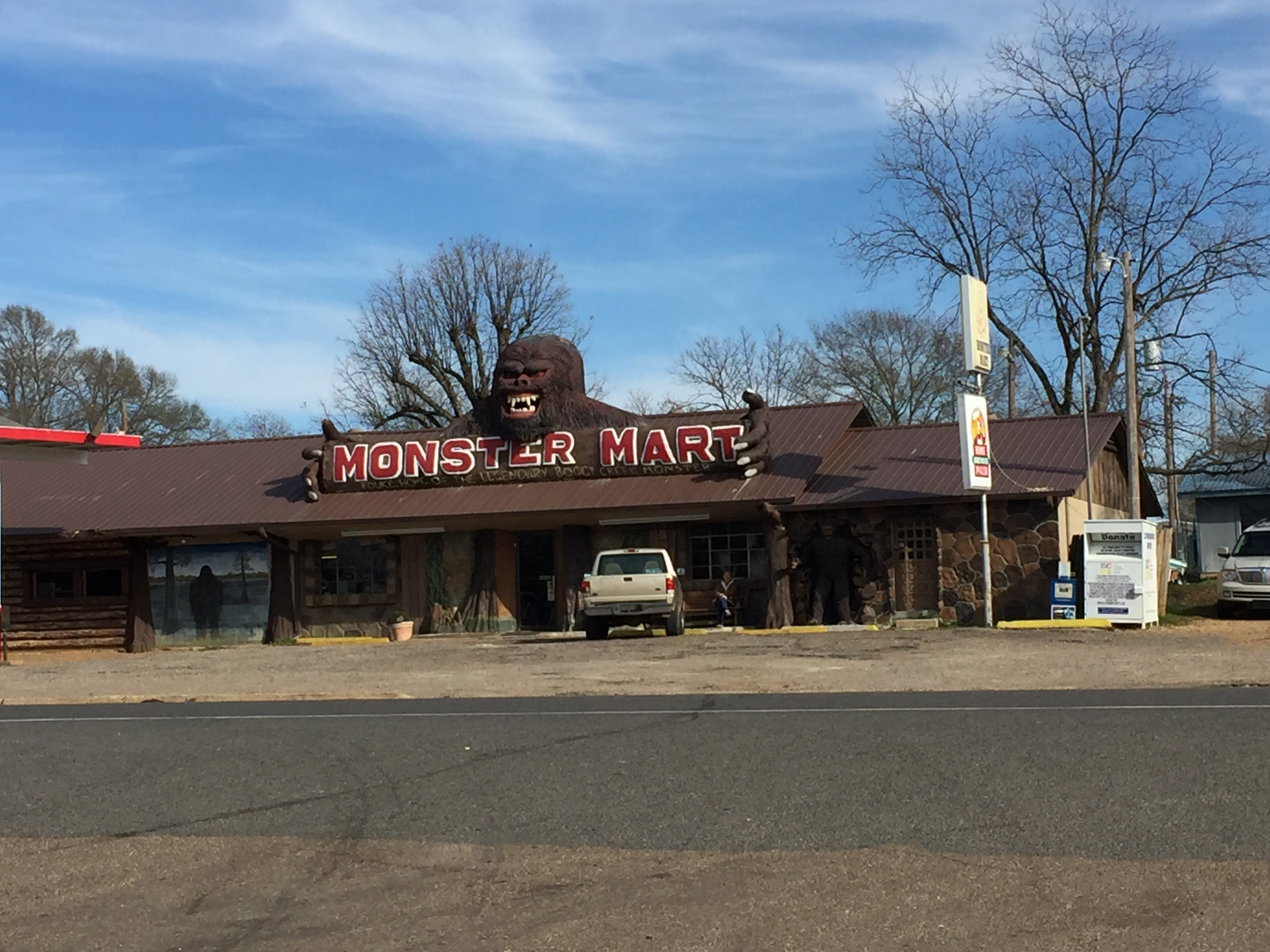
- The Monster Mart souvenir shop and convenience store in Fouke, AR, named for the creature and local folklore

Creature information
- Other names: Boggy Creek Monster; Swamp Stalker; Jonesville Monster
- Similar entities: Honey Island Swamp monster; Skunk ape
- Folklore: Cryptid

Origin
- First attested: 1946
- Country: United States
- Region: Arkansas

The Fouke Monster /ˈfaʊk/ is a large, hairy mythical humanoid creature said to have been sighted in the rural town of Fouke and the area of Miller County, Arkansas, during the early 1970s. Similar to descriptions of Bigfoot, the creature was alleged to have attacked a local family. It has since become a part of Arkansas folklore. Stories of the creature influenced the 1972 docudrama horror film The Legend of Boggy Creek, which became the 11th highest-grossing film of 1972 and is today considered to be a cult classic.

The creature was named by journalist Jim Powell, who reported on it for the Texarkana Gazette and the Texarkana Daily News.

== Description ==
Various reports between 1971 and 1974 described it as being a large, bipedal creature covered in long dark hair. It was estimated to be about 7 feet (2 m) tall with a weight of 250–300 pounds (110–140 kg). Later reports claimed that it was far larger, with one witness describing it as 10 feet (3 m) tall, with an estimated weight of 800 pounds (360 kg). Some accounts describe the Fouke Monster as running swiftly with a galloping gait and swinging its arms in a fashion similar to a monkey. Reports also describe it as having a terrible odor, the odor being described as a combination of a skunk and a wet dog, and as having bright red eyes about the size of silver dollars. (Note: Silver dollar coins minted in the United States in the late 19th and early 20th centuries are 1.5 inches (38.1 mm) in diameter.)

A variety of tracks and claw marks have been discovered which are claimed to belong to the creature. One set of footprints reportedly measured 17 inches (43 cm) in length and 7 inches (18 cm) wide, while another appeared to show feet that only possessed three toes.

== History ==
Prior to the 20th century, several alleged sightings in the general area related to a large, hairy creature circulated in an 1851 report in the Memphis Enquirer, and an 1856 report in the Caddo Gazette.

Local residents claim that the creature had roamed the area since 1964, but those sightings had not been reported. Local folklore also holds that the creature can be further traced back to sightings in 1946. Most early sightings were allegedly in the region of Jonesville as the creature was known as the "Jonesville Monster" during this period.

In 1955, the creature was allegedly spotted by a 14-year-old boy who described it as having reddish brown hair, sniffing the air, and not reacting when it was fired upon with birdshot. Investigator Joe Nickell observed that the description was consistent with a misidentified black bear (Ursus americanus).

=== 1970s ===
The Fouke Monster first made local headlines in 1971, when it was reported to have attacked the home of Bobby and Elizabeth Ford on May 2, 1971.

According to Elizabeth Ford, the creature, which she initially thought was a bear, reached through a screen window that night while she was sleeping on a couch. It was chased away by her husband and his brother Don. During the alleged encounter, the Fords fired several gun shots at the creature and believed that they had hit it, though no traces of blood were found. An extensive search of the area failed to locate the creature, but three-toed footprints were found close to the house, as well as scratch marks on the porch and damage to a window and the house's siding. According to the Fords, they had heard something moving around outside late at night several nights prior but, having lived in the house for less than a week, had never encountered the creature before.

The creature was allegedly sighted again on May 23, 1971, when three people, D. C. Woods, Jr., Wilma Woods, and Mrs. R. H. Sedgass, reported seeing an ape-like creature crossing U.S. Highway 71. More sightings reports were made over the following months by local residents and tourists, who found additional footprints. The best known footprints were found in a soybean field belonging to local filling station owner Scott Keith. They were scrutinized by game warden Carl Galyon, who was unable to confirm their authenticity. Like the Ford prints, they appeared to indicate that the creature had only three toes.

The incident began to attract substantial interest after news spread about the Ford sighting. The Little Rock, Arkansas, radio station KAAY posted a $1,090 bounty on the creature. Several attempts were made to track the creature with dogs, but they were unable to follow its scent. When hunters began to take interest in the Fouke Monster, Miller County Sheriff Leslie Greer was forced to put a temporary "no guns" policy in place in order to preserve public safety. In 1971, three people were fined $59 each "for filing a fraudulent monster report."

After an initial surge of attention, public interest in the creature decreased until it gained national recognition in 1973 when Charles B. Pierce released a docudrama horror film about the creature in 1972, The Legend of Boggy Creek.

By late 1974, interest had waned again and sightings all but stopped; only to begin again in March 1978 when tracks were reportedly found by two brothers prospecting in Russellville, Arkansas. There were also sightings in Center Ridge, Arkansas. On June 26 of that same year, a sighting was reported in Crossett, Arkansas. During this period the creature was blamed for missing livestock and attacks on several dogs.

Since the initial clusters of sightings during the 1970s, there have been sporadic reports of the creature. In 1991, the creature was reportedly seen jumping from a bridge. There were forty reported sightings in 1997 and, in 1998, the creature was reportedly sighted in a dry creek bed 5 miles (8 km) south of Fouke.

== Investigation ==
One month after the Ford sighting, Southern State College (now known as Southern Arkansas University) archaeologist Frank Schambach determined that "There is a 99 percent chance the tracks are a hoax."

According to Schambach, the tracks could not be from a species of ape, as claimed by witnesses, because they were from a three-toed creature, whereas all primates, including hominids, have five toes. In addition to the number of toes, Schambach cited several other anomalies as part of his conclusion: the region had no history of primate activity, ruling out the possibility of the creature being the remnants of an indigenous species; all apes are completely diurnal, as the Fouke Monster was reported to be nocturnal.

By 1986, the mayor of Fouke, Virgil Roberts, and former Miller County Sheriff Leslie Greer, were of the opinion that the alleged Fouke Monster tracks were man-made. Greer's working colleague at that time, Chief Deputy H. L. Phillips, said that he had not taken calls regarding the monster in years. He does not believe the creature exists, stating, "...I don't believe in it. But I'd say you don't argue with people who say they've seen it. Many were respectable and responsible folks".

The Skeptoid podcast concludes "So in total, every last shred of evidence that the Fouke Monster exists at all is anecdotal. Not a single piece is testable. The Fouke Monster fits very poorly with the model of a living animal, but fits very well with a local legend."

== Festival ==
Since 2013, the Fouke Monster Festival, previously called the Boggy Creek Festival, has been an annual event dedicated to discussions, presentations, and lore related to the creature and other similar monsters. Proceeds benefit the Fouke School District, with over $3,000 having been raised in 2019.

== Films ==
=== The Legend of Boggy Creek (1972) ===
The story of Bobby Ford's encounter with the Fouke Monster was the subject of a 1972, docudrama horror film, The Legend of Boggy Creek (initially titled Tracking the Fouke Monster), which played in movie and drive-in theaters around the country. It was written by Earl E. Smith and directed by Charles B. Pierce. The part of Bobby Ford was played by Glenn Carruth and the part of Elizabeth Ford was played by Bunny Dees. Willie E. Smith, on whose land three-toed footprints were found, starred as himself. Many characters were named after the people who played them. Much of the film was shot on location in Fouke and nearby Texarkana, though some scenes also were filmed in Shreveport, Louisiana. Most of the cast were local people or Texarkana college students. The film is believed to have cost $160,000 to make. It grossed $20 million at the box office.

=== Return to Boggy Creek (1977) ===
A second Fouke Monster film, Return to Boggy Creek, was filmed and released in 1977. The movie had an entirely fictional plot and was not intended to be a sequel. It was directed by Tom Moore, written by John David Woody, and starred Dawn Wells as the mother of three children who become lost in the swamp. Some of the film's scenes were shot on location in Dallas, Texas, and Loreauville and Iberia Parish, Louisiana.

=== Boggy Creek II: And The Legend Continues (1985) ===
Originally titled The Barbaric Beast of Boggy Creek, Part II, the third Fouke Monster film was written as a sequel to the original film. Charles B. Pierce wrote, directed, and played the role of Brian Lockart, a University of Arkansas professor who leads a group of students into the swamps around Fouke. The film was shot on location in Fouke but included some scenes shot at the University of Arkansas.

In 1999, Boggy Creek II: And The Legend Continues was lampooned in an episode of Mystery Science Theater 3000.

=== Boggy Creek: The Legend Is True (2010) ===
Boggy Creek: The Legend Is True was released to home video in 2011. Early buzz suggested that the film, directed by Brian T. Jaynes, was to be a remake of Charles B. Pierce's original 1972 film. However, it is an unrelated story set in the fictional town of Boggy Creek, Texas. Even so, the film obviously draws influence from Pierce's film with its small-town setting and use of spooky swampscapes for this Southern Sasquatch horror slasher.

=== The Legacy of Boggy Creek (2011) ===
This low-budget indie film was originally released in 2009 under the title The Skunkape Story, but was later re-edited and released to home video in 2011 as The Legacy of Boggy Creek. The docudrama chronicles the events that began after the original attacks in Fouke. It was written and directed by Dustin Ferguson.

=== Boggy Creek Monster (2016) ===
In 2016, a documentary film about the Fouke Monster entitled Boggy Creek Monster was released. Directed by Seth Breedlove, who co-produced the film with Lyle Blackburn under the banner of Breedlove's production company Small Town Monsters, it was filmed in Fouke and features accounts from claimed eyewitnesses of the purported creature.

== See also ==
- Honey Island Swamp monster
- Momo the Monster
- Skunk ape
- Peter C. Byrne
