= Skunk ape =

Southeastern United States cryptid

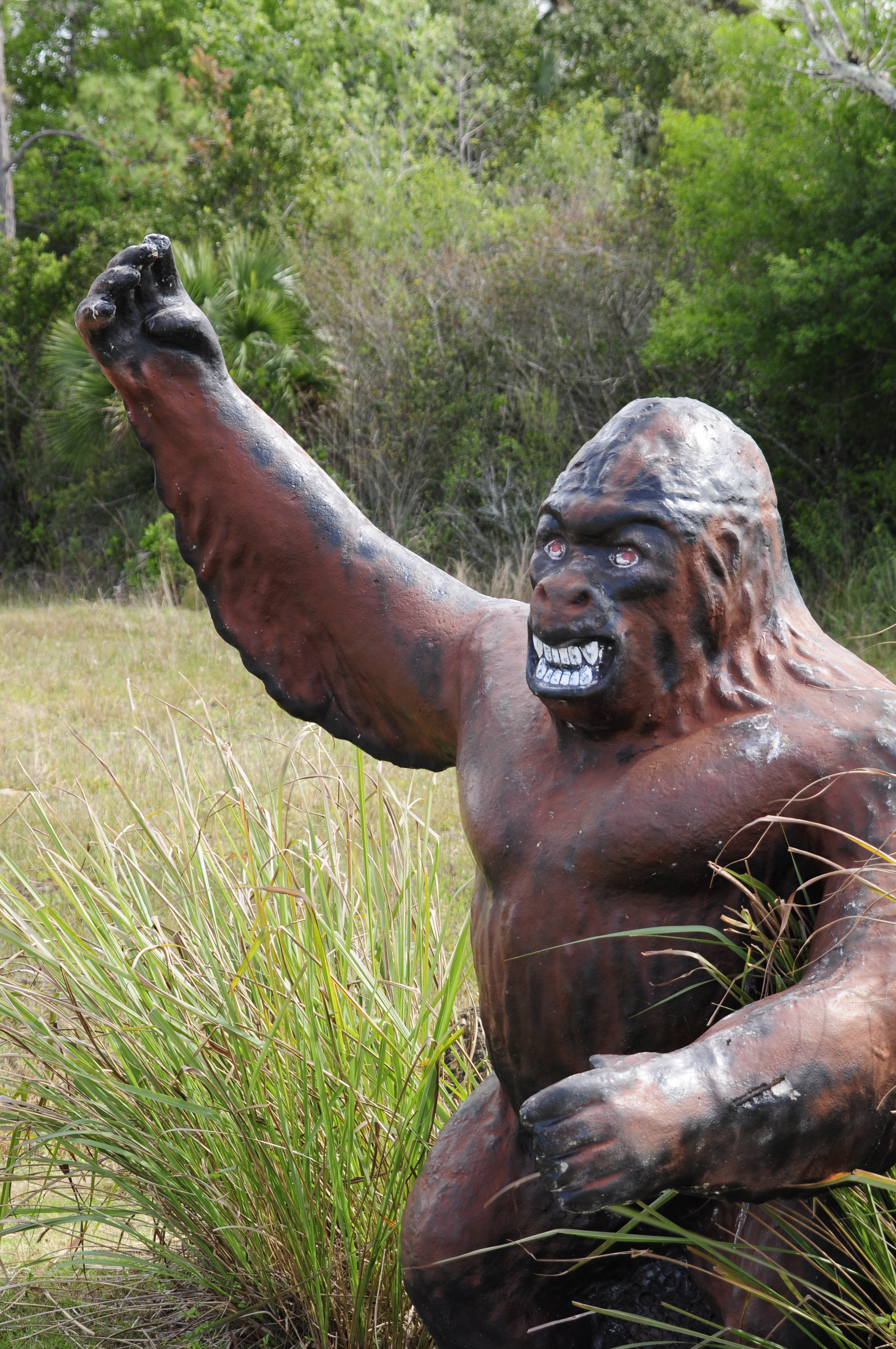
- Statue of the skunk ape

Creature information
- Other names: Florida Bigfoot; Swamp ape
- Similar entities: Bigfoot; Honey Island Swamp Monster; Fouke Monster
- Folklore: Cryptid

Origin
- Country: United States
- Region: Southeastern United States

The skunk ape is a large, hairy mythical humanoid creature said to inhabit forests and swamps in the southeastern United States, most notably in Florida. It is often compared to, synonymous with, or called the "cousin" of Bigfoot, a prominent subject within popular culture.

Many dubious articles have been presented in an attempt to prove the skunk ape's existence, including anecdotal sightings, supposed photographs, audio and video recordings, and casts of large footprints. The majority of mainstream scientists have historically discounted the existence of the skunk ape, considering it to be the result of a combination of folklore, misidentification, and hoax, rather than a living animal. The skunk ape has entered the popular culture of the southern United States, especially in Florida.

== Description ==
The skunk ape is commonly described as a bipedal human or ape-like creature, approximately 1.5–2.1 m (5–7 feet) tall, and covered in mottled reddish-brown hair. The skunk ape is often reported to be smaller in stature compared to traditional descriptions of Bigfoot from the northern United States and Canada. It is named for its foul odor, often described as being similar to that of a skunk.

== History ==
Contemporary descriptions of the skunk ape in Florida, Georgia, and Alabama folklore have occurred since European settlers first occupied the region. In 1818, local newspapers reported a story from what is now Apalachicola, Florida, that spoke of a "man-sized monkey" raiding food stores and stalking fishermen along the shore. Cryptozoologists have made unsubstantiated claims that Seminole and Miccosukee culture includes stories of a foul-smelling, physically powerful, and secretive creature called Esti Capcaki, a name which roughly translates to "Furry Tall Man" or "Hairy Giant".

== Notable alleged sightings ==
Reports of the skunk ape were particularly common in the 1950s through the 1970s. The Bigfoot Field Researchers Organization has archived hundreds of alleged sightings across almost every county of Florida, beginning in 1955 into the present day.

In 1929, an alleged sighting occurred at the famous and then recently constructed Perky Bat Tower at the Florida Keys. Witnesses reported that an unknown ape-like creature was drawn to the construction site. After inspecting the bat tower shortly after it had been stocked with bats, the creature shook the tower, driving off the bats before running off into the woods.

In the small community of Bardin, in Putnam County, Florida, beginning in the 1940s, there were a number of alleged sightings of a creature that came to be known as the Bardin Booger.

In 1942, a man in Suwanee County reported a similar creature rushing out from the brush line while he was driving down an isolated road. It was alleged to have grabbed onto his vehicle and beat on the running board and door for half a mile before departing.

In the 1960s, a rash of sightings in central Florida happened around Alachua County and Marion County. One such report from 1963 involved several members of a family encountering an ape-like creature around their rural home, including one instance of it approaching a window to peer inside at night.

In the 1970s, two Palm Beach County sheriff's deputies named Marvin Lewis and Ernie Milner reported that an ape-like creature stalked them through a grove before they shot at it with their firearms. They reported following a trail of footprints where they recovered hair snagged on a barbed wire fence line that had been pushed down.

From 1971 to 1975, a rash of sightings occurred in Broward County and surrounding areas. Multiple eyewitnesses reported nocturnal encounters with a 5 to 7 foot (1.5–2.1 meter) ape-like creature with dark red to black fur. These events were heavily covered in newspapers, both local and in other Florida cities such as Miami, and were some of the earliest instances popularizing the term "Skunk Ape" in the state lexicon. Reports alleged that the skunk ape had invaded homes, stalked people, and killed several of a farmer's livestock including a horse and a bull. The local police department investigated after one law enforcement officer reported striking the skunk ape with his car. Posses were formed in an effort to locate the alleged creature, but no body or evidence was found.

In 1977, a failed-to-pass bill was proposed to the Florida state legislature to make it illegal to "take, possess, harm or molest anthropoids or humanoid animals".

Several Everglades wildlife tour bus operators and their guests have reported alleged sightings. In July 1997, one such operator, David Shealy, reported wildlife bait stands laden with lima bean had been raided and he noticed strange tracks surrounding them. He baited several locations with more lima beans and multiple witnesses reported skunk ape sightings soon after. Shealy and others attributed this instance to high seasonal flooding having driven numerous animals into tighter ranges around higher ground. One such sighting was by Everglades tour operators Steve Goodbread and Dow Rowland; some of their guests reported skunk ape sightings as well. Both operators claimed that 38 °C (100 °F) weather, high humidity, and the rural location would make a hoax unlikely.

In 1997, a photograph of a dark upright figure in the swamp was taken by Ochopee Fire Control District Chief Vince Doerr that he claims depicts a skunk ape. He reported observing the creature cross the road, and stopped his car to capture a photograph. Within two weeks, over fifty people reported alleged sightings of a hairy creature within the Big Cypress National Preserve.

In the year 2000, the Sarasota County Sheriff's Office received two anonymous photos depicting a large, hairy, ape-like creature. The author of the letter claimed to be an elderly woman who reported the creature had been stealing apples from her back porch near I-75, and upon surprising it with a camera she was afraid it was an escaped orangutan that might harm her family.

Sightings continue to the present day, with forty-eight out of sixty-seven counties in Florida reporting sightings since 2010.

== Proposed explanations ==
Most anecdotal reports and alleged visual evidence are deemed to be fabrication or hoaxes. Skeptical investigator Joe Nickell has written that some of the reports may represent sightings of the Florida black bear, possibly some suffering from mange, and it is likely that other sightings are hoaxes or general misidentification of wildlife. The United States National Park Service considers the skunk ape to be a hoax.

== In popular culture ==
The skunk ape has been widely adopted across Florida as an unofficial mascot for wilderness and rural culture, including appearing in roadside businesses and attractions, television commercials, and on signs. During the onset of the COVID-19 pandemic, Orlando's Gatorland park used the skunk ape's reported foul smell to promote social distancing.

The skunk ape is often the subject of conferences that host guest speakers, research presentations, trail running events, and vendors.

== See also ==
- Fouke Monster
- Honey Island Swamp monster

== Sources ==
- Desjarlais, Jacob (September 15, 2020). The Florida Skunk Ape: A Complete History (Conspiracy Chapbooks Book 1). self-published.
