= Biscardi =

Biscardi is an Italian surname. Notable people with this surname include:

- Aldo Biscardi (1930–2017), Italian football broadcaster, best known for presenting the show Il processo di Biscardi
- Chester Biscardi (born 1948; nicknamed Chet), Italian American composer and educator
- Luigi Biscardi (1928–2019), Italian politician
- Tom Biscardi (born 1948), cryptozoology enthusiast, Las Vegas promoter, internet radio host, and film producer

== See also ==
- Il processo di Biscardi, Italian television program
