= Portlock =

Portlock is a surname. Notable people with the surname include:

- Jenice Dena Portlock (born 1987), also known as Sabi, is an American pop singer, songwriter, dancer and actress
- Joseph Ellison Portlock (1794–1864), British geologist and soldier
- Nathaniel Portlock (c. 1748–1817), British ship’s captain, maritime fur traderand author

== See also ==
- Portlock, Alaska, is a ghost town in the U.S. state of Alaska
