= Bigfoot trap =

Trap designed to capture Bigfoot, an alleged North American creature

Coordinates: 42.05394°N 123.14566°W

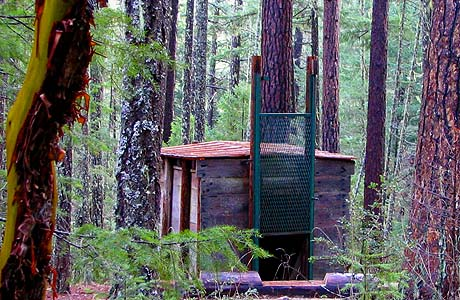
Bigfoot trap - February 2007

The Bigfoot trap is located in the Rogue River–Siskiyou National Forest in the southern part of Jackson County, Oregon, 3.1 miles (5.0 km) from the California border. Believed to be the only one of its kind, the trap was designed in 1974 to capture Bigfoot, a purported ape-like creature said to live in the forests of the Pacific Northwest. It failed to accomplish this, and was abandoned in the early 1980s.

Today, the trap is maintained as a novelty by the United States Forest Service as it sits along the Collings Mountain hiking trail and sees hundreds of visitors annually.

== Description ==
The trap is a wooden box 10 by 10 feet (3 by 3 m) made of 2x12 planks bound together by heavy metal bands and secured to the ground by telephone poles. A U.S. Forest Service special use permit was issued for its construction. The trap's door has been bolted open since 1980 for visitor safety. Its location was originally remote, but since the construction of the Applegate Dam, a road is now near the trap.

== History ==
The trap was built in 1974 by the North American Wildlife Research Team (NAWRT), a now-defunct organization based in Eugene, Oregon, that was inspired to build a trap at the location by Perry Lovell, a miner who lived near the Applegate River. Lovell had claimed to have found 18-inch-long (46 cm) human-like tracks in his garden. The trap was designed to activate a metal door to prevent escape when the bait, suspended from the ceiling, was pulled. NAWRT operated the trap, keeping it baited with carcasses for six years, but caught only bears.

The Bigfoot trap was abandoned and began to deteriorate. The U.S. Forest Service, under the "Passport in Time" program, began to repair the trap in 2006.

The trap has become a tourist attraction, and hundreds of people visit it annually. At least one film has been shot on site.

== See also ==
- Bigfoot
- Bigfoot in popular culture

== Bibliography ==
- Place, Marian (1974). On the Track of Bigfoot (See also 3 photos after page 96.). Dodd, Mead. pp. 144–46. ISBN 0-396-06883-9.
