= Bigfoot =

Mythical creature

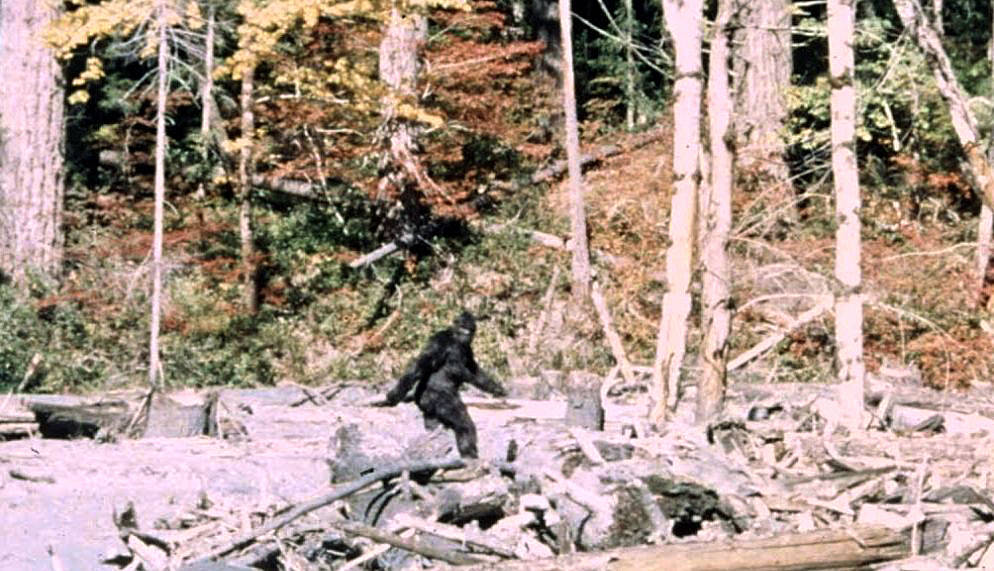
- Frame 352 of the 1967 Patterson–Gimlin film, claimed by the filmmakers to depict a female Bigfoot

Creature information
- Other name(s): Sasquatch; Squatch (Note: Linguistic truncation of the word "Sasquatch"); Other names

Origin
- Country: Canada; United States
- Region: North America

Bigfoot, (Note: /ˈbɪɡfʊt/) or Sasquatch, (Note: /ˈsæskwɒtʃ/ SAS-kwotch, /ˈsɒskwɒtʃ/ SAHS-kwotch, or /ˈsæskwætʃ/ SAS-kwatch) is a large, hairy, mythical humanoid creature said to inhabit forests in North America, particularly in the Pacific Northwest. Bigfoot is featured in both American and Canadian folklore, and since the mid-20th century has become a cultural icon, permeating popular culture and becoming the subject of its own distinct subculture.

Enthusiasts of Bigfoot, such as those within the pseudoscience of cryptozoology, have offered various forms of dubious evidence to support Bigfoot's existence, including anecdotal claims of sightings as well as supposed photographs, video and audio recordings, hair samples, and casts of large footprints. However, the evidence is a combination of folklore, misidentification, and hoax, and the creature is dismissed by scientists as not a real living animal.

Folklorists trace the phenomenon of Bigfoot to a combination of factors and sources, including the European wild man figure, folk tales, and indigenous cultures. Examples of similar folk tales of wild, hair-covered humanoids exist throughout the world, such as the skunk ape of the southeastern United States, the Almas, Yeren, and Yeti in Asia, the Australian Yowie, and creatures in the mythologies of indigenous people. Wishful thinking, a cultural increase in environmental concerns, and overall societal awareness of the subject have been cited as additional factors.

== Description ==
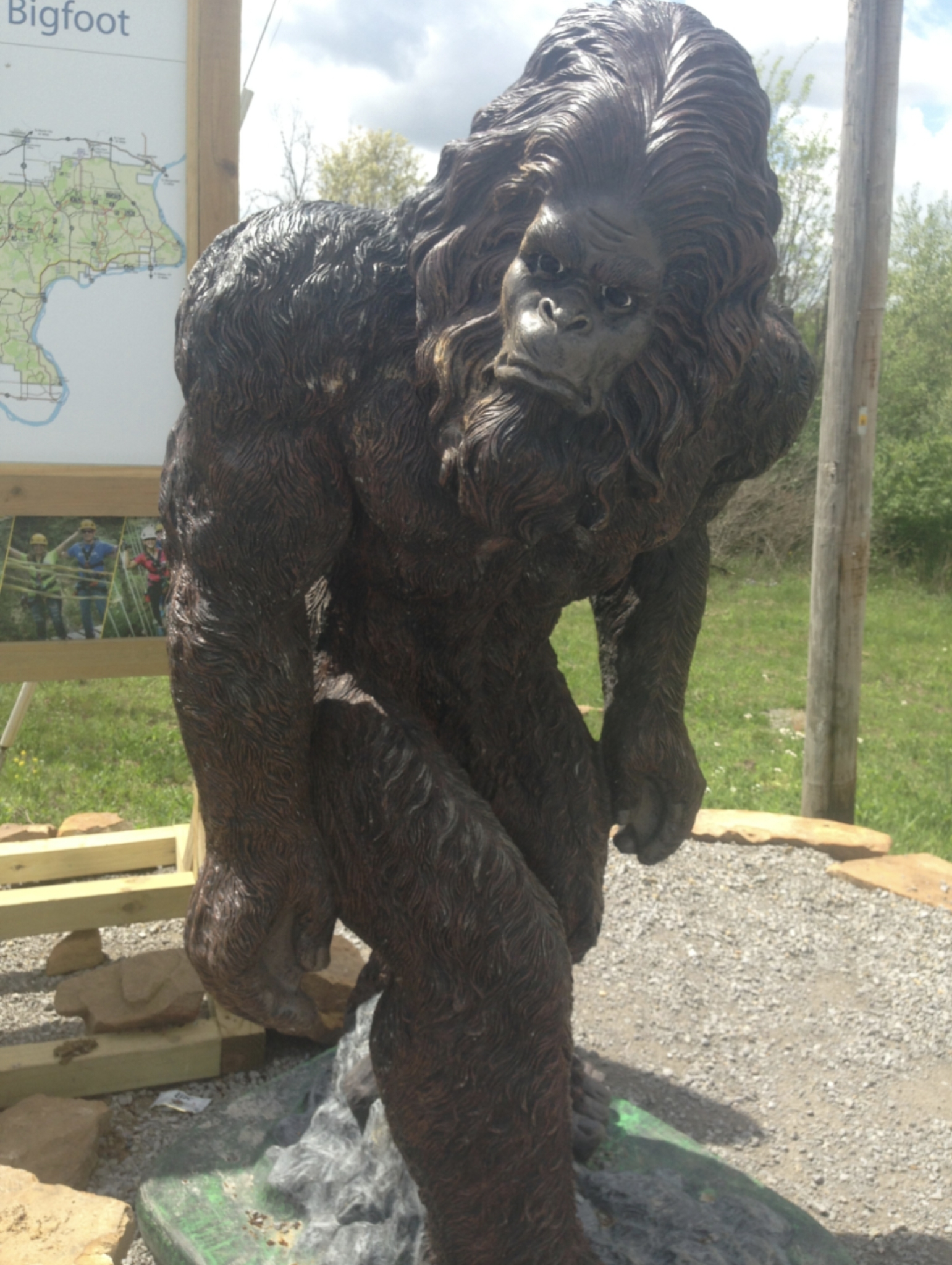
"Sassy the Sasquatch" roadside attraction statue in the Garden of the Gods Wilderness within the Shawnee National Forest, Illinois

Bigfoot is often described as a large, muscular, and bipedal human or ape-like creature covered in black, dark brown, or dark reddish hair. Anecdotal descriptions estimate a height of roughly 6–9 feet (1.8–2.7 m), with some descriptions having the creatures standing as tall as 10–15 feet (3.0–4.6 m). Some alleged observations describe Bigfoot as more human than ape, particularly in regard to the face. In 1971, multiple people in The Dalles, Oregon, filed a police report describing an "overgrown ape", and one of the men claimed to have sighted the creature in the scope of his rifle but could not bring himself to shoot it because "it looked more human than animal".

Common descriptions include broad shoulders, no visible neck, and long arms, which many skeptics attribute to misidentification of a bear standing upright. Some alleged nighttime sightings have stated the creature's eyes "glowed" yellow or red. However, eyeshine is not present in humans or any other known great apes, and so proposed explanations for elevated observable eyeshine in the forest include owls, raccoons, or opossums perched in foliage, or bears standing upright.

Michael Rugg, the owner of the Bigfoot Discovery Museum, claims to have smelled Bigfoot, stating, "Imagine a skunk that had rolled around in dead animals and had hung around the garbage pits."

The enormous footprints for which the creature is named are claimed to be as large as 24 inches (610 mm) long and 8 inches (200 mm) wide. Some footprint casts have also contained claw marks, making it likely that they came from known animals such as bears, which have five toes and claws.

== Etymology and other names ==
=== Sasquatch ===
In 1929, Indian agent and teacher J.W. Burns, who lived and worked with the Sts'ailes Nation (then called the Chehalis First Nation), published a collection of stories titled, Introducing B.C.'s Hairy Giants: A collection of strange tales about British Columbia's wild men as told by those who say they have seen them, in the 1 April issue of Maclean's magazine. The stories offered various anecdotal reports of wild people, including an encounter a tribal member had with a hairy wild woman who could speak the language of the Douglas First Nation. Burns coined the term Sasquatch, believed to be the anglicized version of sasq'ets (sas-kets), roughly translating to "hairy man" in the Halq'emeylem language. Burns describes the Sasquatch as "a tribe of hairy people whom they claim have always lived in the mountains—‌in tunnels and caves".

=== Bigfoot ===
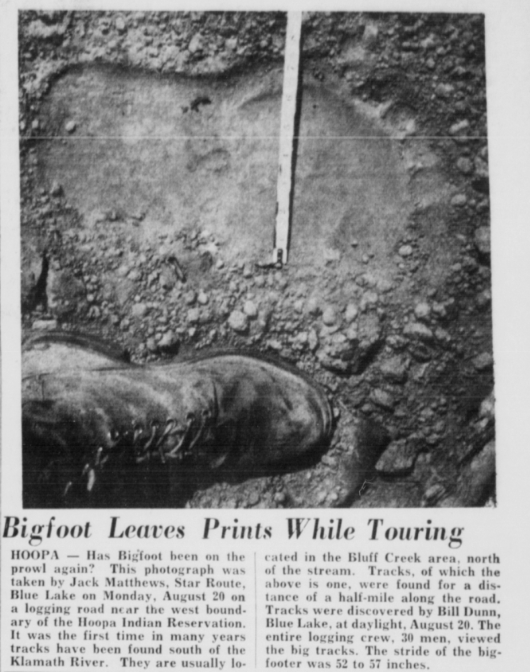
Photograph of an alleged Bigfoot footprint taken in Hoopa, California in September 1962 and featured in a Humboldt Times newspaper article.

In 1958, Jerry Crew, bulldozer operator for a logging company in Humboldt County, California, discovered a set of large, 16-inch (410 mm) human-like footprints sunk deep within the mud in the Six Rivers National Forest. Upon informing his coworkers, many claimed to have seen similar tracks on previous job sites as well as telling of odd incidents such as an oil drum weighing 450 pounds (200 kg) having been moved without explanation. The logging company men soon began using the word "Bigfoot" to describe the apparent culprit. Crew and others initially believed someone was playing a prank on them. After observing more of these massive footprints, he contacted reporter Andrew Genzoli of the Humboldt Times newspaper. Genzoli interviewed lumber workers and wrote articles about the mysterious footprints, introducing the name "Bigfoot" in relation to the tracks and the local tales of large, hairy wild men. A plaster cast was made of the footprints and Crew appeared, holding one of the casts, on the front page of the newspaper on October 6, 1958. The story spread rapidly as Genzoli began to receive correspondence from major media outlets including the New York Times and Los Angeles Times. As a result, the term Bigfoot became widespread as a reference to an apparently large, unknown creature leaving massive footprints in Northern California.

In 2002, the family of Jerry Crew's deceased coworker Ray Wallace revealed a collection of large, carved wooden feet stored in his basement. They stated that Wallace had been secretly making the footprints and was responsible for the tracks discovered by Crew. Similarly, some have theorized that most photographs of oversized footprints in the wild could be hoaxes created by carved wooden feet.

Wallace was inspired by another hoaxer, Rant Mullens, who revealed information about his hoaxes in 1982. In the 1930s in Toledo, Washington, Mullens and a group of other foresters carved pairs of large feet made of wood and used them to create footprints in the mud to scare huckleberry pickers in the Gifford Pinchot National Forest. The group would also claim to be responsible for hoaxing the alleged Ape Canyon incident in 1924. Mullens and the group of foresters began referring to themselves as the St. Helens Apes, and would later have a cave dedicated to them.

Wallace, also from Toledo, knew Mullens and stated he collaborated with him to obtain a pair of the large wooden feet and subsequently used them to create footprints on the 1958 construction site as a means to scare away potential thieves.

==== Other historical uses of Bigfoot ====
In the 1830s, a Wyandot chief was nicknamed "Big Foot" due to his significant size, strength and large feet. Potawatomi Chief Big Foot is today synonymous with the area of Walworth County, Wisconsin, and has a state park and school named for him. William A. A. Wallace, a famous 19th century Texas Ranger, was nicknamed "Bigfoot" due to his large feet and today has a town named for him: Bigfoot, Texas. Lakota leader Spotted Elk was also called "Chief Big Foot". In the late 19th and early 20th centuries, at least two enormous marauding grizzly bears were widely noted in the press and each nicknamed "Bigfoot." The first grizzly bear called "Bigfoot" was reportedly killed near Fresno, California, in 1895 after killing sheep for 15 years; his weight was estimated at 2,000 pounds (900 kg). The second one was active in Idaho in the 1890s and 1900s between the Snake and Salmon rivers, and supernatural powers were attributed to it.

=== Regional and other names ===
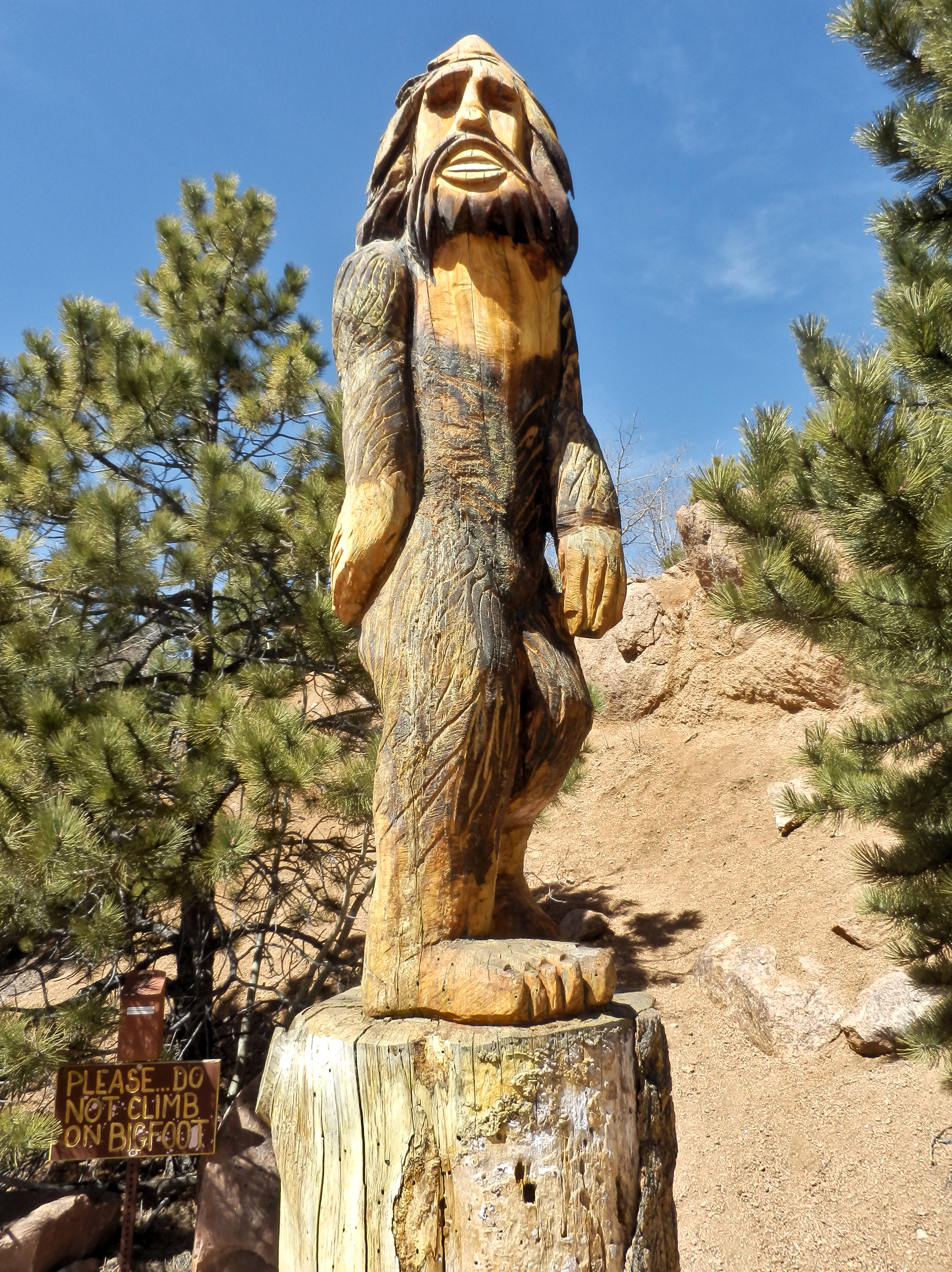
"Bigfoot" carving at the Crystal Creek Reservoir in Colorado

Many regions throughout North America have different names for Bigfoot. In Canada, the name Sasquatch is widely used in addition to Bigfoot. According to Merriam-Webster, the use of Sasquatch in the English language is a synonym for Bigfoot, and predates it by approximately fifty years.

The United States uses both of these names but also has numerous names and descriptions of the creatures depending on the region and area in which they are allegedly sighted. The term Wood Ape is also used by some as a means to deviate from the perceived mythical connotation surrounding the name Bigfoot. Other names include Bushman, Treeman, and Wildman. Other regional names include:

- Alabama: White Thang
- Alaska: Nantinaq
- Arizona: Mogollon Monster
- Arkansas: Fouke Monster
- Delaware: Selbyville Swamp Monster
- Florida: Skunk ape
- Georgia: Elkins Creek Beast
- Illinois: Big Muddy Monster
- Kentucky: Hillbilly Beast, Spottsville Monster
- Louisiana: Honey Island Swamp monster
- Michigan: Dewey Lake Monster
- Mississippi: Chatawa Monster
- Missouri: Momo the Monster
- New York: Monster of Whitehall
- Ohio: Grassman, Minerva Monster
- Virginia: Wood Booger
- West Virginia: Old Men of the Mountain

== History ==
=== Folklore and early records ===
Ecologist Robert Pyle argues that most cultures have accounts of human-like giants in their folk history, expressing a need for "some larger-than-life creature". Each language had its name for the creature featured in the local version of such legends. Many names mean something like "wild man" or "hairy man", although other names described common actions that it was said to perform, such as eating clams or shaking trees. European folklore traditionally had many instances of the "wild man of the woods," or "wild people," often described as "a naked creature covered in hair, with only the face, feet and hands (and in some cases the knees, elbows, or breasts) remaining bare" These European wild people ranged from human hermits, to human-like monsters. Upon migrating to North America, myths of the "wild people" persisted, with documented sightings of "wild people" reported in what is now New York state and Pennsylvania. A 2007 paper titled "Images of the Wildman Inside and Outside Europe" stated:

To be sure, the modern sasquatch is largely the product of a European-derived culture, as possibly to an even greater extent is the Australian yahoo; accordingly, traces of the European wildman are discernible in both figures. Yet the sasquatch is partly rooted in Amerindian representations of hairy hominoids, even though the relationship between these, which are often described as small, and the giant sasquatch of the popular Canadian and American imagination is hardly straightforward

— Gregory Forth,

Many of the indigenous cultures across the North American continent include tales of mysterious hair-covered creatures living in forests, and according to anthropologist David Daegling, these legends existed long before contemporary reports of the creature described as Bigfoot. These stories differed in their details regionally and between families in the same community and are particularly prevalent in the Pacific Northwest.

Dr. John A. McClelland, retired professor of anthropology at the University of Arizona states, "Legends of wild humanoid creatures are as old as human history and span the globe. Names and other details vary, but common traits of these undocumented animals are bipedalism, gigantic size, hair-covered bodies, and a potential to cause harm. A Native American tradition in the Pacific Northwest tells of a giant hair-covered ogre named Tsonoqua who steals children and food. This is likely the origin of the Sasquatch or Bigfoot legend".

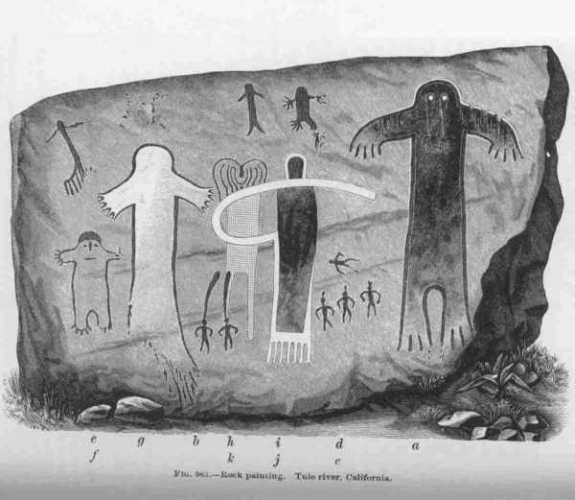
A reproduction of the petroglyphs at Painted Rock

On the Tule River Indian Reservation, petroglyphs created by a tribe of Yokuts at a site called Painted Rock are alleged by Kathy Moskowitz Strain, author of the 2008 book Giants, Cannibals, Monsters: Bigfoot in Native Culture, to depict a group of Bigfoots called "the Family". The largest glyph is called "Hairy Man" (also known as Mayak Datat) and they are estimated to be 1,000 years old.

According to the Tulare County Board of Education in 1975, "Big Foot, the Hairy Man, was a creature that was like a great big giant with long, shaggy hair. His long shaggy hair made him look like a big animal. He was good in a way, because he ate the animals that might harm people", and Yokuts parents warned their children not to venture near the river at night or they may encounter the creature.

16th-century Spanish explorers and Mexican settlers told tales of the Dark Watchers, large creatures alleged to stalk their camps at night. In the region that is now Mississippi, a Jesuit priest was living with the Natchez in 1721 and reported stories of hairy creatures in the forest known to scream loudly and steal livestock. The folklore of the Cherokee includes tales of the Tsul 'Kalu, who were described as "slant-eyed giants" that resided in the Appalachian Mountains, and is sometimes associated with Bigfoot.

Members of the Lummi tell tales about creatures known as Ts'emekwes. The stories are similar to each other in the general descriptions of Ts'emekwes, but details differed among various family accounts concerning the creature's diet and activities. Some regional versions tell of more threatening creatures: the stiyaha or kwi-kwiyai were a nocturnal race, and children were warned against saying the names so that the "monsters" would not come and carry them off to be killed. The Haudenosaunee tell of an aggressive, hair covered giant with rock-hard skin known as the Ot ne yar heh or "Stone Giant", more commonly referred to as the Genoskwa. In 1847, Paul Kane reported stories by the natives about skoocooms, a race of cannibalistic wild men living on the peak of Mount St. Helens. U.S. President Theodore Roosevelt, in his 1893 book, The Wilderness Hunter, writes of a story he was told by an elderly mountain man named Bauman in which a foul-smelling, bipedal creature ransacked his beaver trapping camp, stalked him, and later became hostile when it fatally broke his companion's neck. Roosevelt notes that Bauman appeared fearful while telling the story but attributed the trapper's German ancestry to have potentially influenced him.

The Alutiiq of the Kenai Peninsula in Alaska tell of the Nantinaq, a Bigfoot-like creature. This folklore was featured in the Discovery+ television series, Alaskan Killer Bigfoot, which claims the Nantinaq was responsible for the population decrease of Portlock in the 1940s.

Less menacing versions have been recorded, such as one by Reverend Elkanah Walker in 1840. Walker was a Protestant missionary who recorded stories of giants among the natives living near Spokane, Washington. These giants were said to live on and around the peaks of the nearby mountains, stealing salmon from the fishermen's nets.

==== Ape Canyon incident ====
On July 16, 1924, an article in The Oregonian made national news when a story was published describing a conflict between a group of gold prospectors and a group of "ape-men" in a gorge near Mount St. Helens. The prospectors reported encountering "gorilla men" near their remote cabin. One of the men, Fred Beck, indicated that he shot one of the creatures with a rifle. That night, they reported coming under attack by the creatures, who were said to have thrown large rocks at the cabin, damaging the roof and knocking Beck unconscious. The men fled the area the following morning. The U.S. Forest Service investigated the site of the alleged incident. The investigators found no compelling evidence of the event and concluded it was likely a fabrication. Stories of large, hair-covered bipedal ape-men or "mountain devils" had been a persistent piece of folklore in the area for centuries prior to the alleged incident. Today, the area is known as Ape Canyon, in recognition of its status in Bigfoot lore.

=== Patterson–Gimlin film ===
A stabilized version of the film

On October 20, 1967, Bigfoot enthusiast Roger Patterson and his partner Robert "Bob" Gimlin were filming a Bigfoot docudrama in an area called Bluff Creek in Northern California. The pair claimed they came upon a Bigfoot and filmed the encounter. The 59.5-second-long video, dubbed the Patterson–Gimlin film (PGF), has become iconic in popular culture and Bigfoot-related history and lore. The PGF continues to be a highly scrutinized, analyzed, and debated subject.

Academic experts from related fields have typically judged the film as providing no supportive data of any scientific value, with perhaps the most common proposed explanation being that it was a hoax.

== Proposed explanations ==
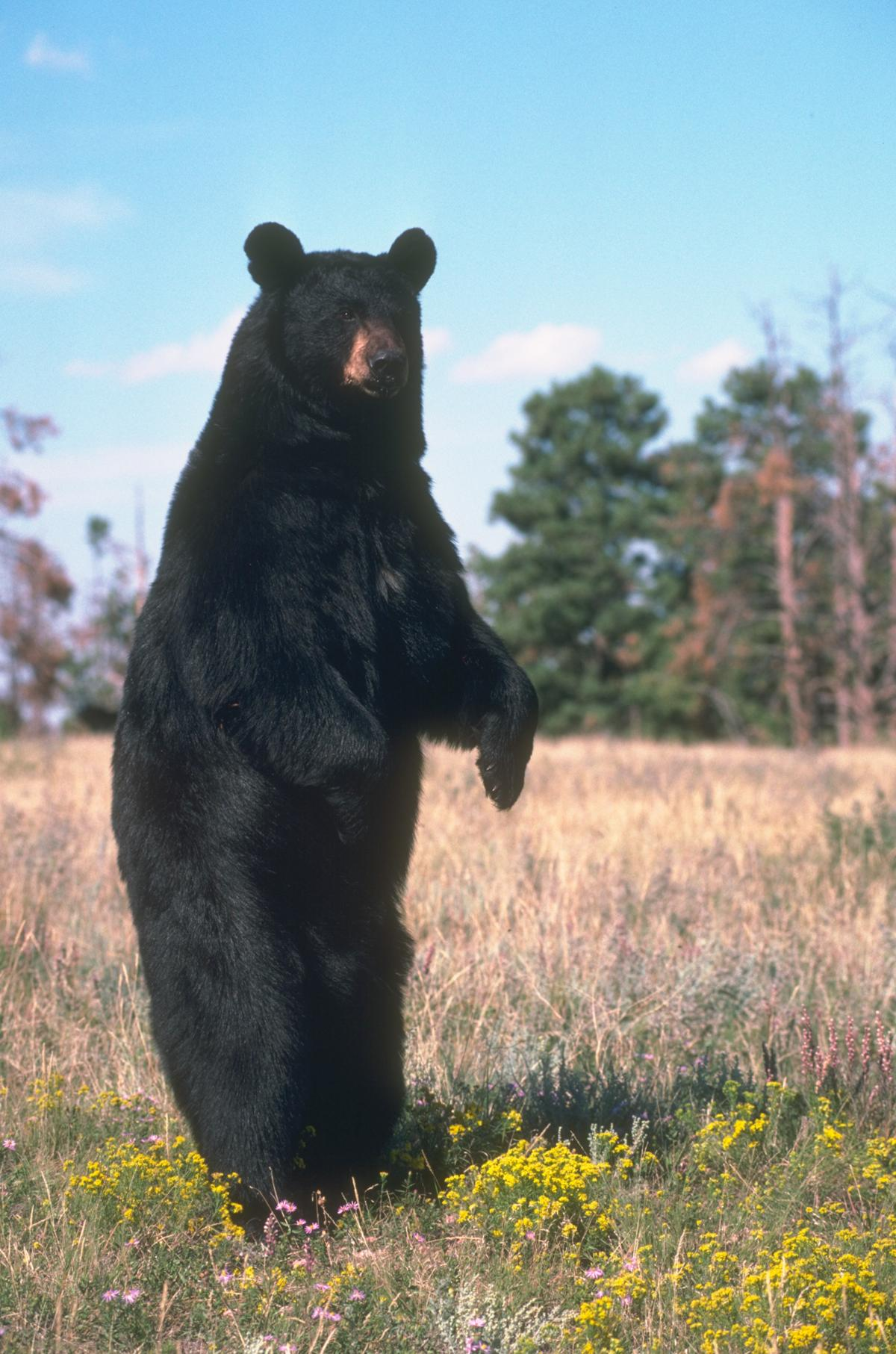
A black bear standing upright

Various explanations have been suggested for sightings and to offer conjecture on what existing animal has been misidentified in supposed sightings of Bigfoot. Scientists typically attribute sightings to hoaxes or misidentifications of known animals and their tracks, particularly black bears.

=== Misidentification ===
==== Bears ====
Scientists theorize that mistaken identification of American black bears as Bigfoot are a likely explanation for most reported sightings, particularly when observers view a subject from afar, are in dense foliage, or there are poor lighting conditions. Additionally, black bears have been observed and recorded walking upright, often as the result of an injury. While upright, adult black bears stand roughly 5–7 feet (1.5–2.1 m), and grizzly bears roughly 8–9 feet (2.4–2.7 m).

According to data scientist Floe Foxon, more people report seeing Bigfoot in areas with documented black bear populations. Foxon concludes, "If bigfoot is there, it may be many bears". In areas with minimal or no known black bear populations, Foxon attributes alleged sightings to "misidentification of other animals (including humans), among other possibilities".

==== Escaped apes ====
Some have proposed that sightings of Bigfoot may simply be people observing and misidentifying known great apes such as chimpanzees, gorillas, and orangutans that have escaped from captivity, for instance from zoos or circuses, and exotic pets belonging to private owners. This explanation is often proposed in relation to the Skunk ape, as some scientists argue the humid subtropical climate of the southeastern United States could potentially support a population of escaped apes.

==== Humans ====
Humans have been mistaken for Bigfoot, with some incidents leading to injuries. In 2013, a 21-year-old man in Oklahoma was arrested after he told law enforcement he accidentally shot his friend in the back while their group was allegedly hunting for Bigfoot. In 2017, a shamanist wearing clothing made of animal furs was vacationing in a North Carolina forest when local reports of alleged Bigfoot sightings flooded in. The Greenville Police Department issued a public notice not to shoot Bigfoot for fear of mistakenly injuring or killing someone in a fur suit. In 2018 a person was shot-at multiple times by a hunter near Helena, Montana, who claimed he mistook him for a Bigfoot.

Additionally, some have suggested feral humans or hermits living in the wilderness as being another explanation for alleged Bigfoot sightings. One story, the Wild Man of the Navidad, tells of a wild ape-man who roamed the wilderness of eastern Texas in the mid-19th century, stealing food and goods from residents. A search party allegedly captured an escaped African slave linked to the story. During the 1980s, several psychologically damaged American Vietnam veterans were stated by the state of Washington's veterans' affairs director, Randy Fisher, to have been living in remote wooded areas of the state.

==== Pareidolia ====
Some have proposed that pareidolia may explain Bigfoot sightings, specifically the tendency to observe human-like faces and figures within the natural environment. Photos and videos of poor quality alleged to depict Bigfoots are often attributed to this phenomenon and commonly referred to as "Blobsquatch".

==== Misidentified vocalizations ====
The majority of mainstream scientists maintain that the source of the sounds often attributed to Bigfoot are either hoaxes, anthropomorphization, or likely misidentified and produced by known animals such as owl, wolf, coyote, and fox.

=== Hoaxes ===
Both Bigfoot believers and non-believers agree that many reported sightings are hoaxes.

=== Gigantopithecus ===
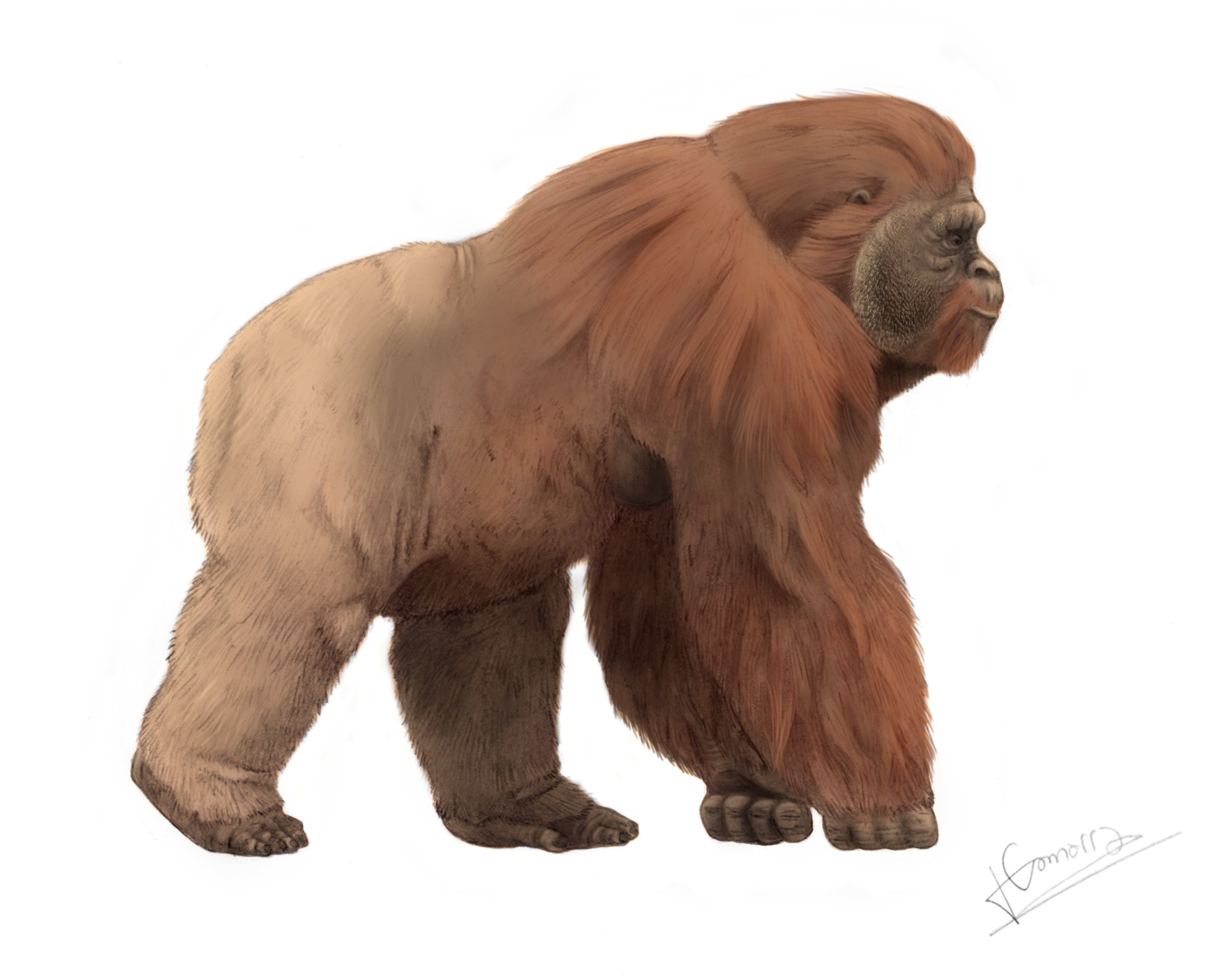
Reconstruction of Gigantopithecus with a speculative large build, gorilla-like posture, and orange hair

Bigfoot proponents Grover Krantz and Geoffrey H. Bourne both believed that Bigfoot could be a relict population of the extinct southeast Asian ape species Gigantopithecus blacki. According to Bourne, G. blacki may have followed the many other species of animals that migrated across the Bering land bridge to the Americas. To date, no Gigantopithecus fossils have been found in the Americas. In Asia, the only recovered fossils have been of mandibles and teeth, leaving uncertainty about G. blacki's locomotion. Krantz has argued that G. blacki could have been bipedal, based on his extrapolation from the shape of its mandible. However, the relevant part of the mandible is not present in any fossils. The consensus view is that G. blacki was quadrupedal, as its enormous mass would have made it difficult for it to adopt a bipedal gait.

Anthropologist Matt Cartmill criticizes the G. blacki hypothesis:

The trouble with this account is that Gigantopithecus was not a hominin and maybe not even a crown group hominoid; yet the physical evidence implies that Bigfoot is an upright biped with buttocks and a long, stout, permanently adducted hallux. These are hominin autapomorphies, not found in other mammals or other bipeds. It seems unlikely that Gigantopithecus would have evolved these uniquely hominin traits in parallel.

Paleoanthropologist Bernard G. Campbell writes: "That Gigantopithecus is in fact extinct has been questioned by those who believe it survives as the Yeti of the Himalayas and the Sasquatch of the north-west American coast. But the evidence for these creatures is not convincing."

=== Extinct hominidae ===
Primatologist John R. Napier and anthropologist Gordon Strasenburg have suggested a species of Paranthropus as a possible candidate for Bigfoot's identity, such as Paranthropus robustus, with its gorilla-like crested skull and bipedal gait.

Michael Rugg of the Bigfoot Discovery Museum presented a comparison between human, Gigantopithecus, and Meganthropus skulls (reconstructions made by Grover Krantz) in episodes 131 and 132 of the Bigfoot Discovery Museum Show. Bigfoot enthusiasts that think Bigfoot may be the "missing link" between apes and humans have promoted the idea that Bigfoot is a descendant of Gigantopithecus blacki, but that ape diverged from orangutans around 12 million years ago and is not related to humans.

Some suggest Neanderthal, Homo erectus, or Homo heidelbergensis to be the creature, but, like all other great apes, no remains of any of those species have been found in the Americas.

== Scientific view ==
Expert consensus is that allegations of the existence of Bigfoot are not credible. Belief in the existence of such a large, ape-like creature is more often attributed to hoaxes, confusion, or delusion rather than to sightings of a genuine creature. In a 1996 USA Today article, Washington State zoologist John Crane said "[t]here is no such thing as Bigfoot. No data other than material that's clearly been fabricated has ever been presented." The author of one review article states that, in their opinion, it is impossible even to consider cryptozoology a science if it continues to consider Bigfoot seriously.

As with other similar beings, climate and food supply issues would make such a creature's survival in reported habitats unlikely. Bigfoot is alleged to live in regions unusual for a large, nonhuman primate, i.e., temperate latitudes in the northern hemisphere; all recognized nonhuman apes are found in the tropics of Africa and Asia. Great apes have not been found in the fossil record in the Americas, and no Bigfoot remains are known to have been found. Phillips Stevens, a cultural anthropologist at the University at Buffalo, summarized the scientific consensus as follows:

It defies all logic that there is a population of these things sufficient to keep them going. What it takes to maintain any species, especially a long-lived species, is having a breeding population. That requires a substantial number, spread out over a fairly wide area where they can find sufficient food and shelter to keep hidden from all the investigators.

In the 1970s, when Bigfoot "experts" were frequently given high-profile media coverage, McLeod writes that the scientific community generally avoided lending credence to such fringe theories by refusing even to debate them.

Primatologist Jane Goodall was asked for her personal opinion of Bigfoot in a 2002 interview on National Public Radio's Science Friday. Goodall responded saying, "Well, now you will be amazed when I tell you that I'm sure that they exist." She later added, "Well, I'm a romantic, so I always wanted them to exist", and "Of course, the big, the big criticism of all this is, 'Where is the body?' You know, why isn't there a body? I can't answer that, and maybe they don't exist, but I want them to." In 2012, when asked again by the Huffington Post, Goodall said "I'm fascinated and would actually love them to exist", adding, "Of course, it's strange that there has never been a single authentic hide or hair of the Bigfoot, but I've read all the accounts."

Paleontologist and author Darren Naish states in a 2016 article for Scientific American that if "Bigfoot" existed, an abundance of evidence would also exist that cannot be found anywhere today, making the existence of such a creature exceedingly unlikely.

Naish summarizes the evidence for "Bigfoot" that would exist if the creature itself existed:

- If "Bigfoot" existed, so would consistent reports of uniform vocalizations throughout North America as can be identified for any existing large animal in the region, rather than the scattered and widely varied "Bigfoot" sounds haphazardly reported;
- If "Bigfoot" existed, so would many tracks that would be easy for experts to find, just as they easily find tracks for other rare megafauna in North America, rather than a complete lack of such tracks alongside "tracks" that experts agree are fraudulent;
- Finally, if "Bigfoot" existed, an abundance of "Bigfoot" DNA would already have been found, again as it has been found for similar animals, instead of the current state of affairs, where there is no confirmed DNA for such a creature whatsoever.

=== Researchers ===
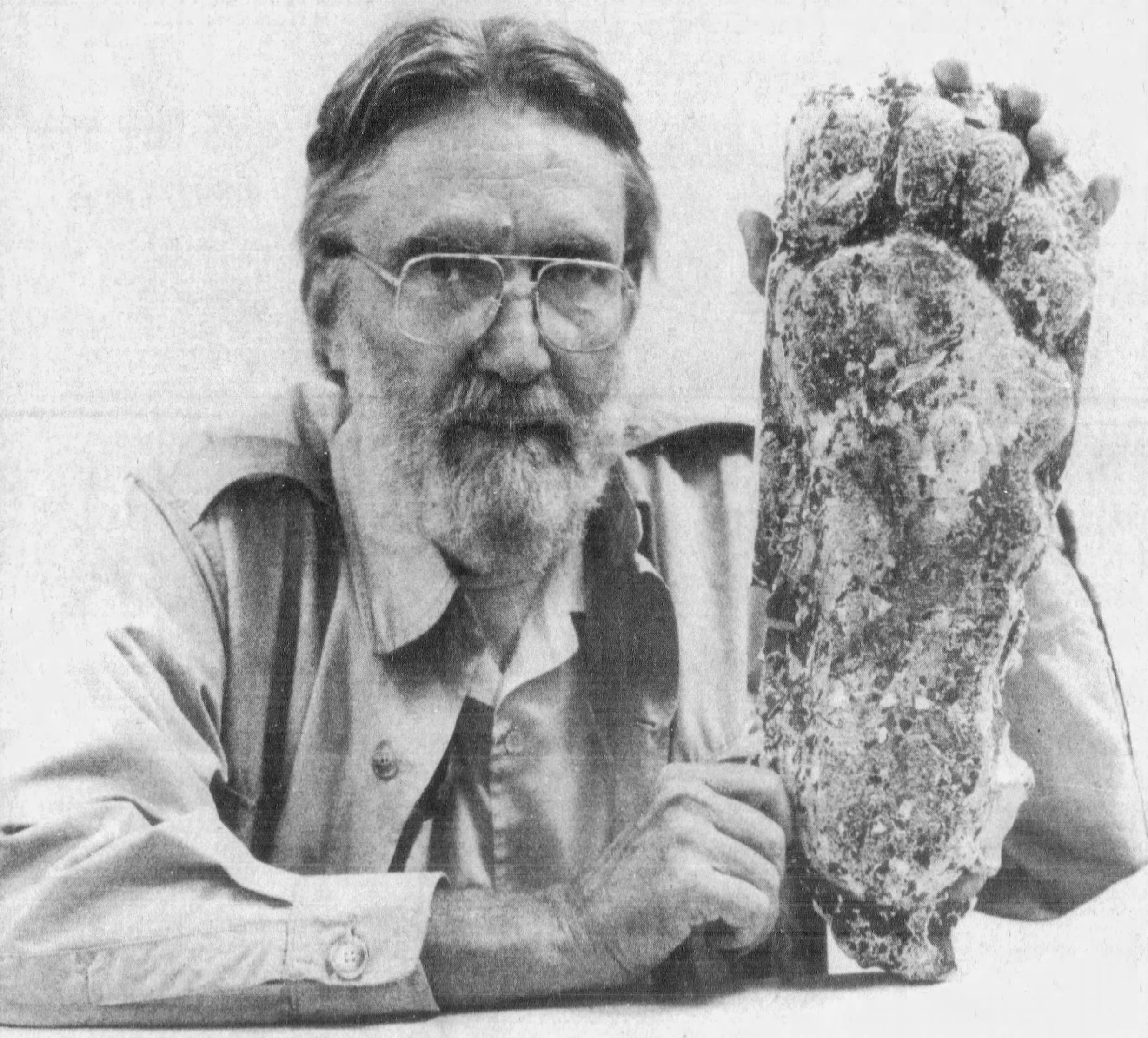
Anthropologist Grover Krantz poses with a plaster cast of an alleged Bigfoot footprint

Ivan T. Sanderson and Bernard Heuvelmans, founders of the study of cryptozoology, spent parts of their career searching for Bigfoot. Later scientists who researched the topic included Jason Jarvis, Carleton S. Coon, George Allen Agogino and William Charles Osman Hill, though they later stopped their research due to lack of evidence for the alleged creature.

John Napier asserts that the scientific community's attitude towards Bigfoot stems primarily from insufficient evidence. Other scientists who have shown varying degrees of interest in the creature are Grover Krantz, Jeffrey Meldrum, John Bindernagel, David J. Daegling, George Schaller, Russell Mittermeier, Daris Swindler, Esteban Sarmiento, and Mireya Mayor.

=== Formal studies ===
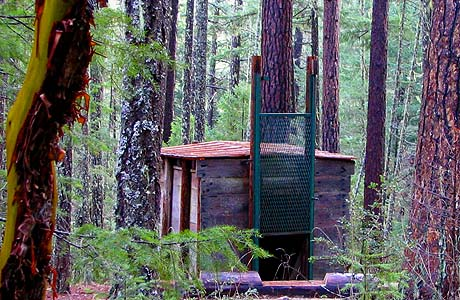
2007 photograph of the Bigfoot trap within the Rogue River–Siskiyou National Forest

One study was conducted by John Napier and published in his book Bigfoot: The Yeti and Sasquatch in Myth and Reality in 1973. Napier wrote that if a conclusion is to be reached based on scant extant "'hard' evidence," science must declare "Bigfoot does not exist." However, he found it difficult to entirely reject thousands of alleged tracks, "scattered over 125,000 square miles" (325,000 km^{2}) or to dismiss all "the many hundreds" of eyewitness accounts. Napier concluded, "I am convinced that Sasquatch exists, but whether it is all it is cracked up to be is another matter altogether. There must be something in north-west America that needs explaining, and that something leaves man-like footprints."

In 1974, the National Wildlife Federation funded a field study seeking Bigfoot evidence. No formal federation members were involved and the study made no notable discoveries. Also in 1974, the now defunct North American Wildlife Research Team constructed a "Bigfoot trap" in the Rogue River–Siskiyou National Forest. The trap was baited with animal carcasses, and did manage to capture multiple bears, but no Bigfoot. Upkeep of the trap ended in the early 1980s, but in 2006 the United States Forest Service repaired the trap, which today is a tourist destination along the Collings Mountain hiking trail.

Beginning in the late 1970s, physical anthropologist Grover Krantz published several articles and four book-length treatments of Bigfoot. However, his work was found to contain multiple scientific failings including falling for hoaxes.

A study published in the Journal of Biogeography in 2009 by J.D. Lozier et al. used ecological niche modeling on reported sightings of Bigfoot, using their locations to infer preferred ecological parameters. They found a very close match with the ecological parameters of the American black bear. They also note that an upright bear looks much like a Bigfoot's purported appearance and consider it highly improbable that two species should have very similar ecological preferences, concluding that Bigfoot sightings, if not outright fabricated, are likely misidentified sightings of black bears.

In the first systematic genetic analysis of thirty hair samples that were suspected to be from Bigfoot-like creatures, only one was found to be of primate origin, and was identified as human. A joint study by the University of Oxford and Lausanne's Cantonal Museum of Zoology and published in the Proceedings of the Royal Society B in 2014, the team used a previously published cleaning method to remove all surface contamination and the ribosomal mitochondrial DNA 12S fragment of the sample. The sample was sequenced and then compared to GenBank to identify the species origin. The samples submitted were from different parts of the world, including the United States, Russia, the Himalayas, and Sumatra. Other than one sample of human origin, all but two are from common animals. Black and brown bears accounted for most of the samples; other animals include cow, horse, dog/wolf/coyote, sheep, goat, deer, raccoon, porcupine, and tapir. The last two samples were thought to match a fossilized genetic sample of a 40,000 year old polar bear of the Pleistocene epoch; a second test identified these hairs as being from a rare type of brown bear.

In 2019, the FBI declassified an analysis it conducted on alleged Bigfoot hairs in 1976. Bigfoot researcher Peter Byrne sent the FBI fifteen hairs attached to a small skin fragment and asked if the bureau could assist him in identifying it. Jay Cochran Jr., assistant director of the FBI's Scientific and Technical Services division responded in 1977 that the hairs were of deer family origin.

== Claims ==
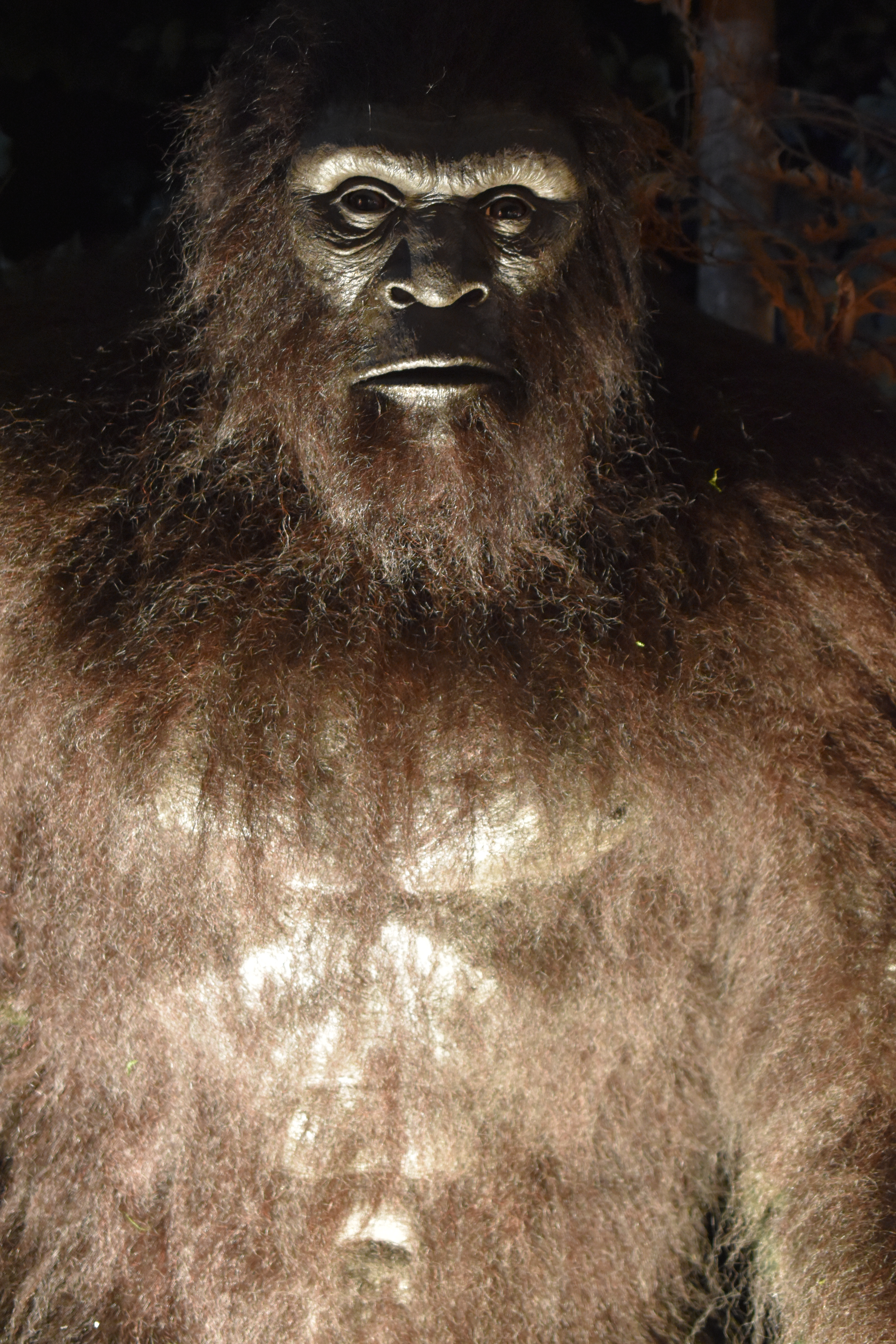
Bigfoot model created by American animatronic and prop production company Unit 70 Studios. Nicknamed "Murphy" and described as a "life size replica", it is currently exhibited at the North American Bigfoot Center in Boring, Oregon.

Claims about the origins and characteristics of Bigfoot vary. Thomas Sewid, a Bigfoot researcher and member of the Kwakwakaʼwakw tribe claims, "They're just the other tribe. They're just big, hairy humans with nocturnal vision that choose not to have weapons or fire or permanent shelters".

The subject of Bigfoot has also crossed over with other paranormal claims, including that Bigfoot, extraterrestrials, and UFOs are related or that Bigfoot are psychic, can shapeshift, are able to cross into different dimensions, or are completely supernatural in origin. Some have claimed that Bigfoot have telepathic abilities and are able to communicate with humans using "mindspeak". Additionally, claims regarding Bigfoot have been associated with conspiracy theories including a government cover-up. In Mormon folklore, Bigfoot is often identified with the biblical figure Cain.

There have also been claims that Bigfoot is responsible for the disappearances of people in the wilderness, such as the 1969 disappearance of Dennis Martin in Great Smoky Mountains National Park. The 2025 limited series Bigfoot Took Her explores the 1987 disappearance of teenager Theresa Bier in the Sierra National Forest and the event's connection to Bigfoot.

Additionally, there have been claims that Bigfoot has been responsible for vehicle accidents, vandalizing property, delaying construction, and killing people. There have been claims that a remote fishing cabin on Snelgrove Lake in Ontario, Canada, was vandalized by Bigfoot. These claims were featured in the 2007 episode "Sasquatch Attack?" of the History Channel series MonsterQuest. In 2022, a man from Oklahoma claimed he killed his friend because he believed the friend had summoned Bigfoot and that he was going to be sacrificed to the creature.

Most anecdotal accounts of Bigfoot encounters result in the creatures hiding or fleeing from people. The 2021 Hulu documentary series, Sasquatch, describes marijuana farmers telling stories of Bigfoots harassing and killing people within the Emerald Triangle region in the 1970s through the 1990s; and specifically the alleged murder of three migrant workers in 1993. Investigative journalist David Holthouse attributes the stories to illegal drug operations using the local Bigfoot lore to scare away the competition, specifically superstitious immigrants, and that the high rate of murder and missing persons in the area is due to human actions.

=== Sightings ===
According to Live Science, there have been over 10,000 reported Bigfoot sightings in the continental United States. About one-third of all claims of Bigfoot sightings are located in the Pacific Northwest, with the remaining reports spread throughout the rest of North America. Most reports are considered mistakes or hoaxes, even by those researchers who claim Bigfoot exists.

Sightings predominantly occur in the northwestern region of Washington state, Oregon, Northern California, and British Columbia. According to data collected from the Bigfoot Field Researchers Organization's (BFRO) Bigfoot sightings database in 2019, Washington has over 2,000 reported sightings, California over 1,600, Pennsylvania over 1,300, New York and Oregon over 1,000, and Texas has just over 800. The debate over the legitimacy of Bigfoot sightings reached a peak in the 1970s, and Bigfoot has been regarded as the first widely popularized example of pseudoscience in American culture.

Reports of alleged Bigfoot sightings are often featured in news stories throughout the United States.

In early March 2026, a series of alleged Bigfoot sightings reported in Northeast Ohio garnered media attention. One of these alleged sightings involved the witnesses reporting it to the Stark County, Ohio sheriff's office, who reported no findings apart from a "musky ammonia" smell. According to Jeremiah Byron, host of the Bigfoot Society podcast, a cluster of alleged and reported sightings in this area occurred in the 1970s, giving rise to the folklore of the "Minerva Monster".

==== Alleged behavior ====
Some Bigfoot researchers allege that Bigfoot throws rocks as territorial displays and for communication. Other alleged behaviors include audible blows struck against trees or "wood knocking", further alleged to be communicative. Skeptics argue that these behaviors are easily hoaxed. Additionally, structures of broken and twisted foliage seemingly placed in specific areas have been attributed by some to Bigfoot behavior. In some reports, lodgepole pine and other small trees have been observed bent, uprooted, or stacked in patterns such as weaved and crisscrossed, leading some to theorize that they are potential territorial markings. Some instances have also included entire deer skeletons being suspended high in trees. Some researchers and enthusiasts believe Bigfoot construct teepee-like structures out of dead trees and foliage. In Washington state, a team of amateur Bigfoot researchers called the Olympic Project claimed to have discovered a collection of nests. The group brought in primatologists to study them, with the conclusion being that they appear to have been created by a primate.

Jeremiah Byron, host of the Bigfoot Society Podcast, believes Bigfoot are omnivores, stating, "They eat both plants and meat. I've seen accounts that they eat everything from berries, leaves, nuts, and fruit to salmon, rabbit, elk, and bear. Ronny Le Blanc, host of Expedition Bigfoot on the Travel Channel indicated he has heard anecdotal reports of Bigfoot allegedly hunting and consuming deer. In the 2001 nature documentary Great North, a dark bipedal figure was captured on film while the filmmakers were recording a herd of caribou. The footage has sparked debate, as some Bigfoot researchers claim the figure is a Bigfoot stalking the caribou. In 2016, Bigfoot researcher ThinkerThunker released a YouTube video in which he interviewed one of the Great North directors, William Reeve, who claims it could not have been a human but was possibly a bear, although he and his crew denied seeing any bears while filming.

Some Bigfoot researchers have reported the creatures moving or taking possession of intentional "gifts" left by humans such as food and jewelry, and leaving items in their places such as rocks and twigs.

Many alleged sightings are reported to occur at night leading some cryptozoologists to hypothesize that Bigfoot may possess nocturnal tendencies. However, experts find such behavior untenable in a supposed ape- or human-like creature, as all known apes, including humans, are diurnal, with only lesser primates exhibiting nocturnality. Most anecdotal sightings of Bigfoot describe the creatures allegedly observed as solitary, although some reports have described groups being allegedly observed together.

==== Alleged vocalizations ====
Alleged vocalizations such as howls, screams, moans, grunts, whistles, and even a form of supposed language have been reported and allegedly recorded. In 1994, Bigfoot researcher Matt Moneymaker recorded audio in Columbiana County, Ohio, that the Bigfoot Field Researchers Organization (BFRO) claims is a Bigfoot producing a "moaning howl". Some of these alleged vocalization recordings have been analyzed by individuals such as retired U.S. Navy cryptologic linguist Scott Nelson. He analyzed audio recordings from the early 1970s said to be recorded in the Sierra Nevada mountains dubbed the "Sierra Sounds" and stated, "It is definitely a language, it is definitely not human in origin, and it could not have been faked". Les Stroud has spoken of a strange vocalization he heard in the wilderness while filming Survivorman that he stated sounded primate in origin. There have also been claims that Bigfoot can imitate the sounds of other animals.

A number of anecdotal reports of Bigfoot encounters have resulted in witnesses claiming to be disoriented, dizzy and anxious. Some Bigfoot researchers, such as paranormal author Nick Redfern, have proposed that Bigfoot may produce infrasound.

==== Alleged encounters ====
According to a Skawahlook First Nation story, Jeannie Chapman and her three children reported seeing and fleeing from a gigantic, hair-covered creature on their property near Ruby Creek, British Columbia in 1941. Her husband George reported that he returned home to investigate and found enormous human-like footprints and damage to the woodshed. The family further reported the creature returned nightly for one week; fearful, they moved away permanently.

In Fouke, Arkansas, in 1971, a family reported that a large, hair-covered creature startled a woman after reaching through a window. This alleged incident caused hysteria in the Fouke area and inspired the horror movie, The Legend of Boggy Creek (1972). The report was later deemed a hoax.

In 1974, the New York Times presented the dubious tale of Albert Ostman, a Canadian prospector, who stated that he was kidnapped and held captive by a family of Bigfoot for six days in 1924.

In 1994, former U.S. Forest Service ranger Paul Freeman, a Bigfoot researcher, videotaped an alleged Bigfoot he reportedly encountered in the Blue Mountains in Oregon. The tape, often referred to as the Freeman footage, continues to be scrutinized and its authenticity debated. Freeman had previously gained media recognition in the 1980s for documenting alleged Bigfoot tracks, claiming they possessed dermal ridges.

On May 26, 1996, Lori Pate, who was on a camping trip near the Washington state-Canada border, videotaped a dark subject she reported encountering running across a field and claimed it was Bigfoot. The film, dubbed the Memorial Day Bigfoot footage, is often depicted in Bigfoot-related media, most notably in the 2003 documentary, Sasquatch: Legend Meets Science. In his research, Daniel Perez of the Skeptical Inquirer concluded that the footage was likely a hoax perpetuated by a human in a gorilla costume.

In May 2012, Bigfoot researcher Stacy Brown claimed he and his father encountered a Bigfoot in the Torreya State Park in Florida and recorded it on a forward-looking infrared camera.

In 2018, Bigfoot researcher Claudia Ackley garnered international attention after filing a lawsuit with the California Department of Fish and Wildlife (CDFW) for failing to acknowledge the existence of Bigfoot. Ackley claimed to have encountered and filmed a Bigfoot in the San Bernardino Mountains in 2017, describing what she saw as a "Neanderthal man with a lot of hair". Ackley contacted emergency services as well as the CDFW; a state investigator concluded that she encountered a bear. Until her death in 2023, Ackley also ran an online support group for individuals claiming to experience psychological trauma as a result of alleged Bigfoot encounters.

In October 2023, a woman named Shannon Parker uploaded a video of an alleged Bigfoot to Facebook. The footage went viral on social media and was shared via various news publications. Shannon Parker reported she and others observed the subject while riding a train on the Durango and Silverton Narrow Gauge Railroad in the San Juan Mountains in Colorado. The authenticity of the video was debated across social media. Skeptics on Reddit speculated it was a publicity hoax perpetrated by an RV company located in the area, Sasquatch Expedition Campers. The company denied the allegations.

In August 2026, a photograph taken in a marsh in Onondaga County, New York, sparked debate online. The 25 year old woman who took the photograph on her iPhone 17 told representatives from the Bigfoot Field Researchers Organization (BFRO) she was hiking alone when she noticed the figure in the pond and initially believed it to be a nude elderly man. The BFRO investigated the encounter and claimed the subject, dubbed the "Syracuse Figure", could be a juvenile Bigfoot.

Skeptics argue that many of these alleged encounters are easily hoaxed and the result of misidentification or outright fabrication.

=== Evidence claims ===
A body print taken in the year 2000 from the Gifford Pinchot National Forest in Washington state dubbed the Skookum cast is also believed by some to have been made by a Bigfoot that sat down in the mud to eat fruit left out by researchers during the filming of an episode of the Animal X television show. Skeptics believe the cast to have been made by a known animal such as an elk.

Alleged Bigfoot footprints are often suggested by Bigfoot enthusiasts as evidence for the creature's existence. Anthropologist Jeffrey Meldrum, who specializes in the study of primate bipedalism, possesses over 300 footprint casts that he maintains could not be made by wood carvings or human feet based on their anatomy, but instead are evidence of a large, non-human primate present today in North America. In 2005, Matt Crowley obtained a copy of an alleged Bigfoot footprint cast, called the "Onion Mountain Cast", and was able to painstakingly recreate the dermal ridges. Michael Dennett of the Skeptical Inquirer spoke to police investigator and primate fingerprint expert Jimmy Chilcutt in 2006 for comment on the replica and he stated, "Matt has shown artifacts can be created, at least under laboratory conditions, and field researchers need to take precautions". Chilcutt had previously stated that some of the alleged Bigfoot footprint plaster casts he examined were genuine due to the presence of "unique dermal ridges". Dennett states that Chilcutt published nothing to substantiate his claims, nor had anyone else published anything on that topic, with Chilcutt making his statements solely through a posting on the Internet. Dennett states further that no reviews on Chilcutt's statements had been performed beyond those by what Dennett states to be, "other Bigfoot enthusiasts".

2007 photograph alleged by the Bigfoot Field Researchers Organization to depict a juvenile Bigfoot

In 2007, the Bigfoot Field Researchers Organization claimed to have photographs depicting a juvenile Bigfoot allegedly captured on a camera trap in the Allegheny National Forest. The Pennsylvania Game Commission, however, stated that the photos were of a bear with mange. The Pennsylvania Game Commission unsuccessfully attempted to locate the suspected mangey bear. Scientist Vanessa Woods, after estimating that the subject in the photo had approximately 22 inches (560 mm) long arms and an 18.75 inches (476 mm) torso, concluded it was more comparable to a chimpanzee.

In 2015, Centralia College professor Michael Townsend claimed to have discovered prey bones with "human-like" bite impressions on the southside of Mount St. Helens. Townsend claimed the bites were over two times wider than a human bite, and that he and two of his students also found 16-inch footprints in the area.

In June 2026, Bigfoot enthusiast Charles "Snake" Stuart claimed he found a Bigfoot corpse in 2024 in the Adirondack Mountains and DNA testing showed it to be 58% Denisovan/Neanderthal and 41% modern human. Stuart invited scientists to examine the remains which were put on display at the New York State Fair. Skeptics dismissed Stuart's claims as a publicity stunt and hoax. Cornell University denied testing the DNA, with Stuart further claiming the university was engaging in a cover-up.

==== Melba Ketchum press release ====
After what The Huffington Post described as "a five-year study of purported Bigfoot (also known as Sasquatch) DNA samples", but prior to peer review of the work, DNA Diagnostics, a veterinary laboratory headed by veterinarian Melba Ketchum issued a press release on November 24, 2012, claiming that they had found proof that the Sasquatch "is a human relative that arose approximately 15,000 years ago as a hybrid cross of modern Homo sapiens with an unknown primate species." Ketchum called for this to be recognized officially, saying that "Government at all levels must recognize them as an indigenous people and immediately protect their human and Constitutional rights against those who would see in their physical and cultural differences a 'license' to hunt, trap, or kill them." Failing to find a scientific journal that would publish their results, Ketchum announced on February 13, 2013, that their research had been published in the DeNovo Journal of Science. Ketchum proposed the name Homo sapiens cognatus for the species.

The title "DeNovo: Journal of Science" in which the paper was published was found to be a Web site—registered anonymously only nine days before the paper was announced—whose first and only "journal" issue contained nothing but the "Sasquatch" article. Shortly after publication, the paper was analyzed and outlined by Sharon Hill of Doubtful News for the Committee for Skeptical Inquiry. Hill reported on the questionable journal, mismanaged DNA testing and poor quality paper, stating that "The few experienced geneticists who viewed the paper reported a dismal opinion of it noting it made little sense." The Scientist magazine also analyzed the paper, reporting that:

Geneticists who have seen the paper are not impressed. "To state the obvious, no data or analyses are presented that in any way support the claim that their samples come from a new primate or human-primate hybrid," Leonid Kruglyak of Princeton University told the Houston Chronicle. "Instead, analyses either come back as 100 percent human, or fail in ways that suggest technical artifacts." The website for the DeNovo Journal of Science was setup [sic] on February 4, and there is no indication that Ketchum's work, the only study it has published, was peer-reviewed.

=== Documented hoaxes ===
- In 1968, the frozen corpse of a supposed hair-covered hominid measuring 5 feet 11 inches (1.8 m) was paraded around the United States as part of a traveling exhibition. Many stories surfaced as to its origin, such as its having been killed by hunters in Minnesota or American soldiers near Da Nang during the Vietnam War. It was attributed by some to be proof of Bigfoot-like creatures. Primatologist John R. Napier studied the subject and concluded it was a hoax made of latex. Others disputed this, claiming Napier did not study the original subject. As of 2013, the subject, dubbed the Minnesota Iceman, was on display at the "Museum of the Weird" in Austin, Texas.
- Tom Biscardi, long-time Bigfoot enthusiast and CEO of "Searching for Bigfoot, Inc.", appeared on the Coast to Coast AM paranormal radio show on July 14, 2005, and said that he was "98% sure that his group will be able to capture a Bigfoot which they had been tracking in the Happy Camp, California, area." A month later, he announced on the same radio show that he had access to a captured Bigfoot and was arranging a pay-per-view event for people to see it. He appeared on Coast to Coast AM again a few days later to announce that there was no captive Bigfoot. He blamed an unnamed woman for misleading him, and said that the show's audience was gullible.
- On July 9, 2008, Rick Dyer and Matthew Whitton posted a video to YouTube, claiming that they had discovered the body of a dead Bigfoot in a forest in northern Georgia, which they named "Rickmat". Tom Biscardi was contacted to investigate. Dyer and Whitton received $50,000 from "Searching for Bigfoot, Inc." The story was covered by many major news networks, including BBC, CNN, ABC News, and Fox News. Soon after a press conference, the alleged Bigfoot body was delivered in a block of ice in a freezer with the Searching for Bigfoot team. When the contents were thawed, observers found that the hair was not real, the head was hollow, and the feet were rubber. Dyer and Whitton admitted that it was a hoax after being confronted by Steve Kulls, executive director of SquatchDetective.com.
- In August 2012, a man in Montana was killed by a car while perpetrating a Bigfoot hoax using a ghillie suit.
- In January 2014, Rick Dyer, perpetrator of a previous Bigfoot hoax, said that he had killed a Bigfoot in September 2012 outside San Antonio, Texas. He claimed to have had scientific tests conducted on the body, "from DNA tests to 3D optical scans to body scans. It is the real deal. It's Bigfoot, and Bigfoot's here, and I shot it, and now I'm proving it to the world." He said that he had kept the body in a hidden location, and he intended to take it on tour across North America in 2014. He released photos of the body and a video showing a few individuals' reactions to seeing it, but never released any of the tests or scans. He refused to disclose the test results or to provide biological samples. He said that the DNA results were done by an undisclosed lab and could not be matched to identify any known animal. Dyer said that he would reveal the body and tests on February 9, 2014, at a news conference at Washington University, but he never made the test results available. After the tour, the Bigfoot body was taken to Houston, Texas.
- On March 28, 2014, Dyer admitted on his Facebook page that his "Bigfoot corpse" was another hoax. He had paid Chris Russell of "Twisted Toybox" to manufacture the prop from latex, foam, and camel hair, which he nicknamed "Hank". Dyer earned approximately US$60,000 from the tour of this second fake Bigfoot corpse. He stated that he did kill a Bigfoot, but did not take the real body on tour for fear that it would be stolen.
- In April 2022, a man in Mobile, Alabama posted photos he claimed were of a Bigfoot to his Facebook page, indicating the Mobile County Sheriff's Office validated their authenticity and the team from Finding Bigfoot was being dispatched. The photos circulated on social media, attracting the attention of NBC 15. The man admitted the photos were an April Fools' Day hoax.
- On July 7, 2022, wildlife educator and media personality Coyote Peterson released a Facebook post in which he claimed to have excavated a large primate skull in British Columbia and smuggled it into the United States, further claiming to have initially hidden the discovery due to concerns of government intervention. The post went viral, garnering the attention of multiple scientists who dismissed the finding as a likely replica gorilla skull. Darren Naish, a vertebrate paleontologist, stated, "I'm told that Coyote Peterson does this sort of thing fairly often as clickbait, and that this is a stunt done to promote an upcoming video. Maybe this is meant to be taken as harmless fun. But in an age where anti-scientific feelings and conspiracy culture are a serious problem it—again—really isn't a good look. I think this stunt has backfired". In a follow-up video, Peterson claimed the situation was staged as a hypothetical example of what not to do in response to such a discovery.
- The 2026 documentary Capturing Bigfoot demonstrated that the 1967 Patterson-Gimlin film was a hoax, with Patterson's wife confessing to her husband's role in staging the film. Bob Hieronymous, who wore the Bigfoot suit, and Bob Gimlin were interviewed about their role in the creation of the film. Also included in the documentary was footage of an earlier "dress rehearsal" or first attempt at staging such a film.

== In popular culture ==
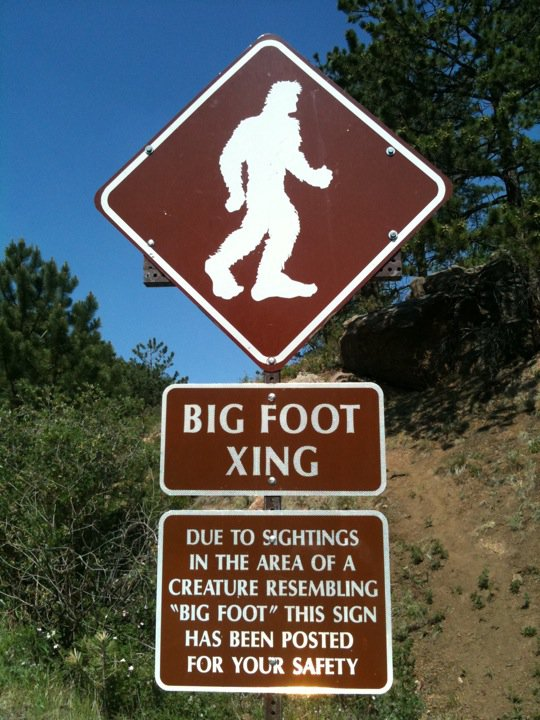
A tongue-in-cheek sign warning of Bigfoot crossings on Pikes Peak Highway in Colorado

Bigfoot has a demonstrable impact in popular culture, and has been compared to Michael Jordan as a cultural icon. In 2018, Smithsonian magazine declared, "Interest in the existence of the creature is at an all-time high". A poll in 2020 suggested that about 1 in 10 American adults believe Bigfoot to be "a real, living creature". According to a May 2023 data study, the terms "Bigfoot" and "Sasquatch" are input via Internet search engines over 200,000 times annually in the United States, and over 660,000 times worldwide. In 2025, the Unicode Consortium announced a Bigfoot emoji referred to as "hairy creature".

Bigfoot was featured on the personal patch of Canadian astronaut Jeremy Hansen's space suit during the 2026 Artemis II mission, reflecting the trait of honesty as part of the Teachings of the Seven Grandfathers. Also in 2026, the creature was featured prominently on a new West Virginia state license plate and selected for a USPS postage stamp.

The creature has inspired the naming of a medical company, music festival, amusement park ride, monster truck, and a Marvel Comics superhero. Some commentators have been critical of Bigfoot's rise to fame, arguing that the appearance of the creatures in cartoons, reality shows, and advertisements trivialize the potential validity of serious scientific research into their supposed existence. Others propose that society's fascination with the concept of Bigfoot stems from human interest in mystery, the paranormal, and loneliness. In a 2022 article discussing recent Bigfoot sightings, journalist John Keilman of the Chicago Tribune states, "As UFOs have gained newfound respect, becoming the subject of a Pentagon investigative panel, the alleged Bigfoot sighting is a reminder that other paranormal phenomena are still out there, entrancing true believers and amusing skeptics".

=== In the Pacific Northwest ===
Bigfoot and its likeness is symbolic with the Pacific Northwest and its culture, including the Cascadia movement. Sasquatch Provincial Park in British Columbia is named for the creature. Approximately 88 miles (142 km) of the California State Route 96 highway is designated the Bigfoot Scenic Byway, named for the region's association with Bigfoot sightings and folklore, including passing through the town of Willow Creek and by the Bluff Creek Historic Trail, near where the Patterson–Gimlin film was made. In September 2026, the "Sneaky Squatch PDX Art Hunt" in Portland, Oregon featured Bigfoot-inspired artwork in public spaces including an 8-foot-tall Bigfoot sculpture at Portland City Hall.

Two National Basketball Association teams located in the Pacific Northwest have used Bigfoot as a mascot. From 1987 until 1989, the mascot of the Portland Trail Blazers was former player Dale Schlueter in a Bigfoot costume. In 2023, the Trail Blazers introduced Douglas Fur, a hipster themed Bigfoot mascot. Squatch of the now-defunct Seattle SuperSonics was the team's mascot from 1993 until 2008. Legend the Bigfoot was selected as the official mascot for the 2022 World Athletics Championships held in Eugene, Oregon. Legend returned as the mascot for the World Athletics U20 Championships in 2026. In 2025, the Bigfoot Football Club based in Maple Valley, Washington began competing in the United Soccer League. Since 2013, the Eugene Emeralds baseball team logo is a Bigfoot holding a pine tree. In 2008, the Community Colleges of Spokane athletics department adopted the team name of Sasquatch and a mascot named Skitch the Sasquatch.

There are laws and ordinances regarding harming or killing Bigfoot in the state of Washington. In 1969, a law was passed that criminalized killing a Bigfoot, making the act a felony, that upon conviction was punishable by a fine of up to $10,000 or by five years imprisonment. In 1984, the law was amended to make the crime a misdemeanor and the entire county was declared a "Sasquatch refuge". Whatcom County followed suit in 1991, declaring the county a "Sasquatch Protection and Refuge Area". In 2022, Grays Harbor County, Washington, passed a similar resolution after a local elementary school in Hoquiam submitted a classroom project asking for a "Sasquatch Protection and Refuge Area" to be granted.

=== In media and the arts ===
Bigfoot is featured in various films. It is often depicted as the antagonist in low budget monster movies, but has also been depicted as intelligent and friendly, with a notable example being Harry and the Hendersons (1987). Sasquatch Sunset (2024) depicts a family of Bigfoot engaging in alleged behaviors reported by Bigfoot enthusiasts and researchers. Bigfoot is also featured in television, notably as a subject of reality and paranormal television series, with notable examples being Finding Bigfoot (2011), Mountain Monsters (2013), 10 Million Dollar Bigfoot Bounty (2014), Expedition Bigfoot (2019), and Alaskan Killer Bigfoot (2021).

Dean Mitchell is a saxophonist notable for musical performances in a Bigfoot costume, going by the stage name of Saxsquatch.

In September 2025, a Broadway theatre musical comedy entitled "Bigfoot!" created by Amber Ruffin, David Schmoll, and Kevin Sciretta was announced for an eight-week run in 2026. The musical tells the story of a Bigfoot that becomes the target of a paranoia in a small town.

=== In advocacy ===
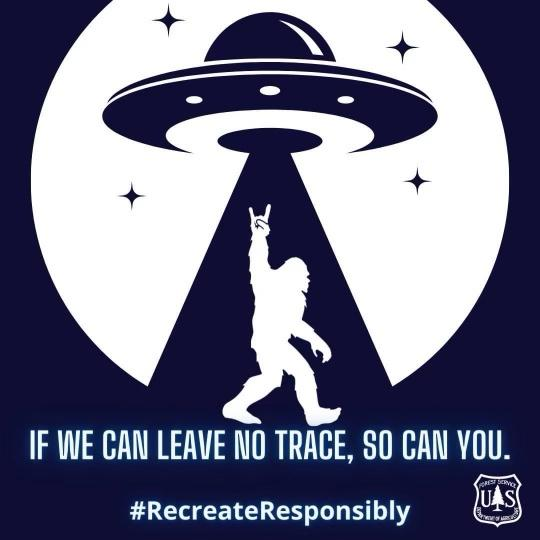
A post shared on Twitter in 2022 by the U.S. Department of Agriculture that depicts Bigfoot and a flying saucer to promote responsible conduct in national forests

Bigfoot has been used for environmental protection and nature conservation campaigns and advocacy. In the 2018 podcast Wild Thing, creator and journalist Laura Krantz argues that the concept of Bigfoot can be an important part of environmental interest and protection, stating, "If you look at it from the angle that Bigfoot is a creature that has eluded capture or hasn't left any concrete evidence behind, then you just have a group of people who are curious about the environment and want to know more about it, which isn't that far off from what naturalists have done for centuries".

Bigfoot was used in an environmental protection campaign, albeit comedically, by the U.S. Forest Service in 2015. Bigfoot is a mascot for the U.S. Fish & Wildlife Service's "Leave No Trace Principles", a national educational program to inform the public about reducing the damage caused by outdoor activities. The 360 mile "Bigfoot Trail" in Oregon, is named for the creature. Environmental organization Oregon Wild also uses Bigfoot to promote its nature advocacy, stating, "If there really is a Sasquatch out there, there is definitely more than one, and in order to maintain a healthy breeding population a species of hominid (as Sasquatch is assumed to be) would need extremely vast expanses of uninterrupted forest. Remote Wilderness areas would be prime habitat for Sasquatch, so if there are any out there to protect, making sure Oregon's forests get the protections they need to stay untrammeled is of the utmost importance".

In 2024, Bigfoot was used as a mascot for a government recycling campaign in Whitfield County, Georgia. In 2026, the Oregon state fire marshal Mariana Ruiz-Temple launched the "Wildfire Prepared: One Foot at a Time" campaign with Bigfoot as its mascot, aimed at reducing the threat of wildfires.

In 2026, Buxton, Maine featured Bigfoot on its "I Voted" sticker to encourage voter participation.

During the onset of the COVID-19 pandemic in 2020, Bigfoot became a part of many North American social distancing advocacy campaigns, with the creature being referred to as the "Social Distancing Champion" and as the subject of various Internet memes related to the pandemic.

=== Bigfoot subculture ===
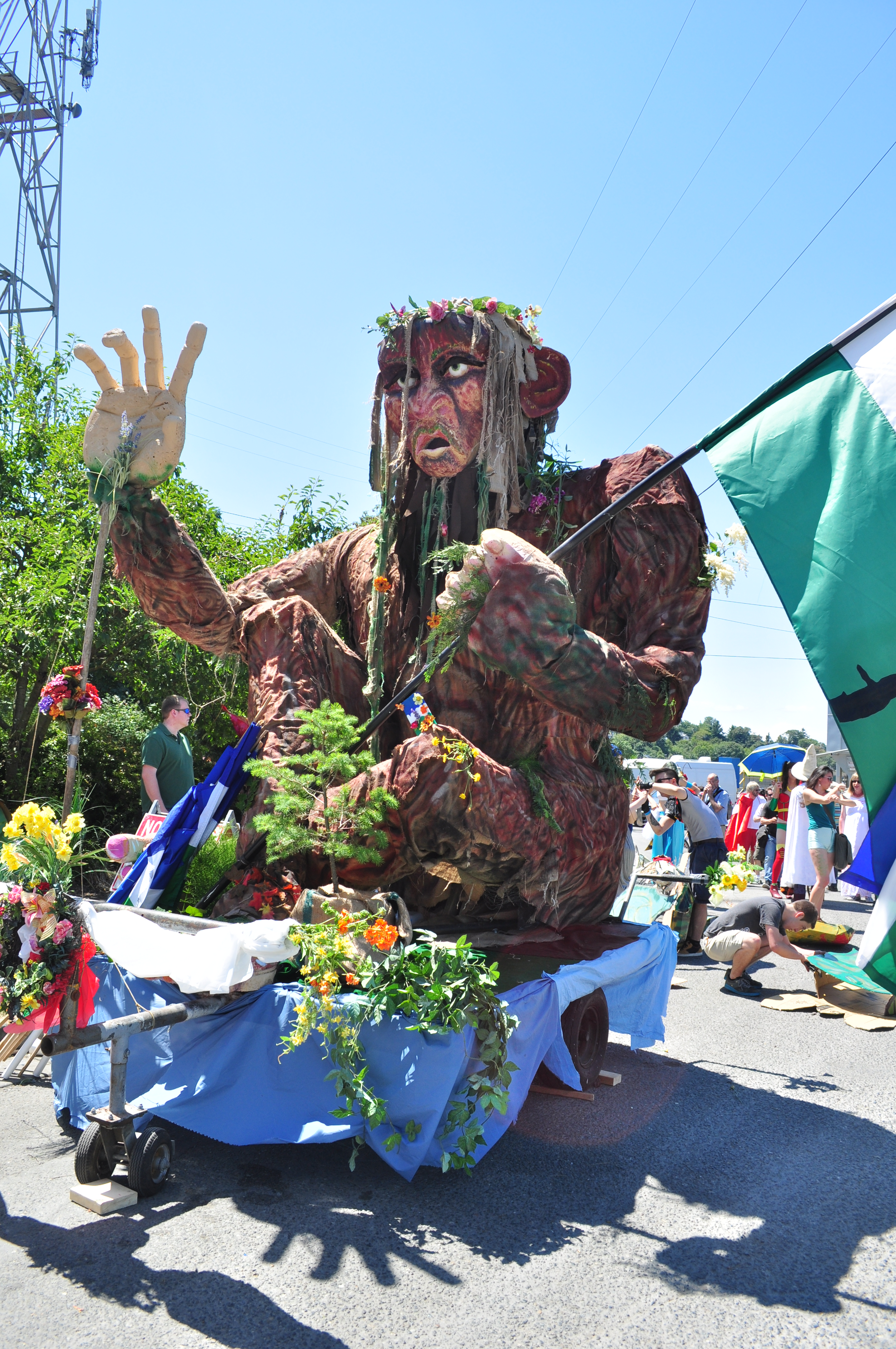
A Bigfoot-themed float at the 2015 Fremont Solstice Parade in Seattle, Washington

There is an entire subculture surrounding Bigfoot. The act of searching for the creatures is often referred to as "Squatching", "Squatchin'" or "Squatch'n", popularized by the Animal Planet series, Finding Bigfoot. Bigfoot researchers and believers are often called "Bigfooters" or "Squatchers". 20th century Bigfooters Peter C. Byrne, René Dahinden, John Green and Grover Krantz have been dubbed by cryptozoologist and author Loren Coleman as the "Four Horsemen of Sasquatchery". The 2024 book The Secret History of Bigfoot by journalist John O'Connor explores this subculture of Bigfooters, particularly the wide assortment of beliefs enthusiasts of the subject hold.

In 2004, David Fahrenthold of The Washington Post published an article describing a feud between Bigfoot researchers in the eastern and western United States. Fahrenthold writes, "On the one hand, East Coast Bigfooters say they have to fight discrimination from Western counterparts who think the creature does not live east of the Rocky Mountains. On the other, they have to deal with reports from a more urban population, which includes some who are unfamiliar with wildlife and apt to mistake a black bear for the missing link".

According to sociologists Dr. Jamie Lewis of Cardiff University and Dr. Andrew Bartlett of the University of Sheffield, who interviewed 160 Bigfoot enthusiasts over a three-year period, most Bigfooters are middle-aged white males who are often former military service members and employed in blue-collar jobs. They also indicated Bigfooters can be divided into two categories: "Apers", who believe Bigfoot is a large primate unknown to science, and "Woo-Woos", who believe Bigfoot is a supernatural being.

People have been injured or killed while searching for Bigfoot in the wilderness. On December 28, 2024, two men were found deceased in the Gifford Pinchot National Forest in Washington state after setting off on Christmas to search for Bigfoot. Their disappearance prompted a large scale search and rescue effort, with the Skamania County Sheriff's Office concluding they were likely not prepared for the inclement weather.

October 20, the anniversary of the Patterson-Gimlin film recording, is considered by some enthusiasts as "National Sasquatch Awareness Day". In 2015, World Champion taxidermist Ken Walker completed what he believes to be a lifelike Bigfoot model based on the subject in the Patterson–Gimlin film. He entered it into the 2015 World Taxidermy & Fish Carving Championships in Missouri and was the subject of Dan Wayne's 2019 documentary Big Fur.

=== Tourism and events ===
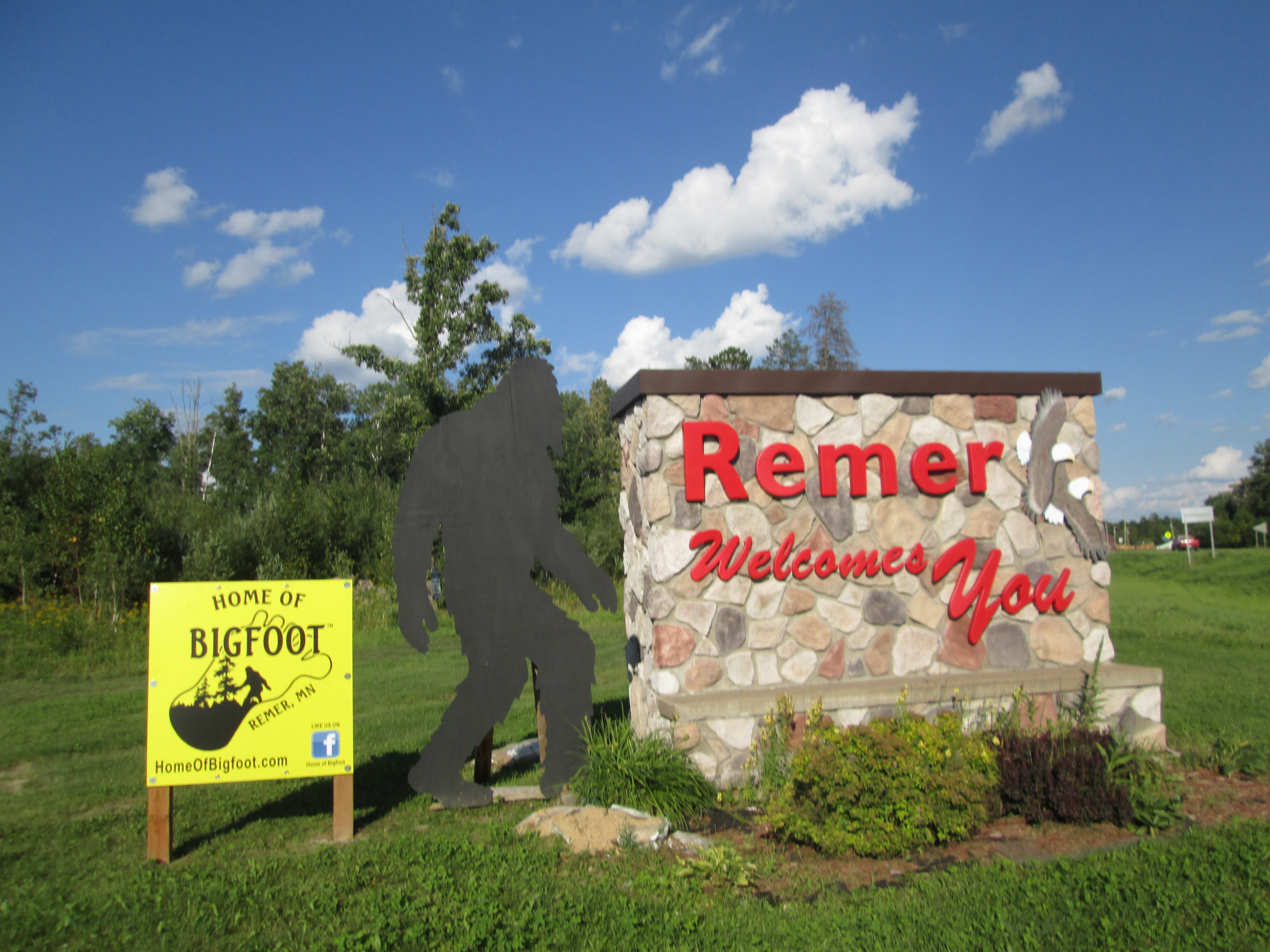
Remer, Minnesota, uses local Bigfoot folklore as a means of attracting tourism to the area.

Bigfoot and related folklore has an impact on tourism. Willow Creek, California, considers itself the "Bigfoot Capital of the World". The Willow Creek Chamber of Commerce has hosted the "Bigfoot Daze" festival annually since the 1960s, drawing on the popularity of the local folklore, notably that of the Patterson-Gimlin film. Jefferson, Texas proclaimed itself the "Bigfoot Capital of Texas" in 2018. The city has hosted the Texas Bigfoot Conference since 2000.

In 2021, Oklahoma State Representative Justin Humphrey, in an effort to bolster tourism, proposed an official Bigfoot hunting season in Oklahoma, indicating that the Oklahoma Department of Wildlife Conservation would regulate permits and the state would offer a $3 million bounty if such a creature was captured alive and unharmed. A 2017 bill proposed to recognize Sasquatch as the "official cryptid" of Washington State, while a similar bill nominated Bigfoot for California's "state cryptid". In 2024, mayor Grant Nicely of Derry, Pennsylvania declared Bigfoot the "official cryptid" of the borough and stated, "Willful harm or capture of the species will be punishable by law." Council Vice-president Nathan Bundy stated, "By proclaiming Bigfoot as our official cryptid and establishing Derry as a sanctuary, we are embracing our local folklore and the rich history that makes our community unique".

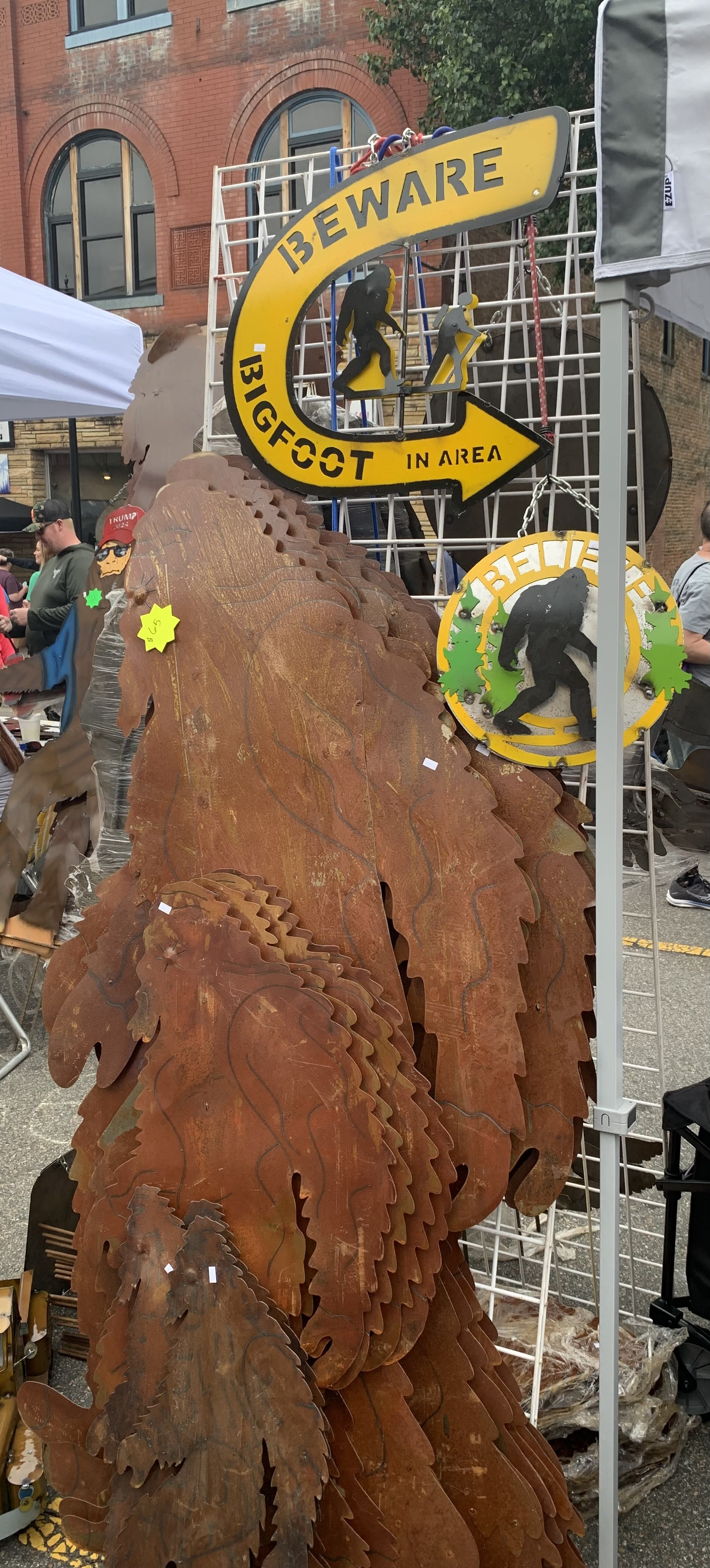
Bigfoot merchandise for sale at the WNC Bigfoot Festival in Marion, North Carolina

Events such as conferences and festivals dedicated to Bigfoot draw thousands of attendees and contribute to the economies of areas in which they are held. These events commonly include guest speakers, research and lore presentations, and sometimes live music, vendors, food trucks, and other activities such as costume contests and "Bigfoot howl" competitions. Some receive collaboration between local government and corporations, such as the Smoky Mountain Bigfoot Festival in Townsend, Tennessee, which is sponsored by Monster Energy. The 2023 Bigfoot Festival in Marion, North Carolina, saw approximately 40,000 people in attendance, resulting in a large economic boost for the small town of less than 8,000 residents. In 2025, Bigfoot was named the "official town animal" of Marion. In February 2016, the University of New Mexico at Gallup held a two-day Bigfoot conference at a cost of $7,000 in university funds.

Bigfoot is also featured in events alongside other famous cryptids such as the Loch Ness Monster, Mothman, and Chupacabra.

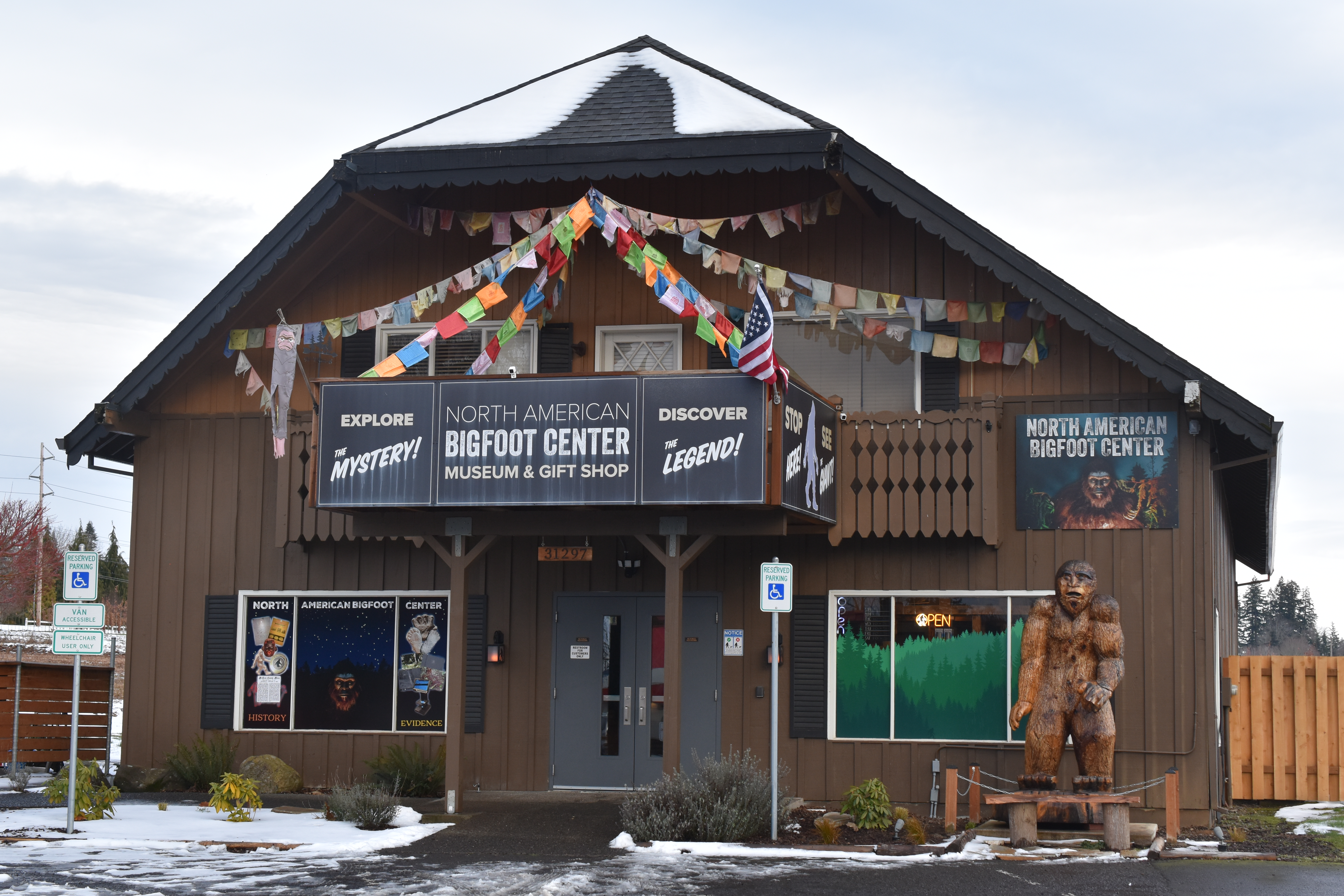
The North American Bigfoot Center in Boring, Oregon

There are museums dedicated to Bigfoot. In 2019, Bigfoot researcher Cliff Barackman, notable for his role on Finding Bigfoot, opened the North American Bigfoot Center in Boring, Oregon. In 2022, The Bigfoot Crossroads of America Museum and Research Center in Hastings, Nebraska, was selected for addition into the archives of the U.S. Library of Congress. The High Desert Museum in Bend, Oregon features an exhibit called Sensing Sasquatch, which presents the subject from an Indigenous point-of-view. According to Executive Director Dana Whitelaw, "Rather than the popular, mainstream view of Sasquatch, this exhibition shows Sasquatch as a protective entity for many Indigenous peoples of the High Desert. The exhibit reflects the reverence that Native peoples have for Sasquatch and will be centered on Indigenous art, voices and storytelling".

=== Organizations ===
There are several organizations dedicated to Bigfoot. The oldest and largest is the Bigfoot Field Researchers Organization (BFRO). The BFRO also provides a free database to individuals and other organizations. Their website includes reports from across North America that have been investigated by BFRO researchers. Other similar organizations exist throughout many U.S. states and their members come from a variety of backgrounds.

The North American Wood Ape Conservancy (NAWAC), a nonprofit organization, states its mission is to "ultimately have the wood ape species documented, protected, and the land they inhabit protected. Author Mike Mays of NAWAC states, "If just anyone hauled in a Bigfoot carcass the blowback from animal rights groups and beyond would be ruinous".

== See also ==
- Bigfoot: The Life and Times of a Legend – 2009 book published by University of Chicago Press
- Sasquatch: Legend Meets Science – 2003 film documentary aired on Discovery Channel
- Sasquatch: Legend Meets Science – 2006 book published by Forge
- The Secret History of Bigfoot – 2024 book about the culture of Bigfoot hunters by Sourcebooks

Similar alleged creatures

- Almas – Central Asia
- Am Fear Liath Mòr – United Kingdom
- Amomongo – Philippines
- Barmanou – Afghanistan/Pakistan
- Bukit Timah Monkey Man – Singapore
- Ebu Gogo – Indonesia
- Fouke Monster – United States
- Hibagon – Japan
- Mande Barung – India
- Mistapew – Algonquinian cultures
- Momo the Monster – United States
- Nittaewo – Sri Lanka
- Orang Mawas – Malaysia
- Orang Pendek – Indonesia
- Sisimito - Central America
- Skunk ape – United States
- Urayuli – United States, Canada
- Wild Man of the Navidad
- Yeren – China
- Yeti – Asia
- Yowie – Australia
