= Shooting Bigfoot =

- Directed by: Morgan Matthews
- Produced by: Ben Chanan; Jo Hughes; Morgan Matthews; Tara Nolan
- Starring: Morgan Matthews; Tom Biscardi; Wayne Burton; Rick Dyer; Dallas Gilbert
- Edited by: Ben Chanan
- Music by: Sam Hooper
- Production company: Minnow Films
- Release date: April 30, 2013
- Running time: 90 minutes
- Country: United Kingdom
- Language: English

Shooting Bigfoot: America's Monster Hunters is a 2013 British documentary directed by Morgan Matthews. It follows Matthews as he travels to America to spend time with four amateur Bigfoot hunters.

== Premise ==
Morgan Matthews explains that since he was a child he had an interest in Bigfoot. He travels to America and meets with Bigfoot hunters Dallas Gilbert and Wayne Burton in Ohio, Rick Dyer in Texas, and Tom Biscardi in California.

During the film Matthews goes on Bigfoot hunts with each hunter and discusses the history of hoaxing in the world of Bigfoot hunting.

== Cast ==
- Morgan Matthews
- Tom Biscardi
- Wayne Burton
- Rick Dyer
- Dallas Gilbert

== Release ==
Shooting Bigfoot premiered at the Hot Docs film festival in Toronto and aired as part of the 2013 Edinburgh International Film Festival, and was released in April of the same year.

== Reception ==
Drew Taylor from IndieWire gave Shooting Bigfoot an A−, calling it "riotously entertaining", and praising Matthews' dry approach.
