= Alaskan Killer Bigfoot =

- Genre: Documentary; Reality; Adventure; Travel
- Directed by: Brian Kniffel
- Starring: Keith Seville; Noah Craig; DJ Brewster; Kyle McDowell
- Country of origin: United States
- Original language: English
- No. of seasons: 1
- No. of episodes: 8

Production
- Executive producers: French Horwitz; Brian Kniffel; Sarah T. Davies; Mark Koops
- Production location: Kenai Peninsula Borough
- Cinematography: Alex Weisman
- Running time: 45 Minutes

Original release
- Network: Discovery+
- Release: December 7, 2021 – January 18, 2022

Alaskan Killer Bigfoot is an American television series on Discovery+. It premiered December 7, 2021. The series follows a team of four men: Keith Seville, Noah Craig, DJ Brewster, and Kyle McDowell as they explore Portlock, Alaska, an uninhabited town in which natives were allegedly driven from over 70 years ago by a creature called Nantinaq.

== Premise ==
The town of Portlock, Alaska, was established in the 19th century as a cannery, particularly for salmon. However, in the 1940s, Portlock became a ghost town, as a terrifying bigfoot-like creature known as Nantinaq chased all the villagers out. Over the course of the series, a team of four men: Keith Seville, Noah Craig, DJ Brewster, and Kyle McDowell camped out around Portlock and the Port Chatham area looking for Nantinaq. During the exploration, the team is assisted by Portlock descendants Tommy Evans and Frank “Guy” Berestoff.

== Episodes ==
No.	Title	Original release date
1	"Village of the Damned"	December 7, 2021
A sense of foreboding hangs in the air as the team arrives in Portlock.
2	"It Knows We're Here"	December 7, 2021
The team discovers unsettling evidence of Nantinaq's hunting habits.
3	"An Unhappy Medium"	December 14, 2021
A psychic joins the expedition to build a spiritual bridge to Nantinaq.
4	"S.O.S."	December 21, 2021
The team broadcasts Bigfoot vocal recordings to draw out Nantinaq.
5	"You Have a Bigfoot Here"	December 28, 2021
The team's evidence points to a Bigfoot infestation in Portlock.
6	"Camp Terror"	January 4, 2022
Nantinaq stages a brutal attack on base camp in the middle of the night.
7	"We're the Prey"	January 11, 2022
The team learns more about shipwrecks near Portlock as on land, Nantinaq is becoming more threatening, and may be lurking in the water.
8	"Nantinaq's Exorcism"	January 18, 2022
The team performs a cleansing ceremony to banish Nantinaq from Portlock.
