= Sierra Sounds =

Alleged audio recording of Bigfoot

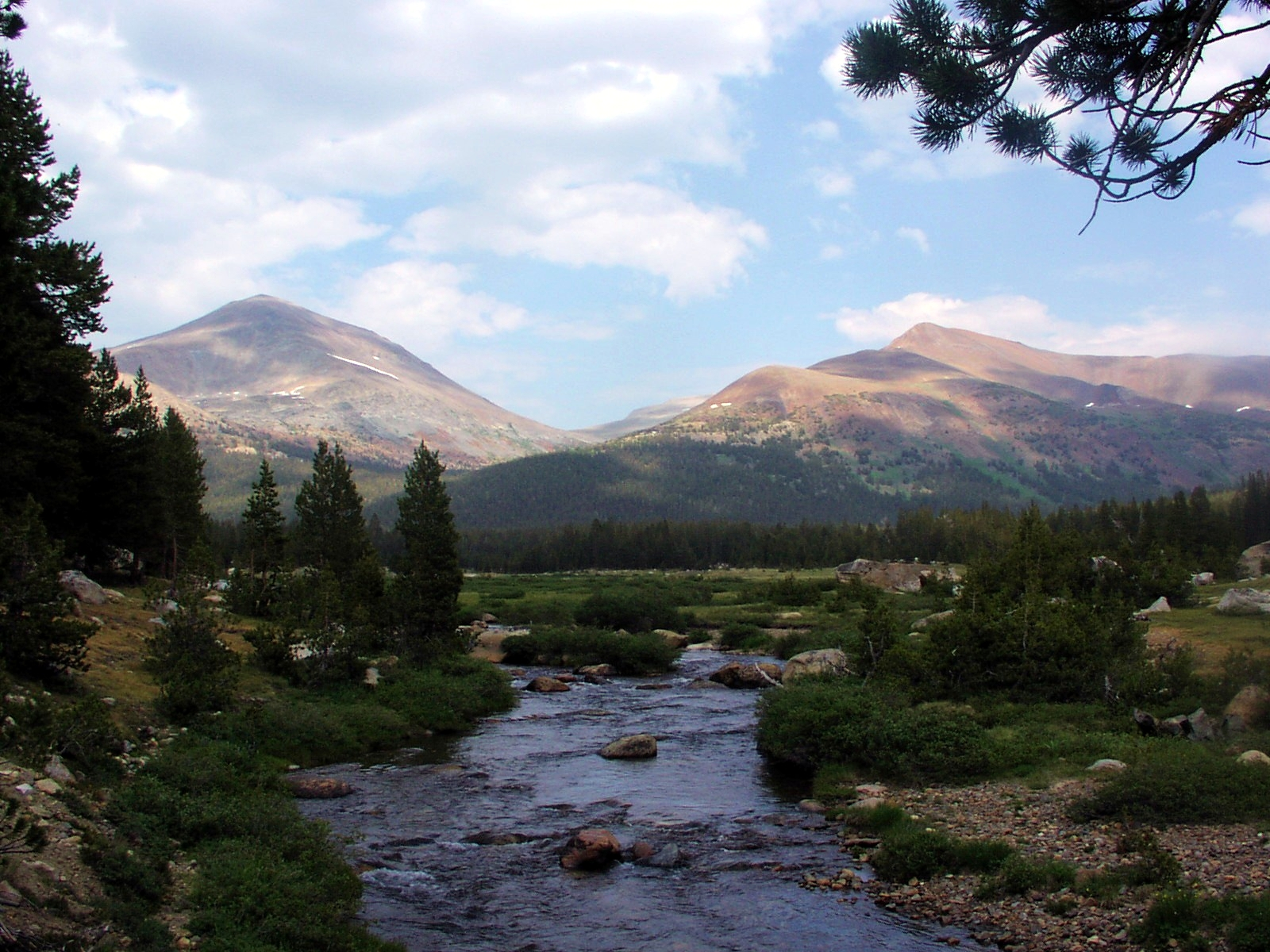
View of the Tuolumne River in the Sierras. Morehead and Berry have not disclosed the exact location where they obtained their recordings.

The Sierra Sounds are audio recordings made by Ron Morehead and Alan R. "Al" Berry, allegedly capturing Bigfoot vocalizations in the Sierra Nevada mountains beginning in 1972. Morehead produced and released the recordings on CD and cassette as The Bigfoot Recordings Volume 1 (1996) and The Bigfoot Recordings Volume 2 (2003). Enthusiasts of Bigfoot commonly reference the recordings as among the most compelling evidence for the existence of Bigfoot, though scientific consensus maintains Bigfoot remains firmly within the pseudoscience of cryptozoology and is not a real creature.

== Overview ==
In 1971, Ron Morehead and Alan R. "Al" Berry, a reporter at the Redding Record Searchlight, went camping in the Sierra Nevada mountains, seeking evidence for the existence of Bigfoot. Morehead described himself as a researcher and believer in Bigfoot. In contrast, Berry was a skeptic looking for evidence of a hoax.

In the audio recordings made from within their campsite in 1972, Morehead and Berry can be heard quietly talking to each other before distant howls are heard. Morehead and Berry call back to the unknown source, attempting to mimic the howls themselves. Various vocalizations can be heard at a distance, including howls, grunts, and knocking sounds. The most controversial vocalizations are what Morehead describes as a supposed form of language, dubbed by many as "samurai chatter" due to its perceived resemblance to the dialogue of old Japanese samurai films.

In 1975, Chuck Lawson, the owner of a Redding recording studio, released a 45 RPM record incorporating Berry's 1972 recordings. The Side A track "The Legend of Bigfoot" was written and sung by Lawson and the Side B track "Bigfoot Blast" features over three minutes of "animal bellowings and gruntings" supplied by Berry.

Morehead produced and released The Bigfoot Recordings Volume 1 in 1996 and The Bigfoot Recordings Volume 2 in 2003. The first volume features recordings originally made by Berry in 1972; the second volume was recorded by Morehead in 1974. Both volumes have a runtime of 40 minutes.

== Analysis and aftermath ==
Scientific consensus argues the existence of Bigfoot is not credible, and such stories are more plausibly explained as hoaxes, folklore, misidentification, or other mundane factors. No studies have been conducted on the Sierra Sounds in mainstream scholarly sources, though Morehead insists that the legend of Bigfoot warrants scientific consideration.

In 1975, Berry sent a 15-minute recording to Dr. Vaughn Bryant Jr., an anthropologist and botanist at Texas A&M University, who said the vocalizations sounded "similar to those of primates". He also sent recordings to Dr. Lynn Kirlin, an electronics expert at the University of Wyoming, who "concluded that the tapes had not been doctored".

Scott Nelson, a retired U.S. Navy cryptographic linguist, analyzed the Sierra Sounds recordings after coming across them online while helping his young son with a school project. Self-described as "not a Bigfoot guy" before hearing the recordings, Nelson said he was fascinated by the Sierra Sounds and concluded they represented a language that is not human in origin and was not hoaxed or faked.

Al Berry died in 2012. According to Morehead's blog, Berry maintained "it would have made the story even more interesting if he could have discovered how anyone could have pulled this off" by faking the Sierra Sounds. Morehead asserts the recordings are legitimate, and described himself as an "adventurist" on his personal blog. He remains involved in the community of Bigfoot believers.

In a 2013 blog post for Scientific American, linguist and researcher Karen Stollznow stated that the Sierra Sounds "are touted as the gold-standard of evidence for a Bigfoot language" and that the recordings "are used not only to support the claim of a Bigfoot language, but also to legitimize claims of Bigfoot's existence." She said the recordings are a "combination of hoax and misidentification".
