= Painted Rock (Tulare County, California) =

Archaeological and sacred site in California, US

CA-TUL-19
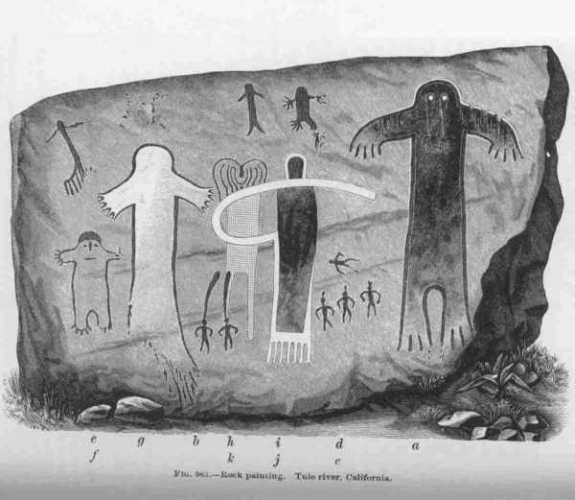
- Hoffman's 1882 sketch of the rock art seen at the site.
- Interactive map of CA-TUL-19
- Location: Tule River Reservation, Tulare County, California, United States
- Nearest city: Porterville, California
- Coordinates: 36°1′53″N 118°42′54″W
- Governing body: Tule River Indian Tribe of the Tule River Reservation

Painted Rock is an archaeological and sacred site of the Yokuts of the Tule River Indian Tribe of the Tule River Reservation in Tulare County, California. Painted Rock contains petroglyphs visited and described by Walter James Hoffman in 1882 and by Clinton Hart Merriam in 1903. One image on the panel has been interpreted by cryptozoologists as "an entire Bigfoot family".

== Sources ==
- Strain, Kathy Moskowitz (2012). "Mayak Datat: The Hairy Man Pictographs" (PDF). The Relict Hominoid Inquiry. 1. Idaho State University: 1–12. ISSN 2165-770X.
