= Bigfoot Discovery Museum =

Coordinates: 37.0415°N 122.0726°W

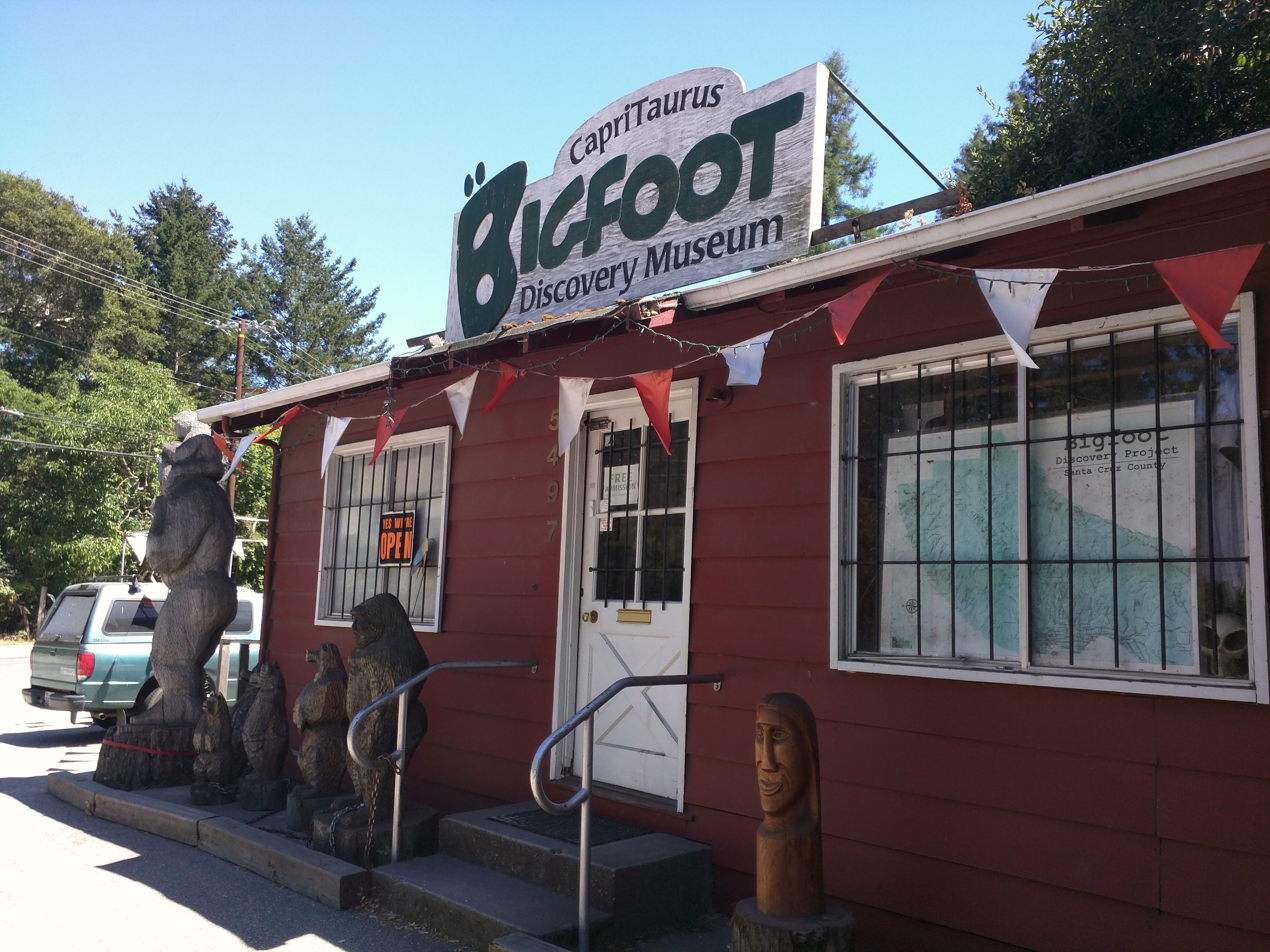
Exterior view of museum, June 2016

Bigfoot Discovery Museum is a museum in Felton, California devoted to Bigfoot (also known as Sasquatch). The founder, Michael Rugg, graduated from Stanford University in 1968, worked in Silicon Valley until the dot-com bust, then opened the museum in 2004 or 2005. Paula Yarr is listed as a co-founder. The museum features tchotchkes from the 1970s Bigfoot boom, and the 1980s resurrection with Harry and the Hendersons memorabilia.
