= The Secret History of Bigfoot =

2024 book by John O'Conner about Bigfooters

The Secret History of Bigfoot: Field Notes on a North American Monster
- Cover of the first edition
- Author: John O'Connor
- Language: English
- Subject: Bigfoot, Cryptids
- Publisher: Sourcebooks
- Publication date: February 6, 2024
- Publication place: United States
- Media type: Print (hardcover, audiobook and Kindle)
- Pages: 304
- ISBN: 978-1464216633

The Secret History of Bigfoot: Field Notes on a North American Monster is a 2024 book by journalist John O'Connor that examines the culture of Bigfoot researchers and enthusiasts. The book was published by Sourcebooks.

== Synopsis ==
Journalist John O'Connor, curious about the people who search for Bigfoot, called "Bigfooters", travels across the United States conducting interviews. He attends Bigfoot conferences, goes on excursions, and interviews psychologists about the phenomenon of Bigfoot research. What he discovers is that there is a wide range of belief in this subculture; some he describes as "credulous" people who have gone down the rabbit-hole of pseudoscientific cryptozoology and others that are critical thinkers who have a "prove it to me" mentality. The goal of the book is not to provide evidence for or against Bigfoot, but to explore the community of Bigfooters.

== Background ==
O'Connor left his home in Cambridge, Massachusetts during the onset of the COVID-19 pandemic in 2020. He started at Mount St. Helens in the North Cascades region because of the "rich history of Bigfoot sightings". To get an understanding of Bigfoot hunting across the US after leaving the Pacific Northwest, he went to Oregon, Kentucky, Texas "hiking and camping along the way". O'Connor when asked why he as a journalist that normally focuses on travel and food would write a book about Bigfooters, he answered that he was interested in author Peter Matthiessen, who wrote the book The Snow Leopard', and his interest in Bigfoot; O'Connor decided to "follow up on" what Matthiessen did. When asked what his favorite Bigfoot story was, O'Connor indicated it is the Patterson–Gimlin film because the story became iconic and gave society the indelible image of Bigfoot. O'Connor felt that he tried very hard not to inject his own opinion in the book though it does become more discernible further in the book, his goal was to learn what drives Bigfooters to continue to believe. He says he "totally understands people's desire to believe in Bigfoot", but that we need to be "governed by reason and rationality and fact-based reality and science and Bigfoot doesn't hold up well there, unfortunately".

Part of the reason O'Connor wanted to write this book was because he enjoys interacting with people and wanted to travel to places he hadn't spent much time in before, the Pacific Northwest, Arkansas and Kentucky. The book began as a screenplay, working with a friend, the idea of Bigfoot "got thrown out for some reason and it stuck". The screenplay he claimed was pretty bad though it was very similar to Max Brooks book Devolution which also started out as a screenplay. There just seemed to be "something in the air about homicidal Bigfoots" around 2018. Learning that Matthiessen had been working on a book on Bigfoot when he died in 2014, someone whom O'Connor respected, it felt like even though O'Connor considers himself to be a skeptic Matthiessen's involvement "gave him permission" to revisit the idea of writing a book about Bigfooters. O'Connor found it strange that no journalists had looked at Bigfooters across the country as a whole. His book publisher managed to sell the idea which came as a bit of a surprise to O'Connor.

O'Connor wasn't interested in Bigfoot so much as he was interested in Bigfooters, it became difficult to leave his skepticism behind and just allow the stories of the people involved come out. Biddle asked O'Connor what kind of reception did he get when contacting the Bigfooters, O'Connor responded that as an outsider and non-Bigfooter "people were overwhelmingly open and nice". Generally people like to tell their stories, and with that comes as a journalist "a lot of responsibility". O'Connor was surprised at how much critical thinking actually goes on in Bigfooting, cognitive biases and questioning evidence, he had "expected tin-foil hats". There are wide gulfs between Bigfooters, some believe in interdimensional Bigfoots but the majority seem to believe in "flesh and blood Bigfoot" but it is sometimes hard to pin down Bigfooters on what they actually believe. "Just to be clear, most Bigfooters that I met were conversant in woo, but I think the majority were wouldn't totally cop to a belief in that stuff. ... I don't think that any of my subjects were stupid or dishonest ... but once you open this door ... you can very quickly tumble down this rabbit hole, to not have any guardrails, what you are willing to accept, it can be a real shady path ... people get caught up in that without realizing what is happening."

== Reception ==
Journalist Virginia Heffernan writes that O'Connor is likeable and funny, and writes vividly about the characters he encounters in the woods calling the scenes, "stunners" and that O'Connor is insightful in describing the "Bigfooters to other kinds of trackers". He left his home in Cambridge where he was a stay-at-home father during the 2020 COVID lockdown to trek in the woods "where men are men, go unmasked and hope for moral redemption by Sasquatch". Heffernan states that O'Connor "lapses into laziness when comparing Bigfoot fixation to Trumpism. Both, he says, are 'an expression of white anxiety and fear mixed with nostalgia for an imagined American past.' A wallop of defeatism hits the prose: The same can and has been said of every culture at the moment of its colonization".

Author Carl Hoffman says that there is a lot of "myth and imagination" in the book and though O'Connor travels from "Maine to Washington state to Texas to Massachusetts" and multiple Bigfoot conferences, the Bigfooters he interacts with are frustrating. They "come across as overgrown adolescent nitwits desperate for fellowship and purpose, who seem to have lost the ability to parse truth from fiction, the real from the imagined, and seem incapable of metaphor." O'Connor comparing these mostly middle-aged White men to lovers of QAnon and Donald Trump. Hoffman writes that this "is no fun at all and gets tedious quickly". Also Hoffman dislikes O'Connor's use of what Hoffman calls "adolescent asides" calling them also "tedious".

Gabino Iglesias, a self-described lover of all things Bigfoot, writing for NPR states that he felt that The Secret History of Bigfoot "is a wonderful book about one of the most ubiquitous myths in the U.S." and that O'Connor celebrates "of one of the weirdest subcultures we have and a narrative that fully embraces the fact that we sometimes need to believe in something that's bigger and freer than us." Iglesias warns readers that they will not find evidence for or against Bigfoot in this book, and this book does not make Bigfooters look like fools, but is an "immersive journey" into the culture "but also a deep, honest, heartfelt look at the people who obsess about, the meaning of its myth's lingering appeal, and the psychology behind it. ... The result is one of the most compelling nonfiction books you'll read this year."

== Author biography ==
In conversation with paranormal investigators Kenny Biddle and Daniel Reed, O'Connor stated that he grew up in Kalamazoo, Michigan until he went to college at the University of Michigan where he got his degree. After college he moved to the east coast of the United States, in New York he got a master's degree and while writing this book he resided in Boston. The last fifteen years he has been a working freelance journalist. He teaches a journalism class part-time at a Boston college, food-writing and journalism on drugs.

== Release details ==
- O'Connor, John (2024). The Secret History of Bigfoot: Field Notes on a North American Monster (1st edition (hardcover) ed.). Sourcebooks. ISBN 978-1464216633. 304 pages.
