= Tom Biscardi =

Cryptozoology enthusiast (born 1941)

Thomas Biscardi
- Born: Carmine Thomas Biscardi; 1948 (age 77–78); United States

Carmine Thomas Biscardi (born 1948) is a cryptozoology enthusiast, Las Vegas promoter, internet radio host, and film producer. He describes himself as the "Real Bigfoot Hunter". Biscardi has been centrally involved in several hoaxes regarding Bigfoot that have garnered widespread international media attention.

== Biography ==
On his website, Biscardi writes, "I was watching Johnny Carson in 1967, and I saw the first 8mm footage that Roger Patterson took of the Bluff Creek incident. I said to myself, 'How the hell can we send a man to the moon, but we can't find this creature'." Biscardi got his start in the late 60s and early 70s when he met and was mentored by Ivan Marx, another well known Bigfoot hoaxer of the time. In 1981, Biscardi produced a documentary called In the Shadow of Bigfoot. It contained old Ivan Marx footage of the same pointy-headed, pointy-eared alleged Bigfoot seen in the earlier Marx films. Most of the Bigfoot community regarded it as laughably fake. He is the current CEO and founder of BIGFOOT Projects Investments Inc, which filed for an IPO in 2013.

Besides Bigfoot, Biscardi has investigated sightings of the Lizard Man of Scape Ore Swamp.

Biscardi appears in the documentaries Not Your Typical Bigfoot Movie (2008) and Shooting Bigfoot (2013), which focus on the search for Bigfoot in Ohio.

== 2005 hoax ==
On July 14, 2005, Biscardi appeared on the radio program Coast to Coast AM and claimed he was "98% sure" his group would be able to capture a Bigfoot near Happy Camp, California. On August 19, he returned to say he knew of the location of a captured Bigfoot specimen, and that he would air footage of the creature through a $14 web-cam service. However, on the day the footage was to be distributed, Biscardi claimed he was "hoodwinked" by a woman in Stagecoach, Nevada, and that the specimen did not exist. Coast to Coast AM host George Noory demanded that Biscardi refund the money to people who had paid for the web-cam subscription. Biscardi then offered a refund on his website to those who had subscribed for the service after August 19.

== 2008 hoax ==
In August 2008, Matthew Whitton and Rick Dyer of Georgia announced that they had discovered the carcass of a 7-foot-7-inch, 500-pound Bigfoot-like creature while hiking through the northern mountains of their state. They said they had placed the body in a freezer in an undisclosed location. They also claimed to have seen three similar creatures when they found the body. Biscardi teamed up with Whitton and Dyer to promote the claim that they had a Bigfoot corpse, and promised the media DNA evidence. The three held a press conference in Palo Alto, California, where they showed photographs of the alleged creature. Whitton boasted, "Everyone who has talked down to us is going to eat their words." Biscardi also tried to reassure the media of the corpse's authenticity, saying, "Last weekend, I touched it, I measured its feet, I felt its intestines."

Whitton and Dyer have since admitted that it was a rubber costume.

Whitton, a police officer in Clayton County, Georgia, put his career in jeopardy after participating in the hoax. Clayton County Police Chief Jeff Turner said, "Once he perpetrated a fraud, that goes into his credibility and integrity. He has violated the duty of a police officer." Biscardi claimed that he was deceived, and that he was seeking justice.
