= Crystal Creek Reservoir =

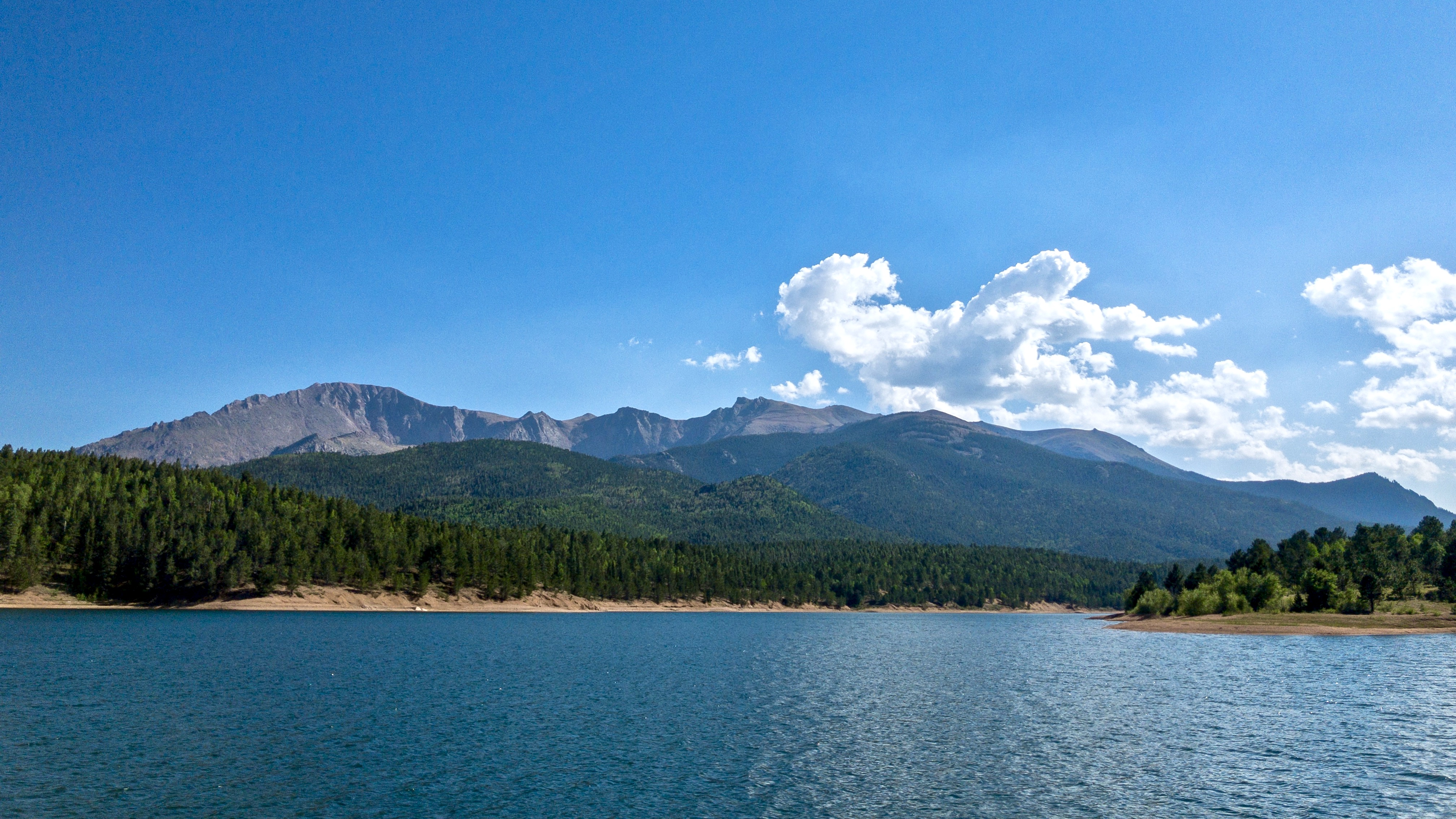

- Location within Colorado Location within the United States
- Location: El Paso County, Colorado
- Coordinates: 38.916222°N 105.030579°W
- Type: reservoir
- Primary inflows: Crystal Creek
- Primary outflows: Crystal Creek
- Basin countries: United States
- Surface area: 136 acres (55 ha)
- Shore length^{1}: 3.31 miles (5.33 km)
- Surface elevation: 9,230 feet (2,810 m)
- ^{1} Shore length is not a well-defined measure.

Crystal Creek Reservoir is a reservoir on Crystal Creek on the northwest side of Pikes Peak in El Paso County, Colorado. The reservoir is impounded by Crystal Creek Dam, which is on the border of Teller and El Paso counties. The reservoir and surrounding Pike National Forest land offers opportunities for boating, fishing, camping, and hunting, among other activities and can be accessed from the Pikes Peak Highway. It is one of three reservoirs that are part of the North Slope Recreation Area located northeast of Colorado Springs. On July 20, 2023 a rare EF-1 tornado developed rapidly on the north slope of Pikes Peak and crossed directly through the reservoir.

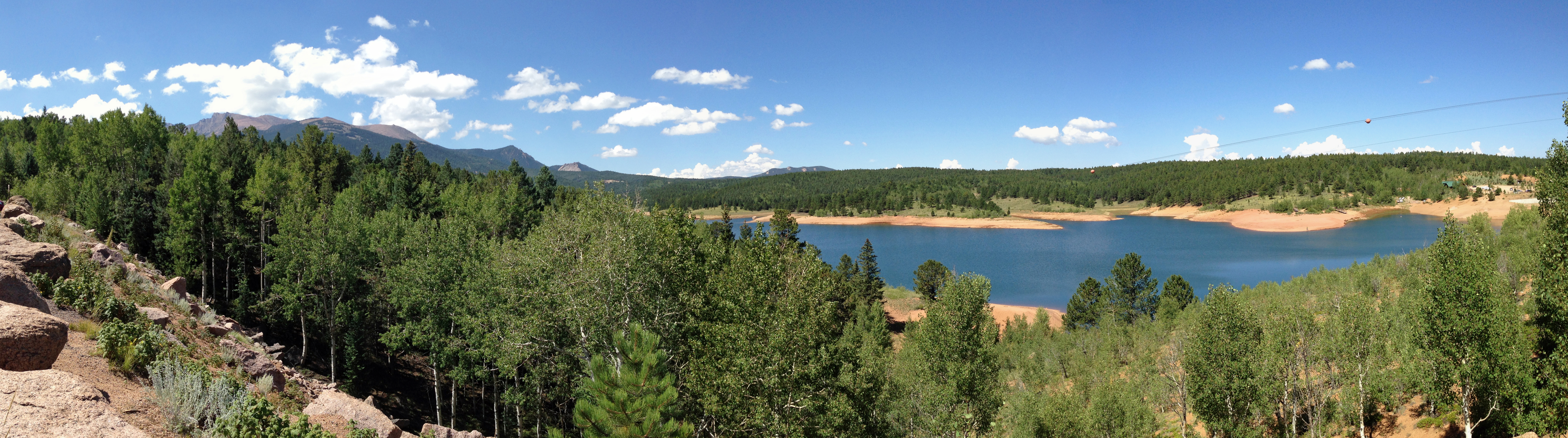
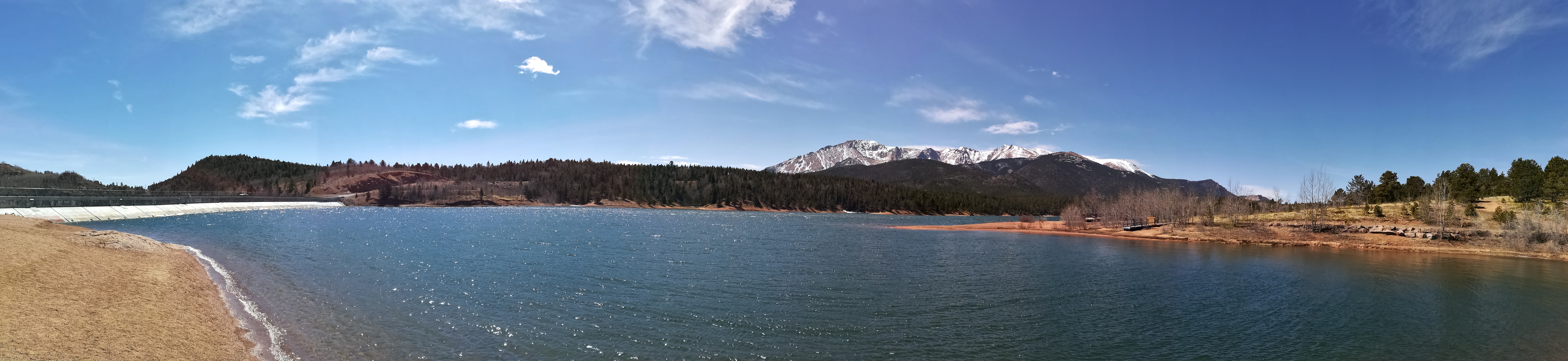
A photo of Crystal Creek Reservoir with Pikes Peak in the background in April
