= Collings Mountain =

Mountain summit in Oregon, U.S.

Coordinates: 42.0492237°N 123.1513422°W

Collings Mountain is a summit in the U.S. state of Oregon. The elevation is 3,612 feet (1,101 m).

Collings Mountain was named after an early settler.
