= Portlock, Alaska =

Ghost town in Alaska, US

Portlock
- Ghost town
- Location within the state of Alaska
- Coordinates: 59°12′52″N 151°44′46″W
- Country: United States
- State: Alaska
- Elevation: 36 ft (11 m)
- Time zone: UTC-9 (Alaska (AKST))
  - Summer (DST): UTC-8 (AKDT)

Portlock (Sugpiaq: Arrulaa'ik) is a ghost town in the US state of Alaska, located on the southern edge of the Kenai Peninsula, around 16 miles (26 km) south of Seldovia. It is located in Port Chatham bay, from which an adjacent community takes its name. Named after Nathaniel Portlock, the town was an active cannery community in the early 20th century.

== History ==
=== Establishment ===
Portlock was established in the Kenai Peninsula in the early 20th century as a cannery, particularly for salmon. It is thought to have been named after Captain Nathaniel Portlock, a British ship captain who sailed there in 1786. In 1921, a United States Post Office opened in the town. The population largely consisted of Russian-Aleuts.

=== Abandonment ===
After the construction of Alaska Route 1, Portlock, along with other towns, was abandoned in favor of communities along the opposite edge of the Kenai Peninsula that were accessible via the highway and, therefore, mainland Alaska. While some stories connected the town's abandonment with a local forest spirit Nantiinaq (sometimes associated with Bigfoot), the accounts emerged decades later, in the 2000s. These were later reported to be fabricated. Official records indicate that the town's post office closed between 1950 and 1951, marking its formal abandonment.

=== Post abandonment ===
Most of the people who left Portlock in the 1940s moved to the nearby Native Alaskan villages of Nanwalek and Port Graham. The village of Nanwalek still maintains private ownership of Portlock today. In recent years, the community has considered the possibility of re-establishing Portlock as a village.

== Nearby communities ==
Portlock was located adjacent to another community known as Port Chatham (which takes its name from Port Chatham bay). Seldovia is located c. 16 miles (26 km) north of Portlock; a chromite mining camp, known as Chrome, was also located near Portlock, which operated in the early-twentieth century.

== Demographics ==
Historical population
Census	Pop.	Note	%±
1940	31		—
1980	31		—
U.S. Decennial Census

Portlock first appeared on the 1940 U.S. Census as an unincorporated village of 31 residents. It would not report again on the census until 1980, when it was made a census-designated place (CDP), again reporting 31 residents. It was dissolved as a CDP by the 1990 census and has not reported again.

== In popular culture ==
In the spring of 2021, Discovery+ filmed a reality television series in Portlock. The series, Alaskan Killer Bigfoot, follows a scout team exploring the ruins of the abandoned village. Alaskan Killer Bigfoot premiered on Discovery+ on December 7, 2021. It made its linear cable television debut on Travel Channel on June 26, 2022.
