= Barmanou =

Humanoid cryptid from northern Pakistan and Afghanistan

Barbandu
Creature information
- Other name(s): Barmanu, Baddmanus, Big Hairy One (Translation)
- Grouping: Cryptid
- Sub grouping: Hominid
- Similar entities: Bigfoot, Skunk Ape, Yeren, Yowie, Mande Barung, Orang Pendek, Almas, Yeti

Origin
- Country: Afghanistan and Pakistan
- Region: Chitral, Gilgit and Northwestern Areas of Pakistan
- Details: Found in the mountains

The Barmanou (or Barmanu or Baddmanus) is a bipedal humanoid primate cryptid that is said to inhabit the mountainous region of northern Afghanistan and Pakistan. Shepherds living in the mountains have reported sightings.

The Barmanou is analogous to the Bigfoot of North America. The term Barmanou originates in Khowar, but is now used in several Afghan and Pakistani languages including Urdu, Shina, Pashto, and Kashmiri. In addition to the name Barmanou, there are a few local variant names.

The proposed range of the Barmanou covers the Chitral and Karakoram Ranges, between the Pamirs and the Himalayas. This places the Barmanou between the ranges of two more famous cryptids, the Almas of Central Asia and the Yeti of the Himalayas.

The Barmanou allegedly possesses both human and apelike characteristics, and has a reputation for abducting women and attempting to mate with them. It is also reported to wear animal skins upon its back and head. The Barmanou appears in the folklore of the northern regions of Pakistan, and depending on where the stories come from, it is described as an ape or a wild man.

The first search in Pakistan for a bipedal humanoid man was carried out by a Spanish zoologist living in France, Jordi Magraner, from 1987 to 1990. He wrote a paper titled Les Hominidés reliques d'Asie Centrale, on the Pakistani cryptid – the wild man.

He later researched the Barmanou extensively in the 1990s, but was murdered in Afghanistan in 2002. Loren Coleman wrote that he "collected more than fifty firsthand sighting accounts, and all eyewitnesses recognized the reconstruction of Heuvelman's homo pongoides ["apelike man"—i.e., a living Neanderthal.]. They picked out homo pongoides as their match to Barmanu from Magraner's ID kit of drawings of apes, fossil men, aboriginals, monkeys, and the Minnesota Iceman."

In May 1994, during a search in the Shishikoh valley, Chitral, cryptozoologists Jordi Magraner, Anne Mallasseand, and another associate reported that they heard unusual guttural sounds late one evening, and it was alleged that only a primitive voice box could have produced these vocalizations. Reportedly, no further progress could be made in pursuing the sounds to their source due to the late hour.

== See also ==
- Am Fear Liath Mòr – Scotland, United Kingdom
- Amomongo – Philippines
- Daeva or Div – Tajikistan, Iran
- Fouke Monster – United States
- Hibagon – Japan
- Mapinguari – South America
- Menk, Russia
- Momo the Monster – United States
- Orang Mawas – Malaysia
- Yeren – China
- Yeti – Himalayas
