= Yeti =

Mythical ape-like creature from Asia

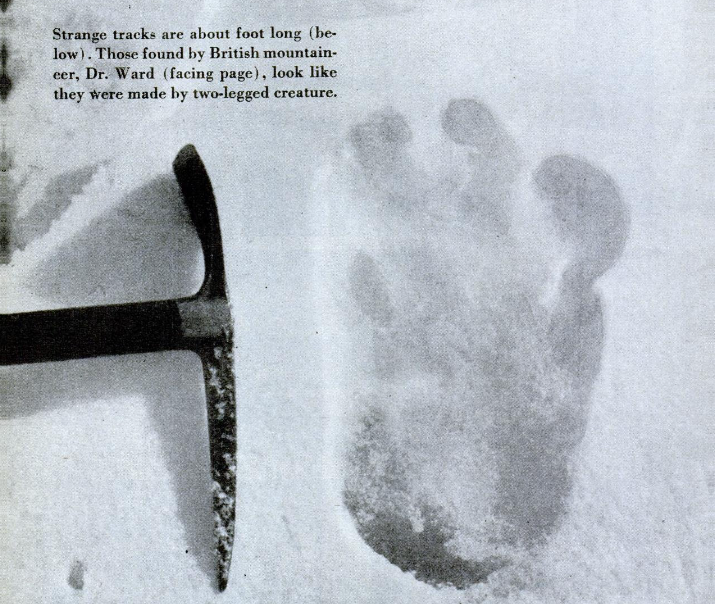
- Photograph of an alleged yeti footprint taken at Menlung glacier on the Everest expedition by Eric Shipton, 1951

Creature information
- Other names: Abominable Snowman; Meh-teh
- Similar entities: Almas; Barmanou; Basajaun; Bigfoot; Hibagon; Mande Barung; Orang Pendek; Skunk ape; Yeren; Yowie
- Folklore: Cryptid

Origin
- Country: Bhutan; China; India; Nepal; Russia (Siberia)
- Region: Tibet, Himalayas

The Yeti (/ˈjɛti/), also commonly referred to as the Abominable Snowman in Western popular culture, is a large, hairy, mythical humanoid creature said to inhabit the Himalayan mountain range in Asia. Many dubious articles have been offered in an attempt to prove the existence of the Yeti, including anecdotal visual sightings, disputed video recordings, photographs, and plaster casts of large footprints. Some of these are speculated or known to be hoaxes.

Folklorists trace the origin of the Yeti to a combination of factors, including Sherpa folklore and misidentified fauna such as bear or yak. The Yeti is commonly compared to Bigfoot of North America as the two subjects often have similar physical descriptions.

== Description ==
The Yeti is often described as being a large, bipedal human or ape-like creature that is covered with brown, grey, or white hair, and it is sometimes depicted as having large, sharp teeth.

== Etymology and alternative names ==
The word Yeti is derived from Tibetan: གཡའ་དྲེད་, Wylie: g.ya' dred, ZWPY: Yachê, a compound of the words Tibetan: གཡའ་, Wylie: g.ya', ZWPY: ya "rocky", "rocky place" and (Tibetan: དྲེད་, Wylie: dred, ZWPY: chê) "bear". Pranavananda states that the words "ti", "te" and "teh" are derived from the spoken word 'tre' (spelled "dred"), Tibetan for bear, with the 'r' so softly pronounced as to be almost inaudible, thus making it "te" or "teh".

Tibetan lore describes three main varieties of Yetis—the Nyalmo, which has black fur and is the largest and fiercest, standing around 15 feet (4.6 m); the Chuti, which stands around 8 feet (2.4 m) and lives between 8,000 and 10,000 ft (2,400 and 3,000 m) above sea level; and the Rang Shim Bombo, which has reddish-brown fur and is only between 3 and 5 ft (0.91 and 1.52 m) tall.

Other terms used by Himalayan peoples do not translate exactly the same, but refer to legendary and indigenous wildlife:

- Michê (Tibetan: མི་དྲེད་, Wylie: mi dred, ZWPY: Michê) translates as "man-bear".
- Dzu-teh – 'dzu' translates as "cattle" and the full meaning translates as "cattle bear", referring to the Himalayan brown bear.
- Migoi or Mi-go (Tibetan: མི་རྒོད་, Wylie: mi rgod, ZWPY: Migö/Mirgö) translates as "wild man".
- Bun Manchi – Nepali for "jungle man" that is used outside Sherpa communities where yeti is the common name.
- Mirka – Another name for "wild-man". Local legend holds that "anyone who sees one dies or is killed". The latter is taken from a written statement by Frank Smythe's sherpas in 1937.
- Kang Admi – "Snow Man".
- Jungli Admi – "Wild Man".
- Xueren (Chinese: 雪人) - "Snow Man"

=== Other names and locations ===
In Russian folklore, the Chuchuna is an entity said to dwell in Siberia. It has been described as six to seven feet tall and covered with dark hair. According to the native accounts from the nomadic Yakut and Tungus tribes, it is a well built, Neanderthal-like man wearing pelts and bearing a white patch of fur on its forearms. It is said to occasionally consume human flesh, unlike their close cousins, the Almastis. Some witnesses reported seeing a tail on the creature's corpse. There are additional tales of large, reclusive, bipedal creatures worldwide, notably including both "Bigfoot" and the "Abominable Snowman".

==== The Abominable Snowman ====
The name Abominable Snowman was coined in 1921, the year Lieutenant-Colonel Charles Howard-Bury led the 1921 British Mount Everest reconnaissance expedition, which he chronicled in Mount Everest The Reconnaissance, 1921. In the book, Howard-Bury includes an account of crossing the Lhagpa La at 21,000 ft (6,400 m) where he found footprints that he believed "were probably caused by a large 'loping' grey wolf, which in the soft snow formed double tracks rather like those of a bare-footed man". He adds that his Sherpa guides "at once volunteered that the tracks must be that of 'The Wild Man of the Snows', to which they gave the name 'metoh-kangmi'". "Metoh" translates as "man-bear" and "kang-mi" translates as "snowman".

Confusion exists between Howard-Bury's recitation of the term "metoh-kangmi" and the term used in Bill Tilman's book Mount Everest, 1938 where Tilman had used the words "metch", which does not exist in the Tibetan language, and "kangmi" when relating the coining of the term "Abominable Snowman". Further evidence of "metch" being a misnomer is provided by Tibetan language authority Professor David Snellgrove from the School of Oriental and African Studies at the University of London (ca. 1956), who dismissed the word "metch" as impossible, because the consonants "t-c-h" cannot be conjoined in the Tibetan language. Documentation suggests that the term "metch-kangmi" is derived from one source (from the year 1921). It has been suggested that "metch" is simply a misspelling of "metoh".

The use of "Abominable Snowman" began when Henry Newman, a longtime contributor to The Statesman in Calcutta, writing under the pen name "Kim", interviewed the porters of the "Everest Reconnaissance expedition" on their return to Darjeeling. Newman mistranslated the word "metoh" as "filthy", substituting the term "abominable", perhaps out of artistic licence. As author Bill Tilman recounts, "[Newman] wrote long after in a letter to The Times: The whole story seemed such a joyous creation I sent it to one or two newspapers".

== History and sightings ==
=== Pre-19th century ===
According to H. Siiger, the Yeti was a part of the pre-Buddhist beliefs of several Himalayan peoples. He was told that the Lepcha people worshipped a "Glacier Being" as a God of the Hunt. He also reported that followers of the Bön religion once believed the blood of the "mi rgod" or "wild man" had use in certain spiritual ceremonies. The being was depicted as an ape-like creature who carries a large stone as a weapon and makes a whistling swoosh sound.

Yeti was adopted into Tibetan Buddhism, where it is considered a nonhuman animal (tiragyoni) that is nonetheless human enough to sometimes be able to follow Dharma. Several stories feature Yetis becoming helpers and disciples to religious figures. In Tibet, images of Yetis are paraded and occasionally worshipped as guardians against evil spirits. However, because Yetis sometimes act as enforcers of Dharma, hearing or seeing one is often considered a bad omen, for which the witness must accumulate merit.

=== 19th century ===
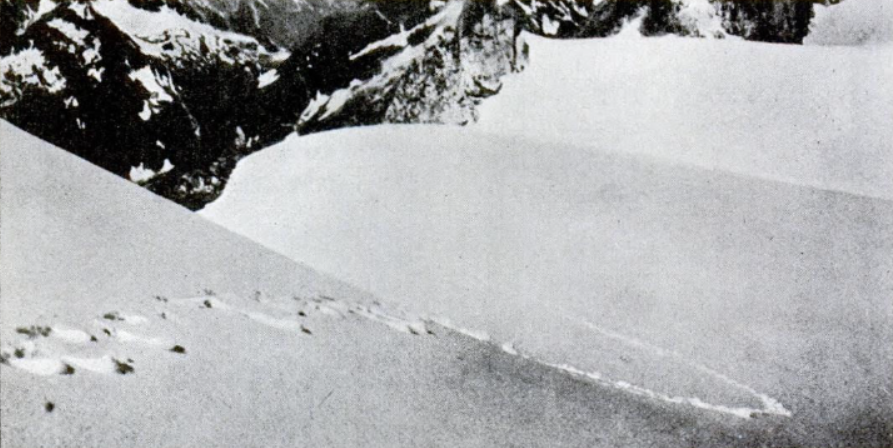
1937 Frank S. Smythe photograph of alleged Yeti footprints, printed in Popular Science, 1952

In 1832, James Prinsep's Journal of the Asiatic Society of Bengal published trekker B. H. Hodgson's account of his experiences in northern Nepal. His local guides spotted a tall bipedal creature covered with long dark hair, which seemed to flee in fear. Hodgson concluded it was an orangutan.

An early record of reported footprints appeared in 1899 in Laurence Waddell's Among the Himalayas. Waddell reported his guide's description of a large apelike creature that left the prints, which Waddell thought were made by a bear. Waddell heard stories of bipedal, apelike creatures but wrote that "none, however, of the many Tibetans I have interrogated on this subject could ever give me an authentic case. On the most superficial investigation, it always resolved into something that somebody heard tell of."

=== 20th century ===
The frequency of reports increased during the early 20th century when Westerners began making determined attempts to scale the many mountains in the area and occasionally reported seeing odd creatures or strange tracks.

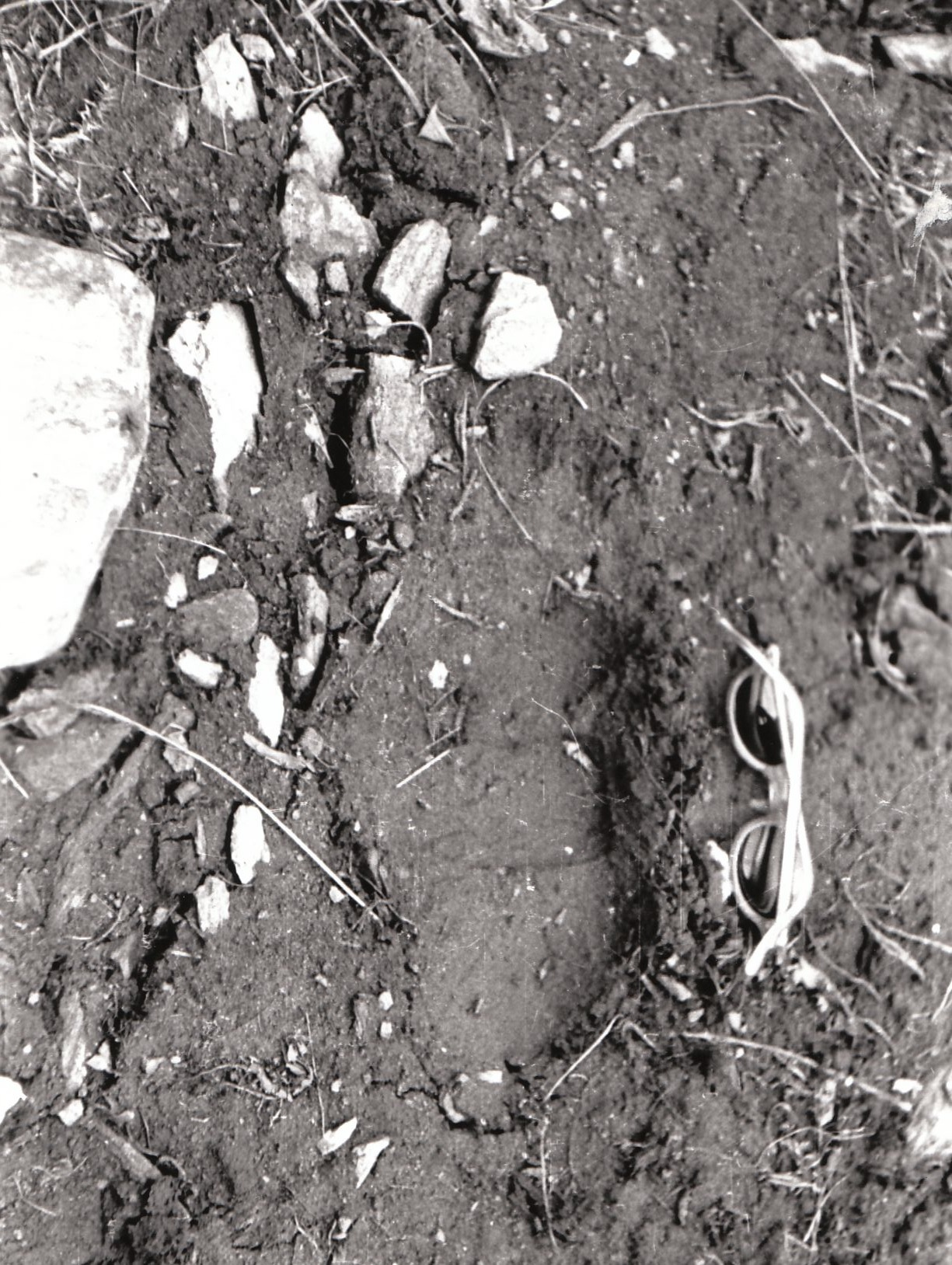
Purported Yeti footprint taken by C.R. Cooke in 1944

In 1925, N. A. Tombazi, a photographer and member of the Royal Geographical Society, writes that he saw a creature at about 15,000 ft (4,600 m) near Zemu Glacier. Tombazi later wrote that he observed the creature from about 200 to 300 yd (180 to 270 m), for about a minute. "Unquestionably, the figure in outline was exactly like a human being, walking upright and stopping occasionally to pull at some dwarf rhododendron bushes. It showed up dark against the snow, and as far as I could make out, wore no clothes." About two hours later, Tombazi and his companions descended the mountain and saw the creature's prints, described as "similar in shape to those of a man, but only 6 to 7 in (150 to 180 mm) long by 4 in (100 mm) wide... The prints were undoubtedly those of a biped."

During the autumn of 1937, John Hunt and Pasang Sherpa (later Pasang Dawa Lama) encountered footprints on the approaches to and at the Zemu Gap above the Zemu Glacier that were thought to belong to a pair of Yetis.

In June 1944, C.R. Cooke, his wife Maragaret, and a group of porters encountered very large bipedal prints in soft mud at 14,000 ft (4,300 m) just below the Singalila Ridge, which the porters said were of the "Jungli Admi" (wild man). The creature had come up through bushes on the steep hillside from Nepal and crossed the track before continuing up to the ridge. Cooke wrote "We laid Maragaret's sunglasses beside each print to indicate its size and took photographs. These prints were strange and larger than any normal human foot, 14 in (360 mm) heel to toe, with the great toe set back to one side, a first toe, also large, and three little toes closely bunched together."

Peter Byrne reported finding a yeti footprint in 1948, in northern Sikkim, near the Zemu Glacier, while on holiday from a Royal Air Force assignment in India.

Western interest in the Yeti peaked dramatically in the 1950s. While attempting to scale Mount Everest in 1951, Eric Shipton took photographs of a number of large prints in the snow, at about 6,000 m (20,000 ft) above sea level. Shipton took three photographs, one depicting the tracks, and other two of one particular print which was size compared by a pickaxe, and boot. The footprints had distinct two large toes, and three smaller digits close together. These photos have been subject to intense scrutiny and debate. Some argue they are the best evidence of Yeti's existence, while others contend the prints are those of a mundane creature that have been distorted by the melting snow. Jeffrey Meldrum examined a reconstructed form of the print in 2008, noting that one of the large toes was the result of Macrodactyly. He also stated the alignment of the toes matched that of a great ape, and the Yeti would likely spend more time in the subtropical region of the Himalayas. Meldrum stated it was hard to conclusively say the prints were genuine since Shipton only took two photos of a single track.

In 1953, Sir Edmund Hillary and Tenzing Norgay reported seeing large footprints while scaling Mount Everest. Hillary would later discount Yeti reports as unreliable. In his first autobiography Tenzing said that he believed the Yeti was a large ape, and although he had never seen it himself his father had seen one twice, but in his second autobiography he said he had become much more sceptical about its existence.

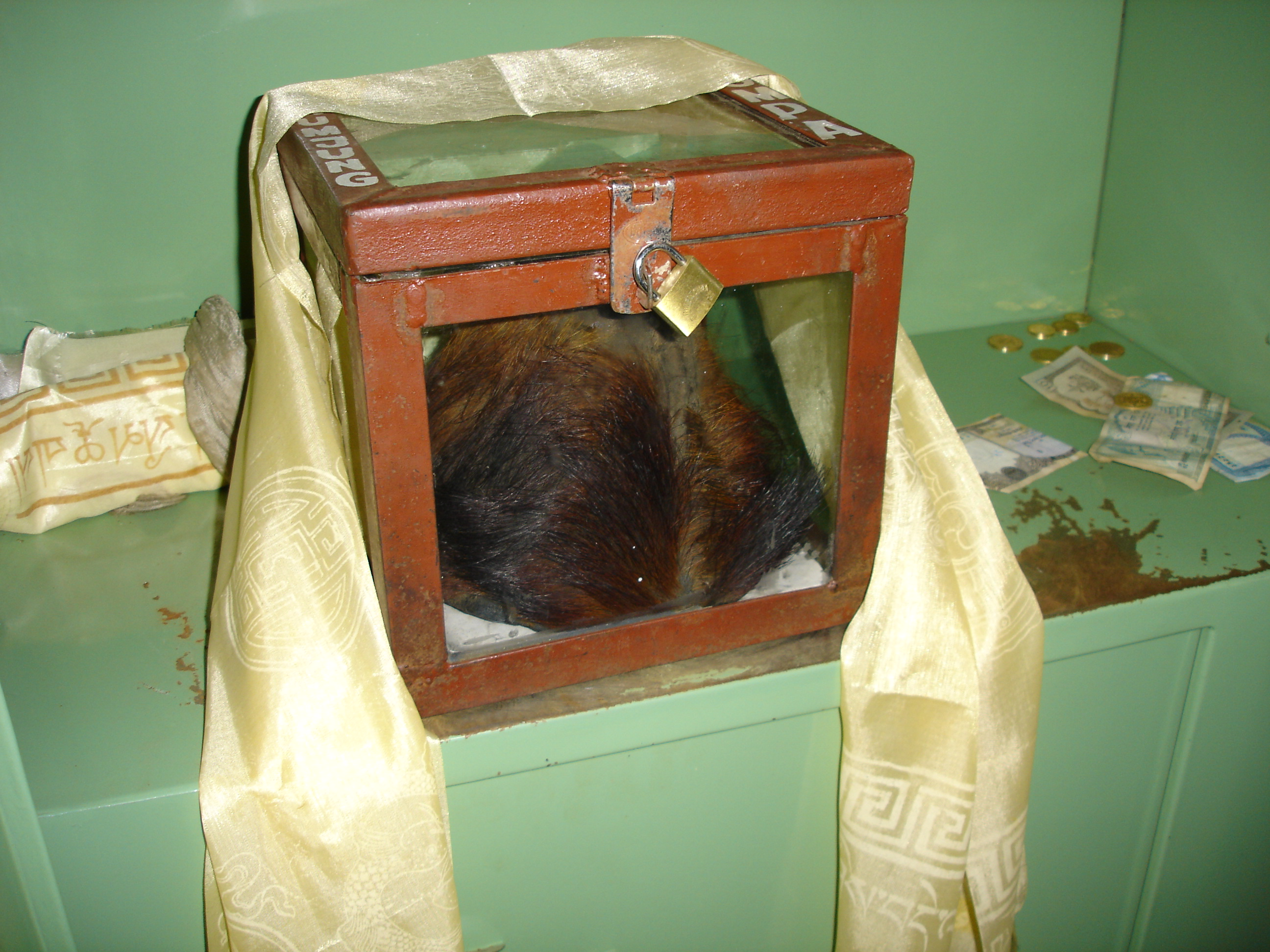
Purported Yeti scalp at Khumjung monastery

During the Daily Mail Snowman Expedition of 1954, the mountaineering leader John Angelo Jackson made the first trek from Everest to Kanchenjunga in the course of which he photographed symbolic paintings of the Yeti at Tengboche gompa. Jackson tracked and photographed many footprints in the snow, most of which were identifiable. However, there were many large footprints that could not be identified. These flattened footprint-like indentations were attributed to erosion and subsequent widening of the original footprint by wind and particles.

Dr. Biswamoy Biswas examining the Pangboche Yeti scalp during the Daily Mail Snowman Expedition of 1954

On 19 March 1954, the Daily Mail printed an article which described expedition teams obtaining hair specimens from what was alleged to be a Yeti scalp found in the Pangboche monastery. The hairs were black to dark brown in colour in dim light, and fox red in sunlight. The hair was analysed by Professor Frederic Wood Jones, an expert in human and comparative anatomy. During the study, the hairs were bleached, cut into sections and analysed microscopically. The research consisted of taking microphotographs of the hairs and comparing them with hairs from known animals such as bears and orangutans. Jones concluded that the hairs were not actually from a scalp. He contended that while some animals do have a ridge of hair extending from the pate to the back, no animals have a ridge (as in the Pangboche scalp) running from the base of the forehead across the pate and ending at the nape of the neck. Jones was unable to pinpoint exactly the animal from which the Pangboche hairs were taken. He was, however, convinced that the hairs were not from a bear or anthropoid ape, but instead from the shoulder of a coarse-haired hoofed animal.

Sławomir Rawicz claimed in his book The Long Walk, published in 1956, that as he and some others were crossing the Himalayas in the winter of 1942, their path was blocked for hours by two bipedal animals that were doing seemingly nothing but shuffling around in the snow.

Beginning in 1957, the Texas oil businessman and adventurer Tom Slick led an expedition to the Nepal Himalayas to investigate Yeti reports, with the anthropologist prof. Carleton S. Coon as one of its members. In 1959, supposed Yeti feces were collected by one of Slick's expeditions; fecal analysis found a parasite which could not be classified. The United States government thought that finding the Yeti was likely enough to create three rules for American expeditions searching for it: obtain a Nepalese permit, do not harm the Yeti except in self-defense, and let the Nepalese government approve any news reporting on the animal's discovery. In 1959, actor James Stewart, while visiting India, reportedly smuggled the so-called Pangboche Hand, by concealing it in his luggage when he flew from India to London.

In 1960, Sir Edmund Hillary mounted the 1960–61 Silver Hut expedition to the Himalayas, which was to collect and analyse physical evidence of the Yeti. Hillary borrowed a supposed Yeti scalp from the Khumjung monastery then himself and Khumjo Chumbi (the village headman), brought the scalp back to London where a small sample was cut off for testing. Marca Burns made a detailed examination of the sample of skin and hair from the margin of the alleged Yeti scalp and compared it with similar samples from the serow, blue bear and black bear. Burns concluded the sample "was probably made from the skin of an animal closely resembling the sampled specimen of Serow, but definitely not identical with it: possibly a local variety or race of the same species, or a different but closely related species."

Up to the 1960s, belief in the yeti was relatively common in Bhutan and in 1966 a Bhutanese stamp was made to honour the creature. However, in the 21st century, belief in the being has declined.

In 1970, British mountaineer Don Whillans claimed to have witnessed a creature when scaling Annapurna. He reported that he once saw it moving on all fours.

In 1983, Himalayan conservationist Daniel C. Taylor and Himalayan natural historian Robert L. Fleming Jr. led a yeti expedition into Nepal's Barun Valley (suggested by discovery in the Barun in 1972 of footprints alleged to be yeti by Cronin & McNeely). The Taylor-Fleming expedition also discovered similar yeti-like footprints (hominoid appearing with both a hallux and bipedal gait), intriguing large nests in trees, and vivid reports from local villagers of two bears, rukh bhalu ('tree bear', small, reclusive, weighing about 150 pounds (68 kg)) and bhui bhalu ('ground bear', aggressive, weighing up to 400 pounds (180 kg)). Further interviews across Nepal gave evidence of local belief in two different bears. Skulls were collected, these were compared to known skulls at the Smithsonian Institution, American Museum of Natural History, and British Museum, and confirmed identification of a single species, the Asiatic black bear, showing no morphological difference between 'tree bear' and 'ground bear.' (This despite an intriguing skull in the British Museum of a 'tree bear' collected in 1869 by Oldham and discussed in the Annals of the Royal Zoological Society.)

=== 21st century ===
In 2004, Henry Gee, editor of the journal Nature, mentioned the Yeti as an example of folk belief deserving further study, writing, "The discovery that Homo floresiensis survived until so very recently, in geological terms, makes it more likely that stories of other mythical, human-like creatures such as Yetis are founded on grains of truth."

In early December 2007, American television presenter Joshua Gates and his team (Destination Truth) reported finding a series of footprints in the Everest region of Nepal resembling descriptions of Yeti. Each of the footprints measured 33 cm (13 in) in length with five toes that measured a total of 25 cm (9.8 in) across. Casts were made of the prints for further research. The footprints were examined by Jeffrey Meldrum of Idaho State University, who initially believed them to be too morphologically accurate to be fake or man-made, before changing his mind after making further investigations. In 2009, on an episode of Destination Truth, Gates presented hair samples to a forensic analyst who concluded that the hair contained an unknown DNA sequence. A cast of the footprint is kept in the "Yeti Museum" section of the queue for Disney's Expedition Everest ride.

On 25 July 2008, the BBC reported that hairs collected in the remote Garo Hills area of North-East India by Dipu Marak had been analysed at Oxford Brookes University in the UK by primatologist Anna Nekaris and microscopy expert Jon Wells. These initial tests were inconclusive, and ape conservation expert Ian Redmond told the BBC that there was similarity between the cuticle pattern of these hairs and specimens collected by Edmund Hillary during Himalayan expeditions in the 1950s, which Hillary had donated to the Oxford University Museum of Natural History. Redmond announced planned DNA analysis of the hairs. This analysis has since revealed that the hair came from the Himalayan goral.

In 2010, a group of Chinese scientists and explorers proposed to renew searches in the Shennongjia Forestry District of Hubei province, which was the site of expeditions in the 1970s and 1980s.

At a 2011 conference in Russia, participating scientists and enthusiasts declared having "95% evidence" of the Yeti's existence. However, this claim was disputed later; American anthropologist and anatomist Jeffrey Meldrum, who was present during the Russian expedition, claimed the "evidence" found was simply an attempt by local officials to drum up publicity.

In December 2011, a yeti was reportedly captured in Russia. Initially the story claimed that a hunter reported having seen a bear-like creature trying to kill one of his sheep but, after he fired his gun, the creature ran into a forest on two legs. The story then claimed that border patrol soldiers captured a hairy two-legged female creature similar to a gorilla that ate meat and vegetation. This was later revealed as a hoax or possibly a publicity stunt for charity.

In April 2019, an Indian army mountaineering expedition team claimed to have spotted mysterious "Yeti" footprints, measuring 81 by 38 cm (32 by 15 in), near the Makalu base camp.

== Proposed explanations ==
The misidentification of Himalayan wildlife has been proposed as an explanation for some Yeti sightings, including the chu-teh, a langur monkey living at lower altitudes; the Tibetan blue bear; or the Himalayan brown bear or dzu-teh, also known as the Himalayan red bear.

Similarly, it is possible that sightings have been deliberate hoaxes. Sceptic James Randi notes that convincing costumes of gorillas or other apes have been used in films, which are more convincing than any representations of the Yeti provided by believers. Randi also argues that there would need to be many creatures in order to maintain the gene pool, and given the proposed size of the Yeti, it is hard to imagine that they have been so elusive if they are real.

A well publicised expedition to Bhutan initially reported that a hair sample had been obtained, which according to DNA analysis by Professor Bryan Sykes could not be matched to any known animal. Analysis completed after the media release, however, clearly showed the samples were from a brown bear (Ursus arctos) and an Asiatic black bear (Ursus thibetanus).

In 1986, South Tyrolean mountaineer Reinhold Messner claimed in his autobiography My Quest for the Yeti that the Yeti is actually the endangered Himalayan brown bear, Ursus arctos isabellinus, or Tibetan blue bear, U. a. pruinosus, which can walk both upright or on all fours.

=== Asiatic black bear theory ===
The 1983 Barun Valley discoveries prompted three years of research on the 'tree bear' possibility by Taylor, Fleming, John Craighead and Tirtha Shrestha. From that research, the conclusion was that the Asiatic black bear, when about two years old, spends much time in trees to avoid attack by larger male bears on the ground ('ground bears'). During this tree period (that may last two years), young bears train their inner claw outward, allowing an opposable grip. The imprint in the snow of a hind paw coming over the front paw that appears to have a hallux, especially when the bear is going slightly uphill so the hind pawprint extends the overprint backward, makes a hominid-appearing track, both in that it is elongated like a human foot, but with a "thumb", and in that a four-footed animal's gait now appears bipedal. This "yeti discovery", in the words of National Geographic Magazine editor Bill Garrett, "[by] on-site research sweeps away much of the 'smoke and mirrors' and gives us a believable yeti".

This fieldwork in Nepal's Barun Valley led directly to the initiation of the Makalu-Barun National Park that protected over half a million acres in 1991, and across the border with China, the Qomolangma national nature preserve in the Tibet Autonomous Region that protected over six million acres. In the words of Honorary President of the American Alpine Club, Robert H. Bates, this yeti discovery "has apparently solved the mystery of the yeti, or at least part of it, and in so doing added to the world's great wildlife preserves", so that the shy animal, and the mysteries and myths of the Himalayas that it represents, can continue to live within a protected area nearly the size of Switzerland.

=== DNA analysis ===
In 2013, a call was put out by scientists from the universities of Oxford and Lausanne for people claiming to have samples from these sorts of creatures. A mitochondrial DNA analysis of the 12S RNA gene was undertaken on samples of hair from an unidentified animal from Ladakh in northern India on the west of the Himalayas, and one from Bhutan. These samples were compared with those in GenBank, the international repository of gene sequences, and matched a sample from an ancient polar bear jawbone found in Svalbard, Norway that dates back to between 40,000 and 120,000 years ago. The result suggests that, barring hoaxes of planted samples or contamination, bears in these regions may have been taken to be yeti. Professor of evolutionary genetics at the University of Cambridge, Bill Amos, doubted the samples were of polar bears in the Himalayas, but was "90% convinced that there is a bear in these regions that has been mistaken for a yeti". Professor Bryan Sykes, whose team carried out the analysis of the samples at Oxford, has his own theory. He believes that the samples may have come from a hybrid species of bear produced from a mating between a brown bear and a polar bear. A research of 12S rRNA published in 2015 revealed that the hair samples collected are most likely those of brown bears. In 2017, a new analysis compared mtDNA sequences of bears from the region with DNA extracted from hair and other samples claimed to have come from yeti. It included hair thought to be from the same preserved specimen as the anomalous Sykes sample, and showed it to have been a Himalayan brown bear, while other purported yeti samples were actually from the Tibetan blue bear, Asiatic black bear and a domestic dog.

=== Linguistics ===
In 2003, Japanese researcher and mountaineer Dr. Makoto Nebuka published the results of his twelve-year linguistic study, postulating that the word "Yeti" is a corruption of the word "meti", a regional dialect term for a "bear". Nebuka claims that ethnic Tibetans fear and worship the bear as a supernatural being. Nebuka's claims were subject to almost immediate criticism, and he was accused of linguistic carelessness. Dr. Raj Kumar Pandey, who has researched both Yetis and mountain languages, said "it is not enough to blame tales of the mysterious beast of the Himalayas on words that rhyme but mean different things."

In 2017, Daniel C. Taylor published a comprehensive analysis of the century-long Yeti literature, giving added evidence to the Asian black bear (Ursus thibetanus) explanation, building on the initial Barun Valley discoveries. His book gave a meticulous explanation for the iconic Yeti footprint photographed by Eric Shipton in 1950, the 1972 Cronin-McNeely print, as well all other unexplained Yeti footprints. To complete this explanation, Taylor also located a never-before published photograph in the archives of the Royal Geographical Society, taken in 1950 by Eric Shipton, that included scratches that are clearly bear nail marks. Alleged Yeti footprints have been generally interpreted as bear-made.

=== Ape theory ===
Some speculate these reported creatures could be present-day specimens of the extinct giant ape Gigantopithecus. However, the Yeti is generally described as bipedal, and most scientists believe Gigantopithecus to have been quadrupedal, and so massive that, unless it evolved specifically as a bipedal ape (like the hominids), walking upright would have been even more difficult for the now extinct primate than it is for its extant quadrupedal relative, the orangutan.

== See also ==
General

- Yeti in popular culture
- List of legendary creatures
- Tsul 'Kalu
- Denisova hominin
- Wild Man of the Navidad
- List of topics characterised as pseudoscience
- Bigfoot: The Life and Times of a Legend

Similar alleged creatures

- Almas – Central Asia
- Am Fear Liath Mòr – United Kingdom
- Amomongo – Philippines
- Barmanou – Afghanistan and Pakistan
- Bigfoot – North America
- Daeva or Div – Tajikistan, Iran
- Chuchunya – Siberia
- Fouke Monster – United States
- Hibagon – Japan
- Mande Barung – India
- Mapinguari – South America
- Menk – Russia
- Momo the Monster – United States
- Nittaewo - Sri Lanka
- Ochokochi – Georgia
- Orang Mawas – Malaysia
- Orang Pendek – Indonesia
- Skunk ape – United States
- Urayuli – United States, Canada
- Yeren – China
- Yowie – Australia

== General and cited references ==
- Izzard, Ralph (1955) The Abominable Snowman Adventure. Hodder and Stoughton.
- Taylor, Daniel (1995). Something Hidden Behind the Ranges: An Himalayan Quest. San Francisco: Mercury House. ISBN 1562790730.
- Tilman, H. W. (1938). Appendix B. Mount Everest 1938. Pilgrim Publishing. ISBN 81-7769-175-9. pp. 127–37.
