= Mande Barung =

Alleged ape-like creature said to inhabit the Meghalaya subtropical forests in India

The Mande Burung is an alleged ape-like creature said to inhabit the Meghalaya subtropical forests in the remote Garo Hills of Northeast India.

Reports depict the Mande Burung as a massive hominin covered in hair, purportedly measuring 3 metres (9.8 ft) tall and weighing an estimated 300 kilograms (660 lb). It is generally described as herbivorous, and has been speculated by proponents to descend from Gigantopithecus. Monster-hunting tours have been organized by supporters of non-prosaic hypotheses, although forest officers have expressed skepticism, asserting that no such megafaunal primates are present in the area. Some believe that this alleged animal, or its relatives, may be found around the world under different regional names, such as the Yeti of Tibet and Nepal, the Hantu Jarang Gigi of Indonesia, the Yowie of Australia, the Mapinguari of Brazil, or the Bigfoot of the Pacific Northwest of the United States and Canada.

Hair samples attested to have originated from the Mande Barung were analyzed in 2008, and although preliminary results reportedly ruled out some known local fauna, DNA testing was suggested as a means to further investigate the alleged evidence. Upon DNA testing, it was found that the hair traces belonged to the Himalayan goral, a goatlike animal that was not native to the region.

== See also ==
- Bigfoot
- Mapinguari
- Orang Mawas
- Yeren
- Yeti
- Yowie
