= Monkey-man of Delhi =

Indian urban legend

- Police artist's impression of the Monkey Man of New Delhi

Creature information
- Other names: Face Scratcher; Black Monkey
- Grouping: Primate (hybrid)
- Sub grouping: Hominid
- Similar entities: Bukit Timah Monkey Man; Orang Pendek; Spring-heeled Jack
- Folklore: Indian urban legend, Mass hysteria

Origin
- First attested: 5 April 2001
- Known for: Attacking people at night; Leaping between buildings; Reportedly causing around 60 instances of injuries and 2–3 deaths
- Country: India
- Region: New Delhi, NCT of Delhi
- Habitat: Urban
- Details: Physical description (varied) - 4-8 feet (1.2 – 2.4 m) tall, covered in thick black hair, glowing red eyes, vulpine snout, metal claws, muscular body; Attributes - metal helmet, three buttons on chest, roller-skates

The Monkey-man of Delhi, also known as the Face Scratcher or the Black Monkey, is an unknown anomaly which was reported to be roaming Delhi in mid-2001. The entire incident has been described as an example of mass hysteria in India.

== History ==
In May 2001, reports circulated in New Delhi, India concerning a monkey-like creature that attacked people at night. Eyewitness accounts were often inconsistent, but usually described the creature as about four feet (120 cm) tall, covered in thick black hair, with a metal helmet, metal claws, glowing red eyes and three buttons on its chest. Some reports also claim that it wore roller-skates. Others, however, described the Monkey-man as having a more vulpine snout, and being up to eight feet tall, and muscular; it would leap from building to building.

In mid-2002, a group of four teenagers from the affluent Nizamuddin East colony tried replicating the act by dressing up in monkey costumes and stole money from local vegetable vendors. All four were apprehended by the police and released with a warning. The perpetrators were later named by the media as Arth Agarwal, Vishal Agarwal, Karan Grover and an unnamed underage accomplice.

Over 350 sightings of the Monkey-man were reported, including around 60 which resulted in injuries. Police released artist's sketches of eyewitness accounts in an attempt to catch the creature. Two (by some reports, three) people reportedly died when they fell from the tops of buildings or down stairwells in a panic caused when they thought they were under attack.

== In popular culture ==
=== Film ===
In the Tamil film Dhill (2001), a comic character named Ezhumalai (Mayilsamy) boards an all-women’s bus and flirts with a passenger, who turns out to be a plainclothes cop. As Ezhumalai is tackled by the cop, one of his associates, 'Megaserial' Mahadevan (Vivek), jokingly comments from outside: "He is that Delhi Monkey Man! Take him to the [police] station!".

The appearance of Monkey-man in Old Delhi is the centre-point of the Hindi film Delhi-6 (2009) directed by Rakeysh Omprakash Mehra. In the film, the creature is used as an allegory to represent the evil that resides inside every man alongside God (virtue).

=== Television ===
In 2012, the Hindi TV series Mrs. Kaushik Ki Paanch Bahuein featured a story track around the mystery of "Kala Bandar" (Black Monkey).

=== Music ===
The Monkey-man is referenced in "Mysterious Man-Monkey", the 12th track in American cello rock band Rasputina's 2011 album Great American Gingerbread: Rasputina Rarities & Neglected Items.

=== Print media ===
In the 2011 graphic novel Munkeeman by Tere Bin Laden director Abhishek Sharma, the creature is interpreted as a misunderstood superhero, who was the result of a science experiment gone wrong. The first edition, Munkeeman Vol 1 chronicled the creatures brief appearance in Delhi, and the second edition will feature the creature in Kanpur, based on the incidents reported in February 2002.

== See also ==
- Vanara
- Superstition
- Spring-Heeled Jack
- Bukit Timah Monkey Man
- Urban legend
- Hanuman
