= Kaye Reed =

American biological anthropologist

Kaye Reed (born April 1951) is a biological anthropologist focused on discovering evidence of early hominins and interpreting their paleoenvironment. She is presently concentrating her research on the lower Awash Valley in Ethiopia, as well as the South African Pleistocene, in order to study behavioral ecology. Kaye Reed is currently working at Arizona State University (ASU) in Tempe, AZ, where she is the Director of the School of Human Evolution and Social Change (SHESC). She has been a full professor since 2012 within SHESC (with the designation of President's Professor since 2014), as well as a Research Associate within the Institute of Human Origins (IHO). Reed's other research interests include the paleoecology of early hominins, mammalian paleontology and biogeography, community ecology, human evolution, and macroecology.

== Life and education ==
Kaye Reed was born in Pittsburgh, Pennsylvania, in April 1951 to her parents Edward Reed and Anne Swearingen. She has three brothers and one sister. Reed is now married and has one son and grandchildren.

Kaye Reed received her B.S. in anthropology from Portland State University in 1989. She earned her M.A. in 1993, and her Ph.D. in 1996, both in Anthropology, from Stony Brook University (SUNY). Her dissertation topic was “Geographic and climate control of primate diversity” and her thesis advisor was John Fleagle.

== Early positions held ==
Before joining the faculty at ASU, Reed served as an Honorary Research Associate at the Bernard Price Institute for Palaeontological Research at the University of the Witwatersrand in Johannesburg, South Africa (1993–2004). In 1995, she worked as a coordinator and instructor at the University of the Witwatersrand Field School. She continued her work at the University of the Witwatersrand from 1997- 2004 as Director of the Makapansgat Palaeoanthropology Field School through the Institute of Human Origins. From 2000 to 2004, Reed was an Honorary Research Associate in the Department of Anatomy and Human Biology at the University of the Witwatersrand Medical School.

Reed's work as a postdoctoral research associate with the Institute of Human Origins (1995–1997) brought her to ASU when IHO moved there in 1997. Reed next became an assistant professor in the Department of Anthropology at ASU (1997). The Department of Anthropology became the School of Human Evolution and Social Change in 2005. From 2002 to 2012, Reed held the role of associate professor at the newly formed SHESC. Reed was associate director of SHESC from 2006 to 2008, and again from 2014 to 2016. In 2016 she was appointed to her current position as Director of SHESC.

From 2009 until 2011, she worked for the National Science Foundation, in Arlington, Virginia, as the Biological Anthropology Program Director.

== Awards ==
In 2000, Kaye Reed received the Centennial Professorship Award for outstanding mentoring and teaching, from the Associated Students of ASU. Reed won the Outstanding Faculty Member Award from the Faculty Women's Association at ASU in 2013. In 2014, Reed was named a President's Professor at ASU. In 2023 Reed was awarded Fellow of the American Association for the Advancement of Science.

== Research ==
Reed is especially interested in mammalian and primate diversity and biogeography. Reed uses large comparative data sets to interpret the community structure of fossils mammals from various Plio-Pleistocene sites. Since 2002 she has directed the Ledi-Geraru Research Project, located in the Afar Region of the Lower Awash Valley in Ethiopia. Reed and her team are looking for fossils to help them understand the disappearance of Australopithecus afarensis and the later appearance of Homo in the region. They have discovered sediments dating from 2.95 to 2.4 Ma, which is a rarity in the Lower Awash Valley.

Many of Reed's other projects were focused in South Africa. She studied in the Makapansgat Valley in 1994 and then from 1998 until 2003. She worked to reconstruct the habitat and ecology of Au. africanus. Reed concluded that Au. africanus was not able to tolerate more arid and open habitats and suggested that a longer dry season eventually caused the extinction of the species.

Outside of South Africa, Reed traveled to the Bouri Peninsula in Eritrea in 1997, and she worked at the Contrebandiers Cave in Morocco from 2006 until 2008.

In addition to her research in Africa, Reed has conducted field work in the Crazy Mountain Basin in Montana in 1990, in Cabeza Blanca, Chubut, Argentina in 1993, and in the Sopeña Cave in Asturias, Spain from 2004 to 2006.
