= Ebu gogo =

Creatures in Indonesian folklore

The Ebu Gogo are a group of human-like creatures that appear in the folklore of Flores, Indonesia. In the Nage language of central Flores, ebu means "grandparent" and gogo means "one who eats anything". A colloquial English equivalent might be something like "old glutton".

== Folklore record ==
The Nage people of Flores describe the Ebu Gogo as having been able walkers and fast runners around 1.5 m (5 feet) tall. They reportedly had wide and flat noses, and broad faces with large mouths and hairy bodies. The females also had "long, pendulous breasts". They were said to have murmured in what was assumed to be their own language and could reportedly repeat what was said to them in a parrot-like fashion.

The legends relating to the Ebu Gogo were traditionally attributed to monkeys, according to the journal Nature.

An article in New Scientist gives the following account of folklore on Flores surrounding the Ebu Gogo: in the 18th century, villagers gave the Ebu Gogo a gift of palm fiber to make clothes, and once the Ebu Gogo took the fiber into their cave, the villagers threw in a firebrand to set it alight, killing all of the occupants (one pair may have fled into the forest).

There are also legends about the Ebu Gogo kidnapping human children, hoping to learn how to cook them. The children always easily outwit the Ebu Gogo in the tales.

== Proposed connection to Homo floresiensis ==
The ebu gogo folklore has gained public attention with the discovery of Homo floresiensis, an extinct hominid species that inhabited Flores until c. 50,000 years ago or later. The ethnologist Gregory Forth (2008) has suggested that tales about ebu gogo and similar figures in the folklore of Indonesia such as the Orang Pendek are based on the memory of actual encounters between modern humans and Homo floresiensis. Linguist John McWhorter also supports this hypothesis regarding the ebu gogo. The hypothesis of contacts between the ebu gogo and the ancestors of the present population is also sustained by the unique designs of Ngadha ikat: their motifs are executed as stick figures, which give them a strikingly 'primitive' appearance resembling some prehistoric cave drawings.

This proposal has little mainstream support, especially after the dating of youngest known skeleton of Homo floresiensis, which initially was assumed to have lived c. 12,000 BP, was revised to 50,000 BP.

== See also ==
- Menehune
- Nittaewo
- Orang Pendek
- Orang Mawas
- Bukit Timah Monkey Man
