= Capturing Bigfoot =

2026 documentary about the 1967 Patterson–Gimlin film directed by Marq Evans

- Directed by: Marq Evans
- Produced by: Tamir Ardon; Marq Evans; Nick Spicer
- Starring: Teresa Brooks; Sandy Collier; Bob Gimlin
- Cinematography: Jason Roark
- Music by: Jonathan Sadoff
- Release dates: March 12, 2026 (SXSW); October 20, 2026 (United States)
- Running time: 103 minutes
- Country: United States
- Language: English

Capturing Bigfoot is a 2026 American documentary film directed by Marq Evans. The film reports new information about the often-cited 1967 film clip purported to show a walking Bigfoot, known as the Patterson–Gimlin film, and the men who filmed it, Roger Patterson and Robert "Bob" Gimlin. Capturing Bigfoot is based on new and revealing film footage given to Evans in 2022 which had been locked away in a safe for decades, as well as interviews with Patterson's son Clint Patterson and people associated with the 1967 film.

== Synopsis ==
The documentary centers on the personalities of Roger Patterson and Bob Gimlin who claimed in 1967 to have 59 seconds of footage showing a Bigfoot walking through a wooded area of northern California. Through interviews, Evans "creates rounded profiles of the good ol' boys at the heart of the story, none of whom seem completely trustworthy." Telling a fuller picture of who Roger Patterson was, Evans leans on Clint Patterson whose relationship with his father was considered "hero worship" but the son also called him a "liar". The end of Capturing Bigfoot claims to show the recently found footage of Patterson and Gimlin rehearsing. The footage that once made many question the existence of the cryptid, is revealed to be a hoax.

== Cast ==
- Teresa Brooks – instructor at Olympic College who found film owned by her father Norm Johnson, who was connected to Patterson and Gimlin
- Sandy Collier
- Bob Gimlin – co-creator of the 1967 Patterson–Gimlin film
- Bob Heironimus – has long claimed to have been person wearing the Bigfoot suit in the film but has given inconsistent testimony
- Greg Long – Patterson–Gimlin film skeptic
- Larry Lund
- Jeffrey Meldrum – American anthropologist and academic
- Bill Munns – Hollywood makeup and visual effects specialist
- Clint Patterson – son of Roger Patterson
- Vaile Thompson
- Patty Patterson – widow of Roger Patterson

== Production ==
After the death of her father, Norm Johnson, Olympic College film instructor Teresa Brooks reached out to filmmaker and colleague Marq Evans in June 2022 with a reel of 16 mm film she had found in a locked safe of her father's. Johnson had worked in a Boeing film lab during the years that the Patterson–Gimlin film was made and was connected to Patterson and Gimlin through Johnson's brother Dave. Evans digitized the film and discovered a 40-second clip that had been "produced and developed" in 1966, a year before the Patterson–Gimlin film was shot, which shows a dress rehearsal of a skinnier Bigfoot walking through a wooded area similar to the later film. Evans realized what he was looking at and approached Clint Patterson, son of Roger Patterson, and asked if he had any insight into the rehearsal footage. Evans was surprised to discover that Clint was willing to talk but found that he had been contemplating a tell-all book when he was approached. Roger had died of Hodgkin lymphoma when Clint was twelve. Clint says that about ten years prior to his talks with Evans, he had learned from his mother that the Bigfoot sighting was a hoax, which weighed on Clint. He says that he intended to reveal this to the public, but his mother, upset about the loss of income, disowned him.

Capturing Bigfoot paid the $30,000 licensing fee for use of the 1967 Patterson–Gimlin film.

Evans conducts interviews with Yakima, Washington residents who had known the filmmakers in that era, "including 80-something-year-old Bob Heironimus, who confessed to being the individual wearing the fake Bigfoot suit in the film." He also interviews anthropologist Jeffrey Meldrum, who "detects real mammalian musculature" in the film's subject, and Bill Munns, a Hollywood makeup and visual effects specialist.

Matt Moneymaker of the Bigfoot Field Researchers Organization (BFRO), who, when informed that new footage is to be released showing the Patterson–Gimlin film as a hoax, says, "My initial reaction is, how could you believe that in the age of AI? Even if they found some reel, how would you know whether what they're showing in the documentary is what's on the reel?" He also says, "This sort of chicanery has been going on since at least the '90s. ... The film itself debunks any attempts to debunk it.'" Evans states that the documentary does not use AI-generated material, saying, "We're 100 per cent confident in what we have."

Evans and producer Tamir Ardon state in an interview that the documentary does not seek to answer the question "Is Bigfoot Real?", but merely focuses on the issue of the film, and subjects involved. According to Evans, "Patricia Patterson and Bob Heironimus, there has been a lot of pain, they were childhood friends, and they haven't spoke for over thirty years because of what's gone on with this. This film has brought them back together and Clint and his mom and so that's the good stuff. There is some sadness for some people who believe in this film, but there is also a lot of joy for the people who were closely involved who have had families ripped apart by it." Ardon feels that this newly found footage is an important part of "Americana".

== Release ==
The documentary premiered March 12, 2026, at the South by Southwest (SXSW) music and film festival in Austin, Texas.

It was released by XYZ Films in select U.S. cities and made available for digital purchase or rental on Amazon Prime Video on October 20, 2026.

== Reception ==
People journalist Johnny Dodd calls Capturing Bigfoot a "groundbreaking documentary", and noted the "complicated and tragic" way that Evans frames the story behind the film.

Richard Whittaker, The Austin Chronicle Culture Desk editor, who notes that Evans did not merely intend to make an exposé addressing whether Bigfoot exists, but to tell the story of the men around the Patterson–Gimlin film through the "small-town feud between a bunch of guys in their 80s, most of whom feel ill-served by or cut out of its history and profits." wrote the Evans effected a sense of balance by creating rounded, compassionate portraits of the subjects in the film, including the late and "enigmatic" Roger Patterson, and his "semi-tragic" son Clint, focusing on the subjects' reactions to the newly uncovered footage, instead of merely focusing on the footage itself.

John Jurgensen, writing for The Wall Street Journal, observes, "At a time when internet rumors, misinformation bots and AI-powered deception have made viral conspiracies a daily scourge, the shaky film clip seems like a prequel to the confusion that has engulfed our era and eroded confidence in the very idea of truth."

Benjamin Radford, writing about the documentary in Skeptical Inquirer, while acknowledging that the film's status as further evidence that the Patterson–Gimlin film was a hoax would probably be greeted by skeptics with a "shrug", said that the newly uncovered information in the film provides important lessons about the nature of confirmation bias, and in particular, how so many noted advocates of the existence of Bigfoot including Jeff Meldrum, could have been as assured as they were in the supposed authenticity of the 1967 film.
