= Bukit Timah Monkey Man =

Singaporean cryptid

Creature information
- Other name(s): BTM, BTMM
- Sub grouping: Hominid/primate (hybrid)
- Similar entities: Orang Pendek, Monkey-man of Delhi

Origin
- First attested: 1805
- Country: Singapore
- Region: Bukit Timah
- Habitat: Forest

The Bukit Timah Monkey Man, commonly abbreviated as BTM or BTMM, is a cryptid said to inhabit Singapore, chiefly in the forested Bukit Timah region. The creature is often cited as a forest-dwelling hominid or primate, and is also accounted for as being immortal; however, its exact identity remains unknown, and its existence disputed. Documentation of the BTM is sparse and scattered; the creature is largely considered a product of local folklore.

Alleged sightings of the animal are rare. Records mainly come from Malay folklore, accounts from Japanese soldiers in World War II, and occasional unconfirmed reports from local residents. The first claimed sighting is said to have occurred in about 1805; the most recent was in 2020.

The BTM is said to be hominid-like, greyish in colour, and about 1.75 m (5 ft 9 in) in height, with a bipedal gait. All sightings have been centred upon the Bukit Timah region.

== Sightings ==
Sightings of the BTM are rare, almost entirely contained within the Bukit Timah region and its vicinity. The first report of the creature came in 1805, when a Malay elder claimed to have seen an upright-walking, monkey-faced creature in the Bukit Timah area. Japanese soldiers also reported sightings of the creature during World War II.

In 2007, a series of sightings were reported in the Singapore tabloid, The New Paper, has since featured the cryptid on its papers, gathering accounts from a number of witnesses.

The Chinese-language paper Shin Min Daily News also reported on the BTM in 2008, stating that the Monkey Man would appear after dark in the Bukit Timah Nature Reserve. The paper described the creature as having the face of a monkey but walking upright like a man; it dispatched a journalist to comb for evidence, but the expedition proved futile. The Bukit Timah Nature Reserve official take provided at that point in time was that people were mistaking the common long-tailed (aka crab-eating) macaque monkeys for the Monkey Man.

In late 2020, the Bukit Timah monkey man was allegedly spotted by a night hiker, an event which was extensively covered in local media reports.

== Similarities ==
=== With local monkeys ===
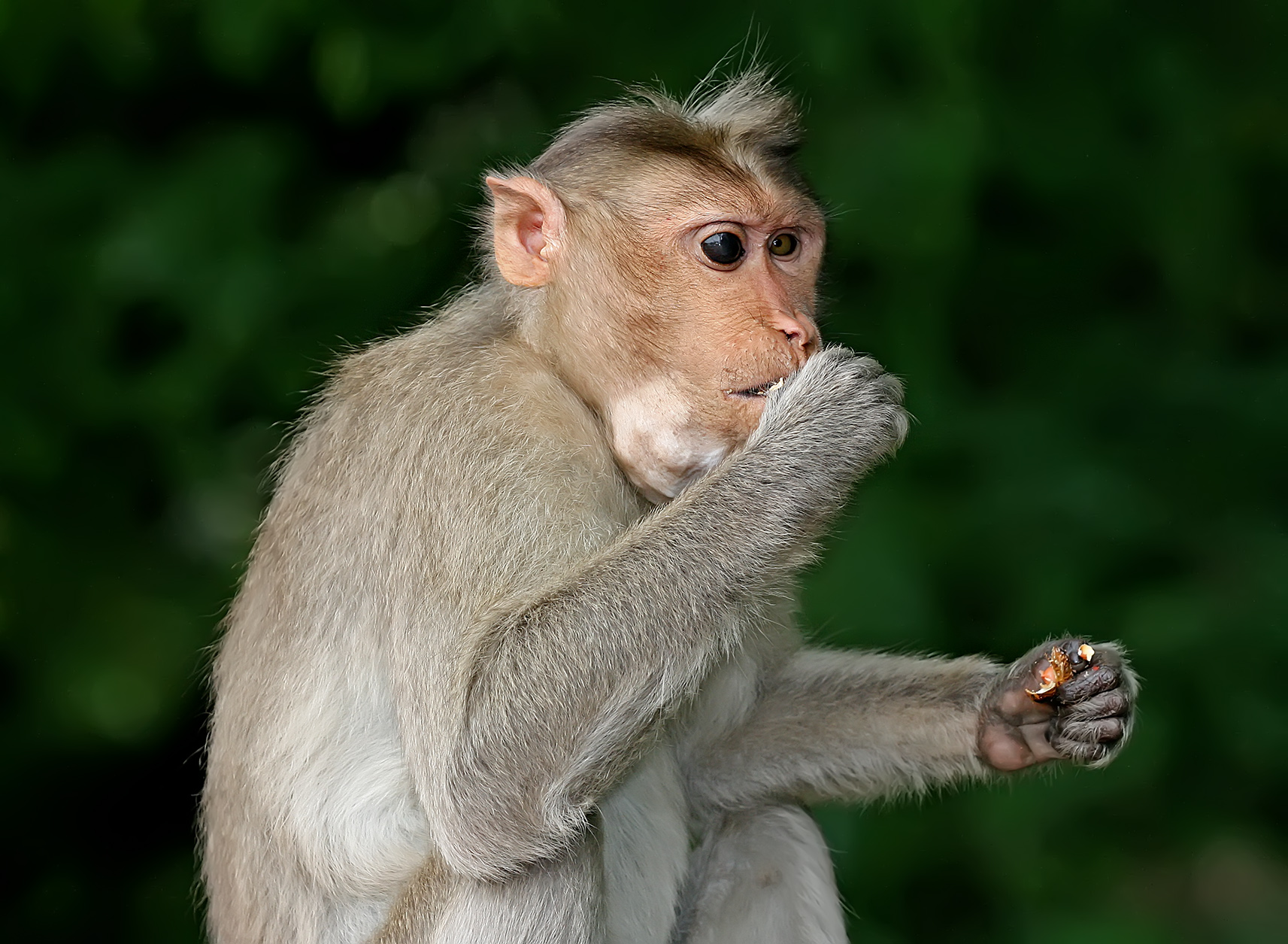
A crab-eating macaque. Such monkeys are frequently found roaming in the forested Bukit Timah rainforest

Monkeys are often seen roaming about and encountered by visitors in the Bukit Timah Nature Reserve, and the crab-eating macaque monkeys in particular bear similarities to the descriptions of the Monkey Man. The clearest distinction between the two would be in size; the crab-eating macaques are typically 38–55 cm (15–22 in) in body length, while the BTM's height is said to be between 1–2 m (3 ft 3 in – 6 ft 7 in) on average. Height perception, however, may also be influenced by factors such as darkness and angular perception.

== In popular culture ==
As a well known cultural trope in modern Singapore, the Bukit Timah Monkey Man has featured in a variety of contemporary media representations including:

- Bones (season 6), Episode 18 - "The Truth In The Myth" features a scene whereby characters Booth and Brennan arrive at a studio, and Beamis is talking about the Bukit Timah Monkey Man, an immortal hominid that lives in the forests of Singapore.
- Project Mending Sky, a contemporary art installation uses the Bukit Timah Monkey Man as a framing device.
- Searching for 'Singapore's Bigfoot': Step inside the city's mysterious forest, an official Singapore Tourist Board promotion on Bukit Timah Monkey Man sighting tours, aimed at the Australian market.
- Jack and Jill at Bukit Timah Hill, a Singaporean modern children's book re-imagining traditional nursery rhymes with local twists including the Bukit Timah Monkey Man .
- The Mystery of the Bukit Timah Monkey boy, a Singapore National Library Board initiative promoting Bukit Timah Monkey Man reading material to the young adult market.
- In Search Of The Bukit Timah Monkey Man, a short film project by Singaporean artists NADA and Brandon Tay that revisits the legendary creature.
- Local Ghost Stories and Urban Legends, a Time Out list of the best known Singaporean urban legends, including the Monkey Man.

== See also ==
- Monkey-man of New Delhi
- Orang Mawas (Malaysia)
- Orang Pendek (Sumatra)
- Ebu gogo (Flores)
