= John G. Fleagle =

American anthropologist and primatologist

- Education: Yale University, Harvard University (M.S., Ph.D.)
- Scientific career
- Fields: Anthropology, Primatology
- Workplaces: Stony Brook University
- Doctoral students: Jeffrey Meldrum

John G. Fleagle is an American anthropologist, primatologist, and Distinguished Professor at State University of New York, Stony Brook.

== Education ==
He graduated from Yale University cum laude in 1971, and from Harvard University with a M.S. in Anthropology in 1973, and from Harvard University, with a Ph.D. in Biological Anthropology in 1976.

== Awards ==
- 2023 Charles Darwin Lifetime Achievement Award
- 1988 MacArthur Fellows Program
- 1982 Guggenheim Fellowship

== Works ==
A selection of Fleagle's works is listed below.

- Fleagle J.G, Simons E.L (October 1982), "The humerus of Aegyptopithecus zeuxis: a primitive anthropoid", American Journal of Physical Anthropology, 59 (2): 175–93, doi:10.1002/ajpa.1330590207, PMID 6816072
- Anthropoid origins, Editors John G. Fleagle, Richard F. Kay, Plenum Press, 1994, ISBN 978-0-306-44791-4
- Primate communities, Editors John G. Fleagle, Charles Helmar Janson, Kaye E. Reed, Cambridge University Press, 1999, ISBN 978-0-521-62967-6
- Primate adaptation and evolution, Academic Press, 2nd edition 1999, ISBN 9780122603419; 3rd edition 2013 ISBN 978-0-12-378632-6
- Primate biogeography: progress and prospects, editors Shawn M. Lehman, John G. Fleagle, Springer, 2006, ISBN 978-0-387-29871-9
- Elwyn Simons: a search for origins, Editors John G. Fleagle, Christopher C. Gilbert, Springer, 2007, ISBN 978-0-387-73895-6
