= Amomongo =

Philippine mythological figure

- Member of Cryptid
- Other names: Orang Mawas, Impakta
- Gender: Male/female
- Region: Philippines

In Philippine folklore, the Amomongo is a cryptid described as a hairy, man-sized ape with long nails. The name is probably derived from the Hiligaynon word amó, which translates to "ape" or "monkey". Residents of La Castellana in Negros Occidental view the Amomongo as a violent, wild creature that lives in caves near the foot of the volcanic Mount Kanlaon. Amomongo is featured in a local folktale called "Amomongo and Iput-Iput," or "The Ape and the Firefly". The name Amomongo has also been translated to "gorilla", though this is not an animal native to the region.

On 9 June 2008, Amomongo supposedly attacked Elias Galvez and Salvador Aguilar of the La Castellana settlement and disemboweled numerous goats and chickens in the area for the purposes of eating the entrails. Attacks lasted until the next day on 10 June. Medical records reveal that Galvez and Aguilar sustained numerous scratches on their faces, backs, and abdomens. Residents described it as a "hairy white ape with long, sharp nails and stands 5 feet 4 inches [1.6 m] tall". Some compare the creature to other ape-like cryptids around the world, such as Bigfoot or the Yeti; however, the scientific community holds that it is just a legend mixed with mistaken identity. The native community claims that it is a wild animal, not an intelligent being like a witch or aswang.
