= Orang Mawas =

Cryptid in Malaysian folklore

In Malay folklore, the Orang Mawas or Mawas (also known as the Orang Dalam) is an entity reported to inhabit the jungle of Johor (Malaysia) and in Singapore.

== Description ==
It is described as being about 2.4–3 m (7 ft 10 in – 9 ft 10 in) tall, bipedal and covered in black fur, and has been reported feeding on fish and raiding orchards.

== Sightings ==
There have been many sightings of the creature, which the local Orang Asli people call hantu jarang gigi, which translates as "Snaggle-toothed Ghost". Recorded claims of Mawas sightings date back to 1871.

Some speculate the creature may be a surviving Gigantopithecus (or at least a folk memory of the animal), while the scientific community tends to dismiss the sightings as misidentified sun bears. Similar creatures are reported in other countries in southeast Asia, such as the Muwa in the Philippines or the Butnak (Thai: บุดนาก) in southern Thailand.

In Sumatra, mawas (sometimes maias) is common name for the orangutan.

== See also ==
- Bukit Timah Monkey Man
- Orang Pendek
- Ebu gogo
- Yeren
- Yowie
- Monkey-man of Delhi
