= Jeffrey Meldrum =

American anthropologist (1958–2025)

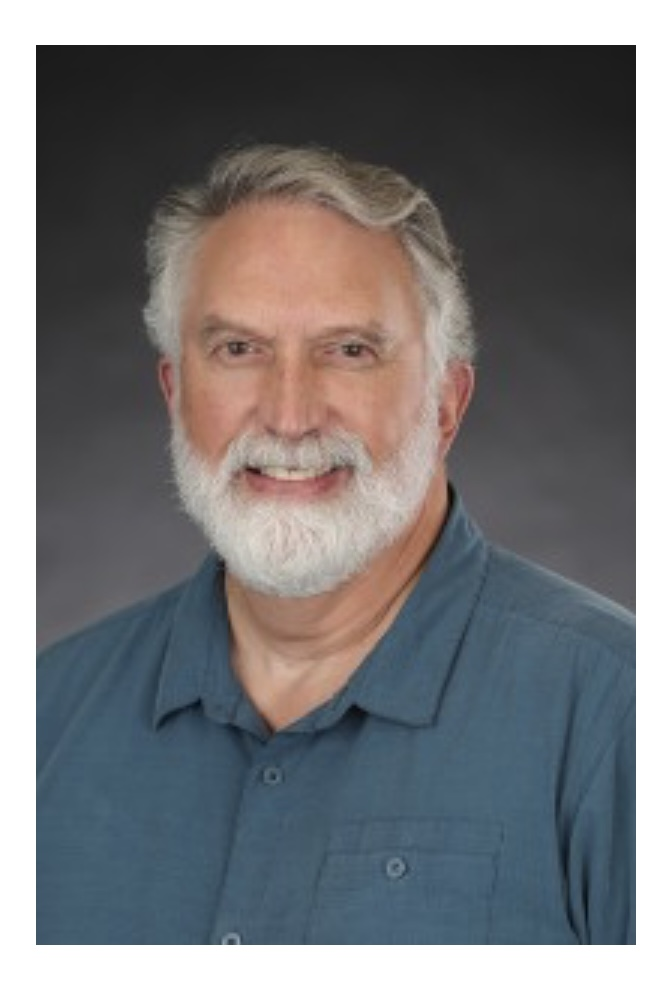
- Born: Don Jeffrey Meldrum; May 24, 1958; Salt Lake City, Utah, U.S.
- Died: September 9, 2025 (aged 67); Pocatello, Idaho, U.S.
- Education: Brigham Young University (B.S., M.S.); Stony Brook University (Ph.D.)
- Occupation: Anthropologist
- Scientific career
- Workplaces: Duke University; Northwestern University; Idaho State University
- Thesis: Terrestrial adaptations in the feet of African cercopithecines (1989)
- Doctoral advisor: John G. Fleagle

Don Jeffrey Meldrum (24 May 1958 – 9 September 2025) was an American anthropologist and academic. He was a full professor of Anatomy and Anthropology in the Department of Biological Sciences at Idaho State University. He was also adjunct professor in the Department of Physical and Occupational Therapy and the Department of Anthropology. He was an expert on foot morphology and locomotion in primates.

== Early life ==
Don Jeffrey Meldrum was born on 24 May 1958 in Salt Lake City. He received his B.S. in zoology specializing in vertebrate locomotion at Brigham Young University in 1982, and his M.S. at BYU in 1984. In 1989, he completed a Ph.D. at Stony Brook University in anatomical sciences, with an emphasis in biological anthropology, with John G. Fleagle as his doctoral advisor.

== Career ==
Meldrum the position of postdoctoral visiting assistant professor at Duke University Medical Center from 1989 to 1991. Meldrum worked at Northwestern University's Department of Cell, Molecular and Structural Biology for a short while in 1993 before joining the faculty of Idaho State University where he taught until his death.

Meldrum published numerous academic papers ranging from vertebrate evolutionary morphology, the emergence of bipedal locomotion in modern humans, and the plausibility behind the Sasquatch phenomena, in addition to being a co-editor of a series of books on paleontology. Meldrum also co-edited From Biped to Strider: The Emergence of Modern Human Walking with Charles E. Hilton.

Meldrum, who was an "active member" of the Church of Jesus Christ of Latter-day Saints, also studied and commented upon issues of genetics and the Book of Mormon in his book Who Are the Children of Lehi?, written with Trent D. Stephens.

=== Cryptozoology ===
Meldrum attracted media attention due to his interest in Bigfoot. Meldrum believed that Bigfoot exists, and his research on the topic has been criticized by some as pseudoscientific. Meldrum authored Sasquatch: Legend Meets Science in 2006. The book was heavily criticized in a detailed review in the Skeptical Inquirer. Anthropologist David J. Daegling commented that the author was "unable or unwilling to distinguish good research from bad, science from pseudoscience", and felt that the book failed to provide a thorough scientific analysis. Matt Cartmill reviewed the book in the American Journal of Physical Anthropology.

Meldrum was present at a 2011 conference in Siberia regarding the Siberian Snowman, which included investigating alleged footprints that had been spotted in a Kemerovo cave. He acknowledged that the results of the Russian field trip to the cave site were most likely fraudulent. He suggested that the supposed evidence found was simply an attempt by local government officials to drum up publicity.

Meldrum was interviewed by director Marq Evans for the 2026 documentary film, Capturing Bigfoot, for his expertise on the famed Patterson-Gimlin film, which depicts an unknown subject, claimed by the filmmakers to be a Bigfoot, walking through a wooded area.

== Death ==
Meldrum died in Pocatello, Idaho, after a brief battle with brain cancer, at the age of 67, in 2025. His date of death is reported variously as 9 September and 10 September.
