= Menk =

Forest spirit of Khanty and Mansi mythology

In Khanty and Mansi folklore, the Menk is a forest spirit of these peoples' mythology. The Khanty and Mansi are Indigenous people living in the Khanty-Mansi Autonomous Okrug of Russia.

== Mythology ==
The menk is part of the Siberian oral tradition. These beliefs were retained by the Khanty and Mansi people, even though they became, or were compelled to become Russian Orthodox Christians in the 17th and 18th centuries. In the Khanty epics, the menk are presented as "formidable forest spirits". The Hero-Prince typically inflicts many "pseudo-deaths" on a menk until he is able to inflict a "total death". Menk are protected by gods who intervene to prevent their deaths, however the laws of the gods can be bypassed by humans. In the epics, menk occur in sevens, such as seven menk from one mother, or seven menk with one soul. According to the mythology, menk's eyes cannot look down, so the Hero-Princes often attack them from below while fighting in rivers.

In Khanty mythology, local people of Por ancestry are aligned with menk, who they believe to be "just like humans, only spirits of the parallel forest world".

== Popular culture ==
According to skeptical investigator Benjamin Radford, a 2014 Discovery Channel program that suggested a menk was responsible for deaths in the Dyatlov Pass incident is "a textbook example of modern cable TV mystery-mongering".
