= Orang Pendek =

Creature from Indonesian folklore

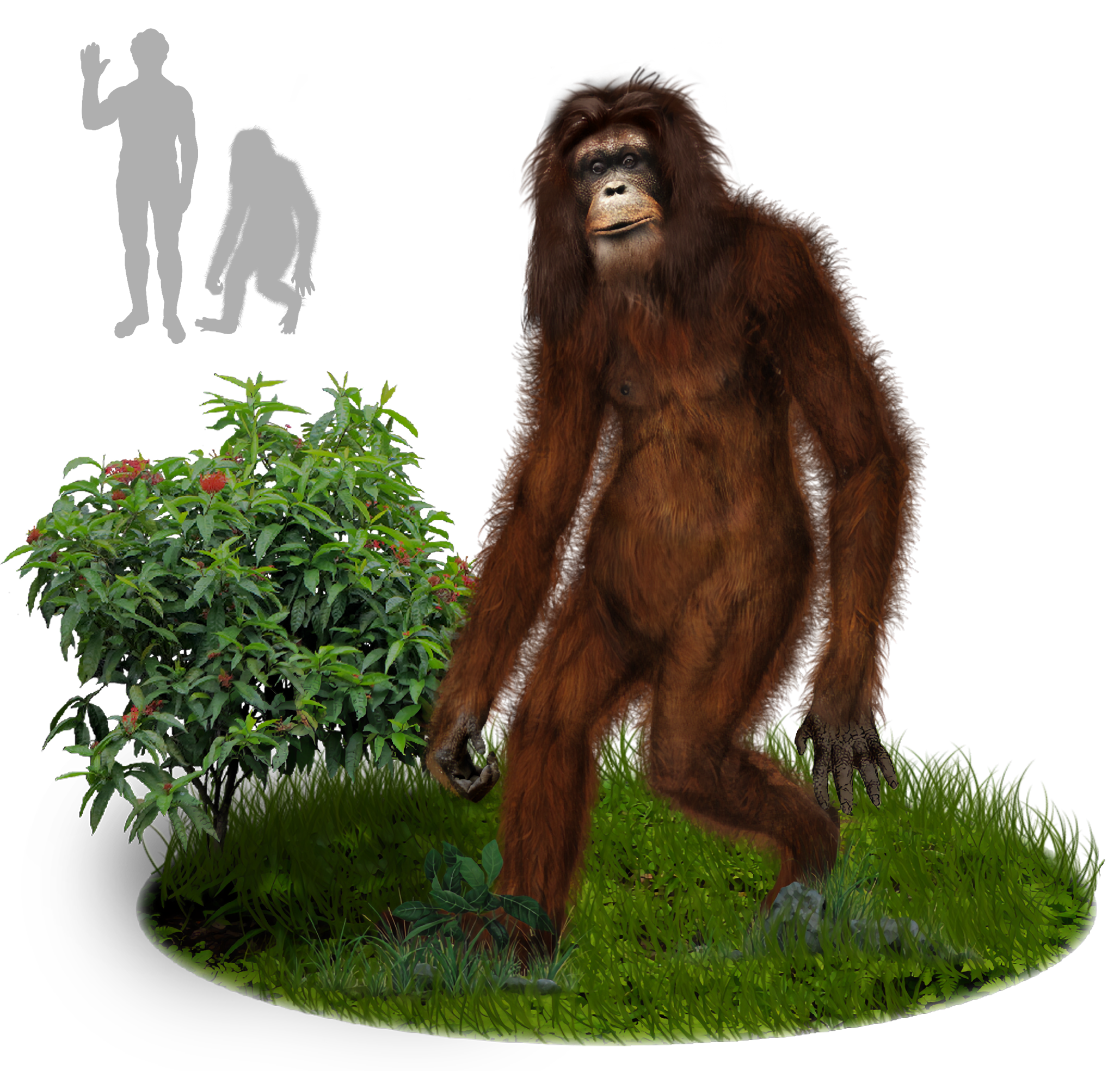
- Artist's impression of the Orang Pendek

Creature information
- Other name: Short Person (translation)

Origin
- Country: Indonesia
- Region: Sumatra
- Habitat: Tropical rainforest

In Indonesian folklore, the Orang Pendek (Indonesian for 'short person') is the most common name given to a creature said to inhabit remote, mountainous forests on the island of Sumatra. The creature has allegedly been seen and documented for at least 100 years by forest tribes, local villagers, Dutch colonists along with Western scientists and travelers. Consensus among witnesses is that the primate is a ground-dwelling, bipedal ape covered in short fur, standing between 80 and 150 cm (31.5 and 59 in) tall.

== Location ==
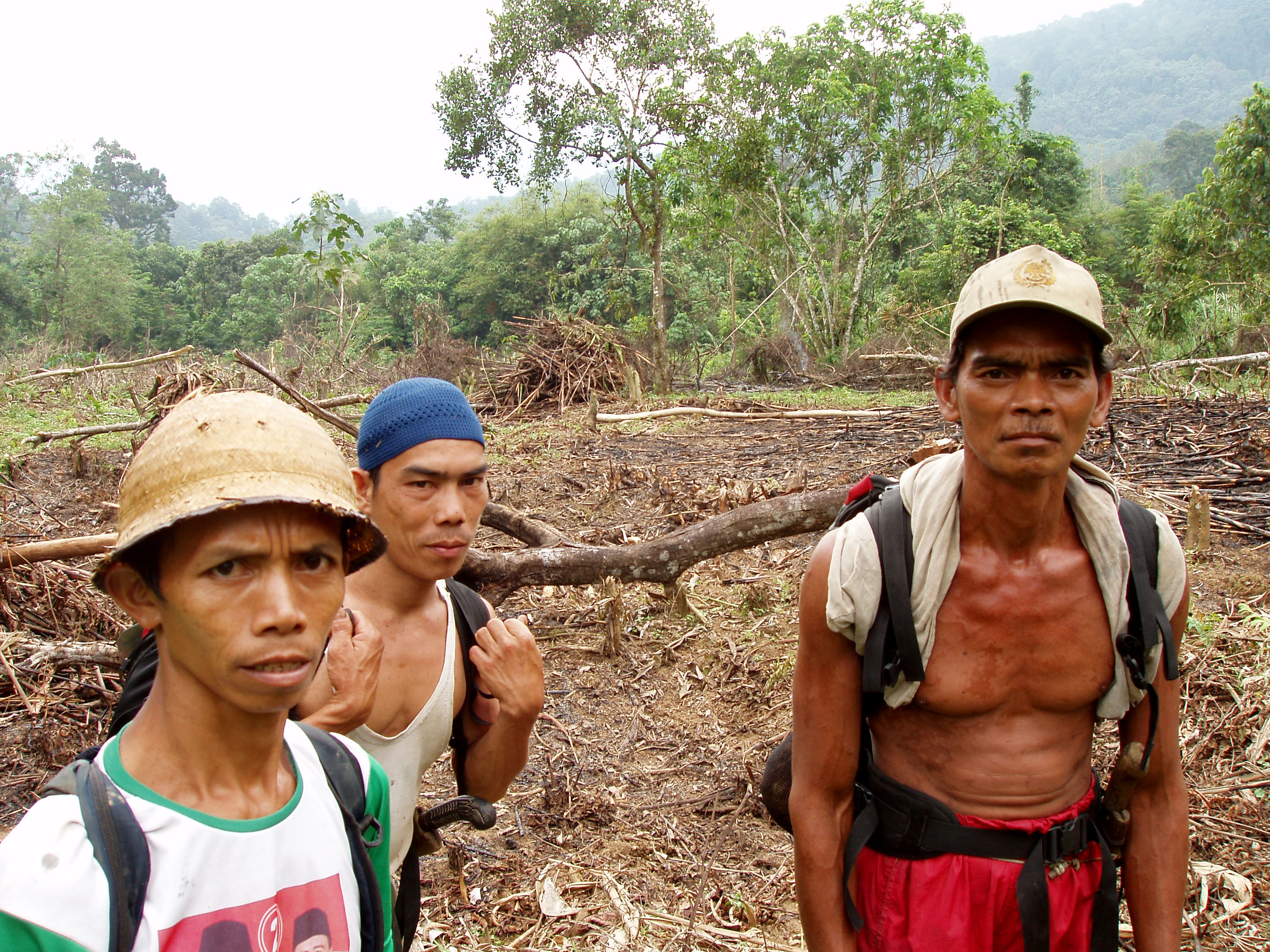
Farmers near newly cleared land within Kerinci Seblat National Park, Sumatra

While Orang Pendek and similar animals have historically been said to dwell in the landscapes of Sumatra in Indonesia, and Southeast Asia, claimed sightings have occurred largely within the Kerinci Regency of central Sumatra and especially within the borders of Kerinci Seblat National Park (Taman Nasional Kerinci Seblat or TNKS). The park, 2° south of the equator, is located within the Bukit Barisan mountain range and features some of the most remote primary rainforest in the world. Habitat types within the park include lowland dipterocarp rainforest, montane forests, and volcanic alpine formations on Mount Kerinci, the second highest peak in Indonesia.

== Attestations ==
The following sources make reference to the purported creature:

=== Suku Anak Dalam ===
The Suku Anak Dalam ("Children of the Inner-forest") – also known as Orang Kubu, Orang Batin Simbilan, or Orang Rimba – are groups of nomadic people who have traditionally lived throughout the lowland forests of Jambi and South Sumatra. According to their legends, Orang Pendek has been a part of their world and a co-inhabitant of the forest for centuries.

In Bukit Duabelas, the Orang Rimba speak of a creature, known as "Hantu Pendek", whose description closely matches that of Orang Pendek. However, Hantu Pendek is thought of more as a supernatural entity or demon rather than an animal, with the name translating to "short ghost". According to the Orang Rimba, the Hantu Pendek travel in groups of five or six, subsisting on wild yams and hunting animals with small axes. Accounts of the creature claim it ambushes unfortunate Orang Rimba hunters traveling alone in the forest. Along the Makekal River on the western edge of Bukit Duabelas, people recount a legend of how their ancestors outsmarted these cunning yet dim-witted creatures during a hunting trip, and the story is often used to boast of their intellect and reason.

=== Dutch colonists ===
Dutch settlers in the early 20th century provided Westerners with their modern introduction to Orang Pendek-like animals in Sumatra. One account in particular is widely reported:

- Mr van Heerwarden, who described an encounter he had while surveying land in 1923:

I discovered a dark and hairy creature on a branch... The sedapa was also hairy on the front of its body; the colour there was a little lighter than on the back. The very dark hair on its head fell to just below the shoulder-blades or even almost to the waist... Had it been standing, its arms would have reached to a little above its knees; they were therefore long, but its legs seemed to me rather short. I did not see its feet, but I did see some toes which were shaped in a very normal manner... There was nothing repulsive or ugly about its face, nor was it at all apelike.

== See also ==
- Bukit Timah Monkey Man
- Homo floresiensis
- Homo luzonensis
- Orang Mawas
- Ebu gogo
- Yeren
- Orangutan
