= Mapinguari =

Legendary cryptid in the Amazon

Artistic representation of the Mapinguari

The Mapinguari or Mapinguary is a cryptid from Brazilian folklore. The Mapinguari is often described as an extremely foul-smelling, hairy animal that is distinct from the North American Bigfoot. Descriptions further allege that the cryptid is a man-eating creature with hook-shaped nails, backwards-facing feet, a bipedal gait, a gaping mouth in its abdomen, and a single eye like the mythological Cyclops.

== Names and etymology ==
Câmara Cascudo identified the name Mapinguari as deriving from the Tupi-Guarani mbaé-pi-guari (Guarani: mba'e "that, the thing" + pĭ "foot" + guarî "crooked, twisted") meaning "the thing that has a clubbed, twisted, or backwards-turned foot".

The Mapinguari is known to the Karitiana people of Brazil as Kida harara (Karitiâna: "laughing beast"), Kida so'emo ("beast with black face") or Owoj/Owojo (lit. "maternal grandfather" or "mother's brother's son").

Author Margo DeMello has related the Mapinguari to the Segamai, a legendary creature appearing in accounts shared by the Matsigenka people of Peru. Ethnologist Glenn H. Shepard, who collected testimonies about the Segamai, instead identified a different Matsigenka mythical creature as equivalent to the Mapinguari, called the Oshetoniro ("mother of spider monkeys"). This is a large monkey-like creature possessing "demonic powers and gigantic penises. They can summon wind and darkness, cause panic and confusion, and are said to rape and kill human victims".

The Juma has been cited as another name of the Mapinguari. Candace Slater distinguishes the two as different beings, though grouped together as types of Curupiras.

== Description ==
The Mapinguari was believed to haunt the forests of Pará, Amazonas, and Acre into the 20th century.

Descriptions of the alleged creature portray a giant monkey with a likewise simian face, backwards-oriented donkey-like hooves, and a large mouth split from nose to stomach. (Note: Silva Campos (1928) Brasil, pp. 321–322,.) It is purportedly hairy like a spider monkey, possessing long red, brown, or black hair, which is claimed to be dense enough to render the animal effectively bulletproof save only the area near the navel, which is further alleged to be the only place vulnerable to gunshots. The creature's size has been depicted as either comparable to a human, or larger. (Note: Silva Campos (1928) Brasil, pp. 321–322,.) Different or additional defense features may also be present. In Acre, the Mapinguari were said to have a crocodilian-like hard-shelled skin, and feet shaped like the end of a pestle or Brazil nut capsules. (Note: Francisco Peres de Lima (1938) Folclore acreano, p. 103 apud Cascudo) In Tefé, Amazonas, a Mapinguari was described as having a shell similar to a turtle's.

The other recurring feature of the Mapinguari is a large, single eye in either the abdomen or the forehead, like a Cyclops. A typical description is found among the Mura people, with a single eye on the head and a large vertical mouth on the belly.

The Mapinguari is a man-eater that eats its victims head-first. It chews its victim's head slowly, as though it were chewing tobacco. It is variously said to be nocturnal, crepuscular, or diurnal, and to lay in wait in the dim light of the deep forest before lunging to attack. It announces itself with loud screaming, frightening humans into flight, although Cascudo suspected this part to be relatively recent lore, as it was mentioned by 20th century rubber tappers but not in the literature of the colonial period. The Mapinguari may also scream while retreating into the forest after having been attacked itself, even without having been injured.

Although it is commonly claimed that the Mapinguari only devours the head, (Note: Cascudo: "Mas devora somente a cabeça") one testimony described the creature devouring an entire body piecemeal: the head, then the limbs, then the entrails, and finally the torso of a man. Cascudo also noted that the Mapinguari can tear its victim's flesh into large pieces.

A rubber tapper (seringueiro) quoted in 1928 claimed that he had gone hunting in the woods while his workmate remained in their shared hut for the Sunday. When the rubber tapper returned to their dwellings, he found his companion being devoured by the Mapinguari, which had jaguar-like claws and a mouth "as large as a lapel", reaching from the face to the stomach. This tale frames the Mapinguari as a punishment for breaking Sabbath, and exhibits Christian influence as a result. The hunter leaves the hut arguing that "one goes hungry even on a Sunday", or "one still must eat on Sunday". Conversely, Mapinguari deliberately chooses a holiday or Sunday to hunt its victims, putting the people that remain active in such days at risk.

Ornithologist David C. Oren noted that the voice of the Mapinguari is said to be loud yet similar to a human screaming, or alternatively, akin to thunder. In a break with the classic portrayal of the Mapinguari as a predator, Oren pointed to claims that the Mapinguari twists bacaba palm trees to the ground and feeds on the palm heart and its berry-like fruit.

In Acre, it was said that Indigenous people who attain an advanced age transform into Mapinguari. (Note: Francisco Peres de Lima (1938) Folclore acreano, p. 103 apud Cascudo) The idea that men who grow exceedingly old turn into Mapinguari was shared by the Macuna people of Colombia and the natives of the Yotahy River, the latter of whom would reportedly kill the elderly before they could turn into Mapinguari. An indigenous chief (tuixaua) claimed that the Mapinguari was "the ancient king of the region". Separate folklore describes the Mapinguari as a former human shaman.

Mapinguari dung is claimed to resemble the droppings of a horse.

== Related mythological beings ==
Cascudo suggested that the Mapinguari did not arise at once but was a composite of the Gorjala (a giant), the Pé de Garrafa ("bottle footed"), the Curupira (invulnerability, backwards feet), and the Matutiú (black-haired, long-armed, and clawed giant).

Although a legend rooted in the folklore of the Indigenous peoples of Brazil, the Mapinguari shares several similarities with the Afro-Brazilian Quibungo. Both are claimed to result from a man growing exceedingly old and transforming into a monster, both are further portrayed as possessing a large, vertical, gaping mouth stretching from the face to the stomach, and both are ultimately depicted as hairy monsters that eat people. It has been proposed that Mapinguari folklore incorporated the idea of having a large vertical mouth from the Quibungo. While the Mapinguari is depicted almost invariably as possessing a mouth that extends from the face to the stomach, the mouth of the Quibungo is variously reported as stretching from the nose or the throat to the stomach, or even being found on its back.

The Mapinguari is one of many folkloric creatures around the world that are described as possessing backwards feet, leaving prints that confuse hunters attempting to track them. This same feature has been given to mythical human tribes like the Caapora in Brazil, Máguare in Venezuela, Cauá in Bolivia, and Chudiachaque in Peru.

Besides the Cyclops of Greek mythology, a single eye like that depicted on the Mapinguari has also been assigned to the European Ogre, and other fantastic beings of Brazilian folklore including the Labatut, Capelobo, and Curupira.

== Notable sightings ==
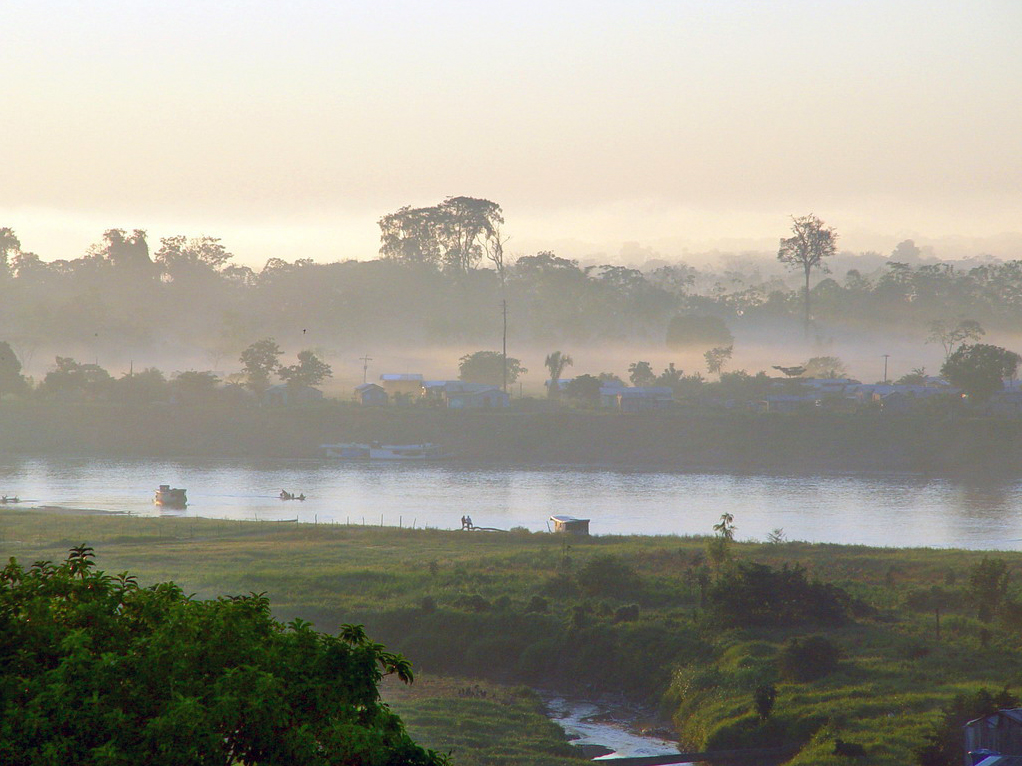
The Rio Juruá, bordering the rainforests where some Mapinguari sightings have allegedly occurred.

One of the earliest alleged sightings of the Mapinguari supposedly occurred in 1930, when an explorer named Inocêncio or Inocèncio claimed he encountered an upright animal, which he shot, whilst lost in the jungles around the Uatumã River. The eyewitness was later interviewed by Bernard Heuvelmans. A slightly later report, from 1937, claimed that a Mapinguari had gone on a three-week rampage in central Brazil, killing hundreds of cows and tearing out their tongues. As of 2001, David Oren had spoken to between fifty and eighty indigenous Brazilians, rubber planters, and miners who claimed to have seen, and seven hunters who claimed to have shot, Mapinguari or other unknown animals with which Oren equates the Mapinguari, in or near Eirunepé, Manicoré, and Carauarí in Amazonas; Marabá in Pará; the Parque Nacional da Serra do Divisor in Acre; Juína in Mato Grosso; and Tocantins. The seven hunters all claimed not to have saved any remains due to their terrible odour, which made them nauseous and light-headed. Some Kanamari people living in the Rio Juruá Valley claimed to have raised a pair of infant Mapinguari on bananas and milk for two years, until their smell became unbearable and they were released. A Karitiana hunter named Geovaldo also claimed to have either run from or shot a kida harara in the jungle near his village in Rondônia in 2003 or 2004.

== Cryptozoology ==
Bernard Heuvelmans (1958) speculated that the Mapinguari was an unknown primate, akin to Bigfoot. (Note: Paleontologist Richard Cerutti (private communication to Oren).) Likewise, Câmara Cascudo (1962) noted close similarity between the Mapinguari and the Mongolian "Wild Man" or Kümün Görügesü, also known by its Russian name Almas. The original folkloric description of the Mapinguari, alongside the early reports of cow-killing and the testimony of Inocêncio, led cryptozoologists including Bernard Heuvelmans and Ivan T. Sanderson to regard the Mapinguari as a possible New World great ape similar to Bigfoot.

Mário Monteiro (1977) posited that the Mapinguari was based on the Andean or spectacled bear, which is said to "hug" its victims.

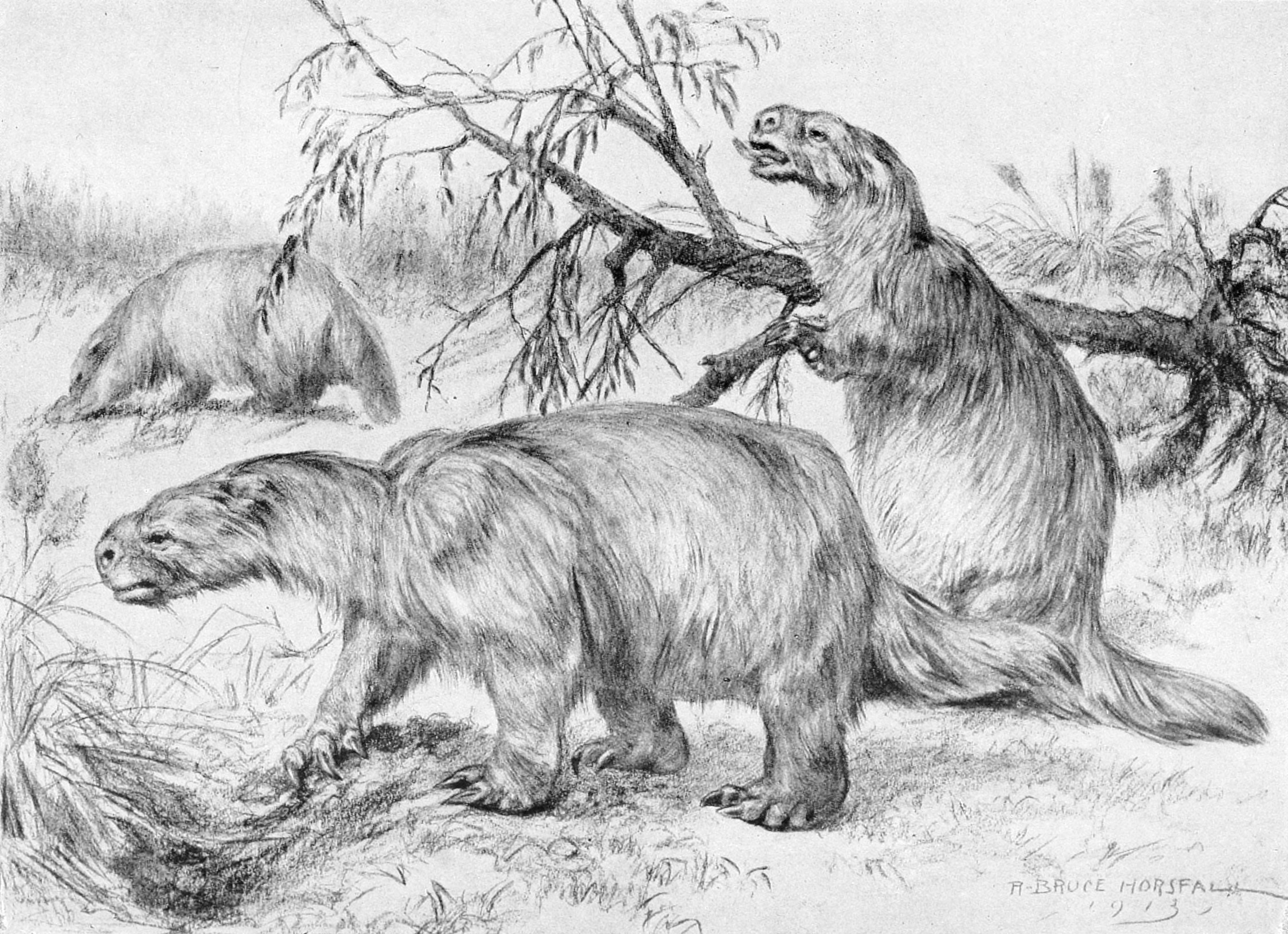
1915 restoration of the ground sloth Glossotherium robustum.

In a 1993 paper, David C. Oren suggested that the Mapinguari might be based on recent sightings of an extinct ground sloth. His theory first favored a small sized mylodontid about 1.8 metres (5.9 ft) tall, then a megalonychid after collecting more testimonies, due to claims of the animal having four canine-like teeth. Oren recorded tales of recent hunting of Mapinguari during his research in the Tapajós river basin between the 1970s and the 1990s, including claims of hunters who had kept hair and claws of this animal before discarding them due to the stench, which was compared to a mixture of feces and rotten flesh. One of Oren's arguments for a ground sloth identification was that mylodontid ground sloths are known to have had multiple layers of protective osteoderms in the skin of their shoulders, back, and thighs, and also very thick and close ribs in their chest, leaving the belly as the only unarmored spot. This would account for the Mapinguari being regarded as invulnerable to projectile weapons except in the belly, eye, or mouth during vocalizations. Oren dismissed claims of Mapinguari having a single eye, considering such accounts the result of Portuguese colonial influence leading to the incorporation of elements from European mythological monsters. This same point had been previously raised by Cascudo despite his not having considered ground sloths as a possible origin for the Mapinguari. In the native testimonies collected by Oren, the creature was said to have a monkey-like face instead, with a muzzle similar to a horse's, except shorter. Oren's hypothesis was received with criticism by other scientists.

Ethnologist Gerard H. Shepard (2002) also identified the Oshetoniro of the Matsigenka with a folk memory of a ground sloth. In the same essay compilation, Manuel Lizarralde compared the Mapinguari to the legendary red-colored "giant monkey" Shaaroba of the Barí people of Colombia and Venezuela, described either as a 500–800-kilogram (1,100–1,800 lb) animal similar to a spider monkey with jaguar-like claws, or a cross between a cow and a jaguar. Lizarralde reasoned that this could be another memory of a ground sloth, because the Barí call not only primates monos (the Spanish word for monkeys) but also non-primate tree-climbing mammals like the kinkajou and olingo, raising the possibility that they could also include sloths. According to Oren, peri-Amazonian peoples in contact with spectacled bears regard the bear and the Mapinguari as very different animals, despite their similar size.

Long before Oren, the Argentinian paleontologist Florentino Ameghino (1898) believed that ground sloths were still alive in South America. Ameghino based this opinion on a piece of ostensibly fresh pelt belonging to a ground sloth that was found in a cave in Última Esperanza Province, Chile, and the testimony of explorer Ramón Lista, who claimed to have shot at a hairy pangolin-like creature without scales while in Santa Cruz Province, Argentina, though unable to injure it. This pelt indeed belonged to a mylodontid ground sloth, but was later dated to the late Pleistocene, around 13,200 years ago.

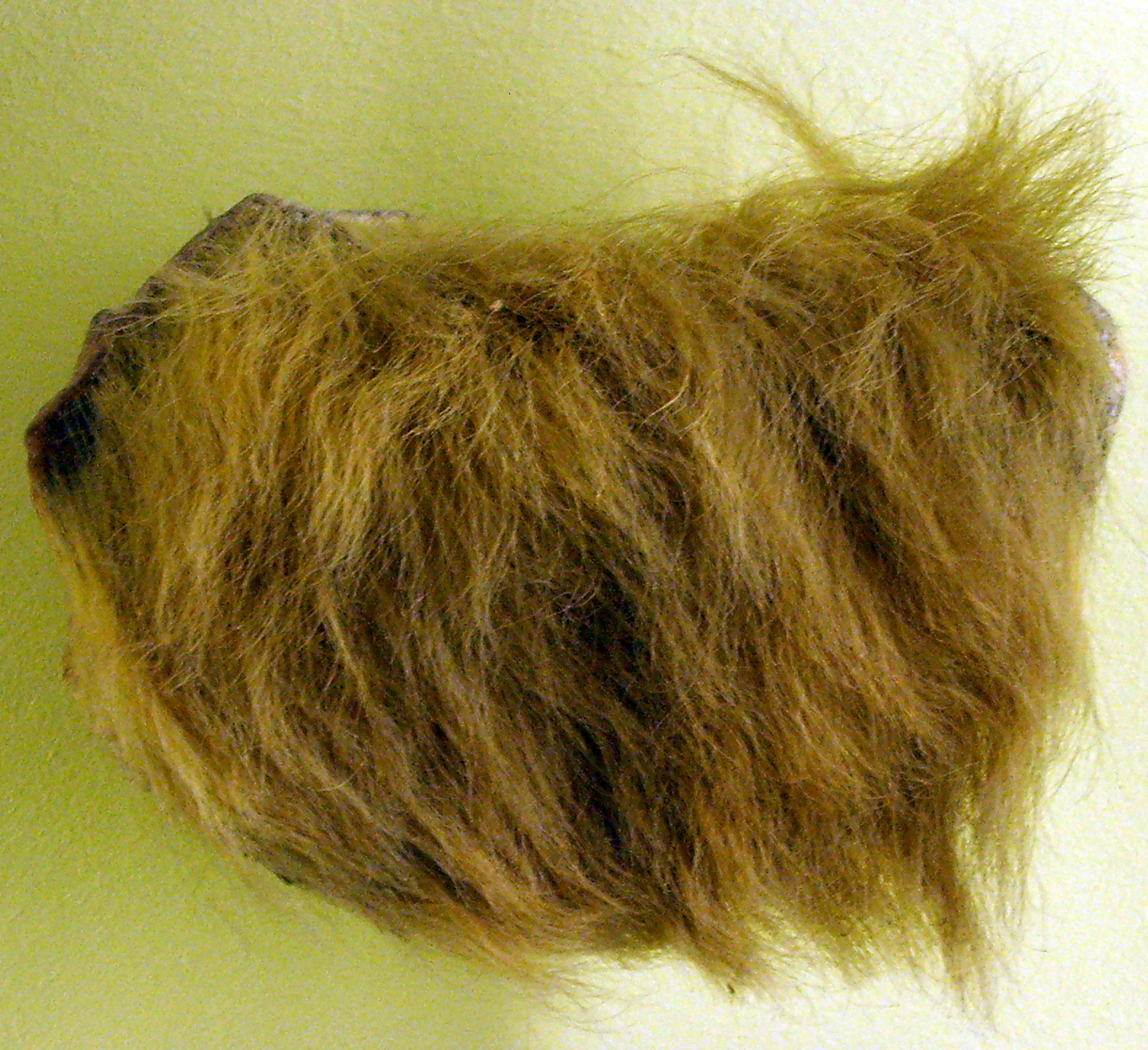
Preserved skin of Mylodon, including long reddish hair.

Geobiologist Paul S. Martin (2005) argued against any credible possibility of ground sloth survival, pointing out that no ground sloth remains had been found in Holocene fossil records. However, a number of ground sloth species are now known to have survived into the early Holocene. These include one mylodontid, Glossotherium robustum, whose reconstructed range extended into the Amazonian region.

Like living tree sloths, ground sloths had laterally rotated feet that impeded their ability to run, which might account for the twisted feet repeatedly attributed to the Mapinguari. They also possessed long claws, thought to have been used to grasp vegetation for feeding and also for self-defense, which could also account for the Mapinguari's jaguar-like claws. Unlike the Mapinguari, ground sloths have long been interpreted as strictly herbivorous animals, hypothesized to have been specialized browsers, grazers, and mixed feeders (browsers and grazers). Nevertheless, a 2021 study indicated that at least one of the most recent ground sloths, the mylodontid Mylodon, was likely omnivorous.

In 1995, artifacts were discovered consisting of giant sloth osteoderms "modified into primordial pendants” which, according to a 2023 academic study, suggested that humans lived in South America contemporaneously with giant sloths and crafted these items between 25,000 and 27,000 years ago. As the last ground sloths didn't become extinct until several millennia later, journalists speculated that they may very well have "served as inspiration for the Mapinguari, a mythical beast that, in Amazonian legend, had the nasty habit of twisting off the heads of humans and devouring them".

== See also ==
- Mapinguari National Park
- List of legendary creatures
