= List of lake monsters =

The list of lake and river monsters attested in worldwide folklore.

== The list ==
Body of water	Area	Nation	Continent	Name(s)	Description	First and last reported sightings	Notes
Palmital Ravine, Anaga	Tenerife	Spain	Europe	Anguila peluda	Monstrous hairy eel; with a head covered in hair and a threatening malice in its gaze.		
Alkali Lake	Nebraska	USA	North America	Alkali Lake Monster	40-foot-long (12 m) alligator-like creature with rough, grayish-brown skin and a horn-like appendage located between its eyes and nostrils.		
Aluminé Lake, Limay River	Neuquén Province	Argentina	South America	Nguruvilu	Fox-headed aquatic snake		
Altamaha River	Georgia (U.S. state)	USA	North America	Altamaha-ha	30-foot (9.1 m) long with a snake-like head and flippers like a seal		
Memaloose Lake	Oregon	USA	North America	Amhuluk	Serpentine with horns		Kalapuya Legend
Fulk Lake	Indiana	USA	North America	Beast of 'Busco, Oscar the Turtle	Giant Snapping Turtle	1898–1948	
Lake Erie	Ohio	USA	North America	Bessie, South Bay Bessie	Snake-like and 30 to 40 ft (9.1 to 12.2 m) long, at least a foot (30 cm) in diameter, with a grayish color.		
Erie Canal	New York	USA	North America	Canal Monster	Giant snake-like creature	1910-2006	Said to grab pets and small children into the canal.
Black River	New York	USA	North America	Black River Monster	Dark-colored serpentine body with flippers and large bulging eyes	1951–	
Lake Dillon	Colorado	USA	North America	Blue Dilly	Manta ray-like creature		
Lake Mendota	Wisconsin	USA	North America	Bozho	Serpentine creature, sometimes taken for a log until it moves.	circa 1860–????	Said to play 'pranks' such as chasing boats and tickling bathers' feet. Namesake of local arts & culture news website.
Brosno Lake	Tver Oblast	Russia	Europe	Brosno Dragon, Brosnya			
Lake Khaiyr	Sakha	Russia	Asia	Lake Khaiyr Monster			
Labynkyr Lake	Sakha	Russia	Asia	Labynkyr Devil or Labynkyrsky Chert	Various descriptions - possibly 26 feet (7.9 m) long		
Various swamps, billabongs, creeks, riverbeds and waterholes across Australia	Victoria	Australia	Australia	Bunyip	Variously described as having a round head, an elongated neck, and a body resembling that of an ox, hippopotamus, or manatee.		Part of traditional Aboriginal beliefs and stories throughout Australia
Lake Champlain	New York Vermont; Quebec	Canada; USA	North America	Champ	A reptilian creature with slimy gray skin, 20 to 40 feet (6.1 to 12.2 m) in length, with a long neck, a horselike head, and four flippers.		
Charles Mill Lake	Ohio	USA	North America	Charles Mill Lake Monster	Armless reptilian with luminous green skin and glowing green eyes	1959–1963	
Chesapeake Bay	Maryland Virginia Delaware	USA	North America	Chessie	Dark-colored snakelike body with flippers.		
Crescent Lake	Newfoundland and Labrador	Canada	North America	Cressie	Eel-Like Lake Monster	1950s–present	
Devil's Lake	Wisconsin	USA	North America	Devil's Lake Monster	Fresh Water Octopus		
Lake Tota	Boyacá	Colombia	South America	Diablo Ballena (Devil Whale), Monster of Lake Tota	A huge black fish, bigger than a whale, with the head of a bull.	1652–	
Lake Elsinore	California	USA	North America	Elsie, Hamlet, Lake Elsinore Monster	Cross between a plesiosaur and a sea serpent	1884–1994	
Flathead Lake	Montana	USA	North America	Flessie, Flossie, Flathead Lake Monster	Either a 20 to 40 feet (6.1 to 12.2 m) long eel-like creature; round, brown to blue-black in color and possesses steel-black eyes and undulating hips or a large-sized fish from 6 to 10 feet (1.8 to 3.0 m) in length.		
Lake Ontario	OntarioNew York	CanadaUSA	North America	Gaasyendietha	Dragon that dwells in rivers and lakes of Canada, especially Lake Ontario. This dragon flies on a trail of fire, and can also spew fire.		Seneca Legend
Lake Thunderbird Lake Oolagah Lake Tenkiller	Oklahoma	USA	North America	The Giant Freshwater Octopus	A 20-foot (6.1 m) long giant octopus, reddish-brown with leathery skin		Thought to be responsible for Oklahoma lake drownings
Gryttjen	Hälsingland	Sweden	Europe	Gryttie	Long, serpentine, and potentially horned.	1980s–	
Herrington Lake	Kentucky	USA	North America	Harry, Eel-Pig	Roughly 15 ft (4.6 m) long with a body like that of an eel and a skin tone/pattern reminiscent of a speckled fish. It is said to be as fast as a boat at times, and also possess a stubby pig-like snout and a somewhat curly tail.	1925-1972	
Hawkesbury River	New South Wales	Australia	Australia	Hawkesbury River Monster, Moolyewonk, Mirreeular	25 to 30-foot (7.6 to 9 m) grayish-black plesiosaur with a snake-like head.		
Lake Hodges	California	USA	North America	Hodgee	Plesiosaurs or Loch Ness Monster-like creature		
Devil's Lake	Wisconsin	USA	North America	Hokuwa	A long neck and small head, plesiosaur-like.		
Lake Simcoe	Ontario	Canada	North America	Igopogo, Kempenfelt Kelly	Seal-like animal. Length, 12–70 feet (3.7–21.3 m). Charcoal-gray color. Dog- or horse-like face. Prominent eyes. Gaping mouth. Neck is like a stovepipe. Several dorsal fins. Fishlike tail.		Also known as Kempenfelt Kelly.
Iliamna Lake	Alaska	USA	North America	Illie, Iliamna Lake Monsters	Monstrous fish with blunt heads used to smash through boat bottoms. Said to resemble a barracuda, silvery in color with black stripes.		First reported by the Aleut people
Lake Edward	North Kivu	Democratic Republic of the Congo, Uganda	Africa	Irizima	Gigantic hippopotamus with the horns of a rhinoceros upon its head, or a marsh monster with a hippo's legs, an elephant' trunk, a lizard's head, and an aardvark's tail.		
Bear Lake	Idaho Utah	USA	North America	Isabella, Bear Lake Monster	Head variously described as being similar to that of a cow, otter, crocodile, or a walrus (minus the tusks). Its size was reported to be at least fifty feet (15 m) long, and light cream in color.		The creature can supposedly crawl onto the shore.
Lake Ikeda	Kagoshima	Japan	Asia	Issie	A huge saurian creature with black humps.	1978	
Lake Ontario	OntarioNew York	CanadaUSA	North America	Kingstie	The descriptions over the years have been inconsistent, with color ranging from blue to brown, a large head or no head at all, bristled or bald, teeth like an alligator or toothless.		
Hudson River	New York	USA	North America	Kipsy, Hudson River Monster	Sea Serpent, shark, or manatee		
Lake Kussharo	Hokkaido	Japan	Asia	Kusshii	30 to 60 ft (9.1 to 18.3 m) long with humps on its back, a long neck and a pair of horns on its head.		
Lagarfljót		Iceland	Europe	Lagarfljót Worm	Sometimes said to resemble large islands, but at other times to rise out of the water in arches, spanning hundreds of fathoms. People were unsure what sort of monster this was because neither its head nor tail was visible from Skálholtsannáll.	1345-Present	
Lake Leelanau	Michigan	USA	North America	Lake Leelanau Monster	A log with eyes	1910	
Lake Tianchi	Jilin, Ryanggang	ChinaNorth Korea	Asia	Lake Tianchi Monster	A large turtle-like animal, or a long black creature, some 20–30 meters long with a small head shaped like that of a horse.		Lake Tianchi is also known as Lake Chonji, and is partly located in North Korea.
Lake Van	Van, Bitlis	Turkey	Asia	Lake Van Monster	Said to resemble ancient marine reptiles such as a plesiosaur.		
Lake Worth	Texas	USA	North America	Lake Worth Monster	Fishy man-goat, humanoid torso with goat legs, covered in white fur and scales	1969	
Lake Como	Lombardy	Italy	Europe	Lariosauro, Larry	Nothosaur	1949–1957	
Lake Victoria		KenyaUganda Tanzania	Africa	Lukwata	20–30 feet (6.1–9.1 m) long, with dark smooth skin and a rounded head		
Lake Manitoba, Lake Winnipegosis	Manitoba	Canada	North America	Manipogo, Winnipogo	A long muddy-brown body with humps that show above the water, and a sheep-like head.	1908–1962	Manipogo also known as the Winnipogo as the Lake Monster is reported to live in Lake Manitoba which is connected to Lake Winnipegosis, Canada. The creature was dubbed Manipogo in 1957, the name echoing British Columbia's Ogopogo.
Gudgerama Creek	Northern Territory	Australia	Australia	Mannie, Maningrida monster	60 feet (18 m) long, dark, scaly, and three-headed.	1972	
Lake Memphrémagog	Vermont Quebec	USA; Canada	North America	Memphré	Plesiosaurs or Loch Ness Monster-like creature		Lake Memphrémagog lies partly in the USA.
Lake Manitou	Indiana	USA	North America	Meshekenabek	Thirty feet (9 m) long, dark in color, possesses a long neck with a horse-like head.		
Missouri River	Missouri	USA	North America	Mi-ni-wa-tu	An amphibious creature with a body like that of a buffalo, covered with red hair. It has a single horn in its forehead, and a single eye. Its back is notched like a saw or gear.		From Lakota peoples' mythology
Lake Superior	Ontario	Canada	North America	Mishipeshu	Has the head and claws of a panther, but with scales and spines.		
Congo River Basin		Republic of the Congo	Africa	Mokele-mbembe	Apatosaurus-like creature		
Elizabeth Lake	California	USA	North America	The Monster of Elizabeth Lake	Bat wings, the neck of a giraffe, the head of a bulldog, six legs, a length of at least fifty feet (15 m), and emit a horrible nauseating stench.	1830–1886	
Loch Morar	Scotland	United Kingdom	Europe	Morag	20 ft (6.1 m) serpent-like creature.		
Lakes of Killarney	Munster	Ireland	Europe	Muckie	27 ft (8.2 m) snake-like creature	2003	
Loch Maree	Scotland	United Kingdom	Europe	Muc-sheilch	Physically identical to Nessie		
Lake Temiskaming	Ontario	Canada	North America	Mugwump	Approximately 20 ft (6.1 m) long, a black, glistening head with protruding eyeballs		
Lake Alexandrina	South Australia	Australia	Australia	Muldjewangk	Sometimes portrayed as evil merfolk (half man half fish), or times as a gargantuan monster. It is also inconsistent whether there are many of the creatures, or a single "The Muldjewangk".		
Muskrat Lake	Ontario	Canada	North America	Mussie	Variously described as a walrus, a sturgeon, or as a three-eyed Loch Ness Monster-like creature		
Lake Nahuel Huapi	Río Negro Province and Neuquén Province	Argentina	South America	Nahuelito	Plesiosaurs or Loch Ness Monster-like creature.	1910–2024	
Loch Ness	Scotland	United Kingdom	Europe	Nessie	Plesiosaurs-like		
Lake Norman	North Carolina	USA	North America	Normie, Lake Norman Monster	Long and serpentine with scaly fins and flippers, a dog-like head, and red eyes.	1967–	
Great Salt Lake	Utah	USA	North America	North Shore Monster, Great Brine Shrimp, Old Briney	Monster crocodilian or monstrous shrimp-like crustacean	1840–	
Bangweulu Swamp		Zambia	Africa	Nsanga	Crocodile-like animal with smooth skin and hooked claws.		
Lake Kariba		Zimbabwe	Africa	Nyami Nyami	Dragon-like creature with a snake's torso and the head of a fish.		Season 4 episode 3 of River Monsters reveals that Nyaminyami was inspired by the Vundu Catfish, southern Africa's largest fish.
East Okoboji Lake	Iowa	USA	North America	Obojoki	A large dark greenish-brown animal with a head the size of a bowling ball.	1903–2001	
Onondaga Lake	New York	USA	North America	Oggie	Giant salamander		
Okanagan Lake	British Columbia	Canada	North America	Ogopogo	Green in color, three humps in the water and a horse-like bearded head.	1926–2011	
Finger Lakes	New York	USA	North America	Old Greeny	Green Eel-like serpent		
Turtle Lake	Saskatchewan	Canada	North America	Turtle Lake Monster	Large ancient looking fish-like creature similar to a River Sturgeon; could in fact be trapped River Sturgeon. There might be up to three of them.	1923–Present	
Lake Utopia	New Brunswick	Canada	North America	Old Ned	Approximately 20 feet (6.1 m) in length, having a large head, being reddish-brown or dark red in color, Eel-like	1867–present	
Great Slave Lake	Northwest Territories	Canada	North America	Ol' Slavey			
Lake Pend Oreille	Idaho	USA	North America	Pend Oreille Paddler	Plesiosaurs or Loch Ness Monster-like creature	1940s–1996	
Lake Pepin	Minnesota	USA	North America	Pepie	Large Serpent Like Creature		
Bueng Khong Long, Mekong River	Bueng Kan; Nong Khai	Thailand	Asia	Phaya Naga	Serpent-like creature	Ancient times–present	Scientists and researchers at the Faculty of Science of Chulalongkorn University have attributed these seemingly preternatural phenomena to standing waves in water, and posit that the existence of Phaya Nak is similar to belief in Loch Ness Monster in Scotland or Ogopogo in Canada.
Pocomoonshine Lake	Maine	USA	North America	Poco	30–60-foot-long (9–18 m) snake		
Lake Pohenegamook	Quebec	Canada	North America	Ponik	Dark Serpentine body and a horse-like head with catfish-like whiskers	1874–present	
Lake Superior	Ontario	Canada	North America	Pressie	Dark serpentine body with a long neck, a whale-like tail, and whiskers.		
Seljordsvatnet	Telemark	Norway	Europe	Seljordsormen, Selma	30 to 45-foot (9 to 14 m) serpent-like creature, resembling a large anaconda; some reports even include several humps on its back.	1750- Present	
Tasik Chini	Pahang	Malaysia	Asia	Seri Gumum	Legendary dragon-like creature mentioned in old folklore, and other literary works		
Payette Lake	Idaho	USA	North America	Sharlie, Slimy Slim, The Twilight Dragon	Serpent		
Lake Powell	Arizona	USA	North America	Skin Fin	Possesses a large dorsal fin like that of a shark, a body built like an elephant, the flat wide tail of a manatee, and a head and neck like a miniature brontosaurus. Its skin is described as being a dark oily black and smooth like that of an eel.		
Lake De Smet	Wyoming	USA	North America	Smetty	Head like a horse, a bony ridge down its back, and about 40 feet (12 m) long.		
Storsjön	Jämtland	Sweden	Europe	Storsjöodjuret	Humped back and a long neck and tail. It has grayish-brown skin with a yellow underbelly, a dog-like head, and a body anywhere between 10 and 42 feet (3.0 and 12.8 m) in length.	1635–	
Lake Tahoe	CaliforniaNevada	USA	North America	Tahoe Tessie	Large, serpent-like creature.		
Rivers, Lakes, and Caves throughout New Zealand		New Zealand	Australia	Taniwha	Resembles a shark, dragon, or whale, or a shapeshifter that can appear like any of those animals.		Creatures from Māori folklore
Llyn Tegid	Wales	United Kingdom	Europe	Teggie			
Thetis Lake	British Columbia	Canada	North America	Thetis Lake Monster	Creature with "silvery scaled skin, sharp claws, and spikes on its head.	1972	
Lake Lepel	Vitebsk	Belarus	Europe	Tsmok	Behemoths with the head of a deer or snake and the body of a seal.		
Wallowa Lake	Oregon	USA	North America	Wally, Wallowa Lake Monster	A long, serpent-like creature, often compared in appearance to the Chinese Dragon, with multiple humps on its back which can be seen when the creature swims along the surface of the water, some accounts also include horns atop the beasts head.		Originated in Nez Pearce Legend
White River	Arkansas	USA	North America	Whitey, White River Monster	A gray fish-like creature with a horn sticking out from its forehead sometimes described as having a spiny back twenty feet (6.1 m) long.		This monster is said to have been responsible for overturning a Confederate munitions boat during the civil war.
Arenal Lagoon	Alajuela	Costa Rica	North America		Cow-headed, horned, and serpentine		
St. Johns River	Florida	United States	North America	St. Johns River Monster, Johnnie, Borinkus	Serpentine, with horns and a ridge on its back		
Sacramento River	California	United States	North America	Wetlash	Water elemental, that resembles an elf made completely of water		
Zegrze Reservoir	Masovian Voivodeship	Poland	Europe	Zegrze Reservoir Monster			

== Gallery ==
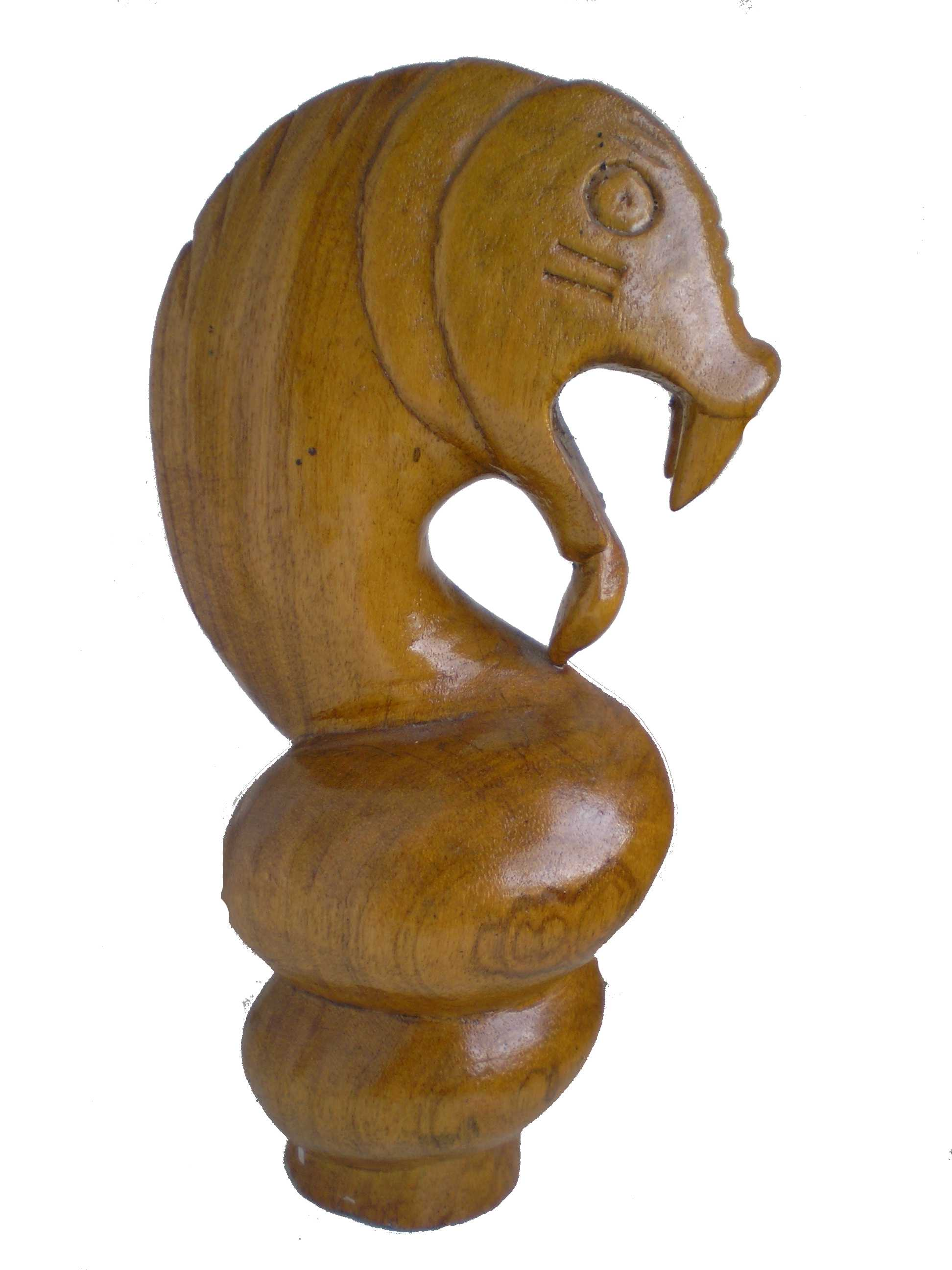
A wooden carving of Nyaminyami

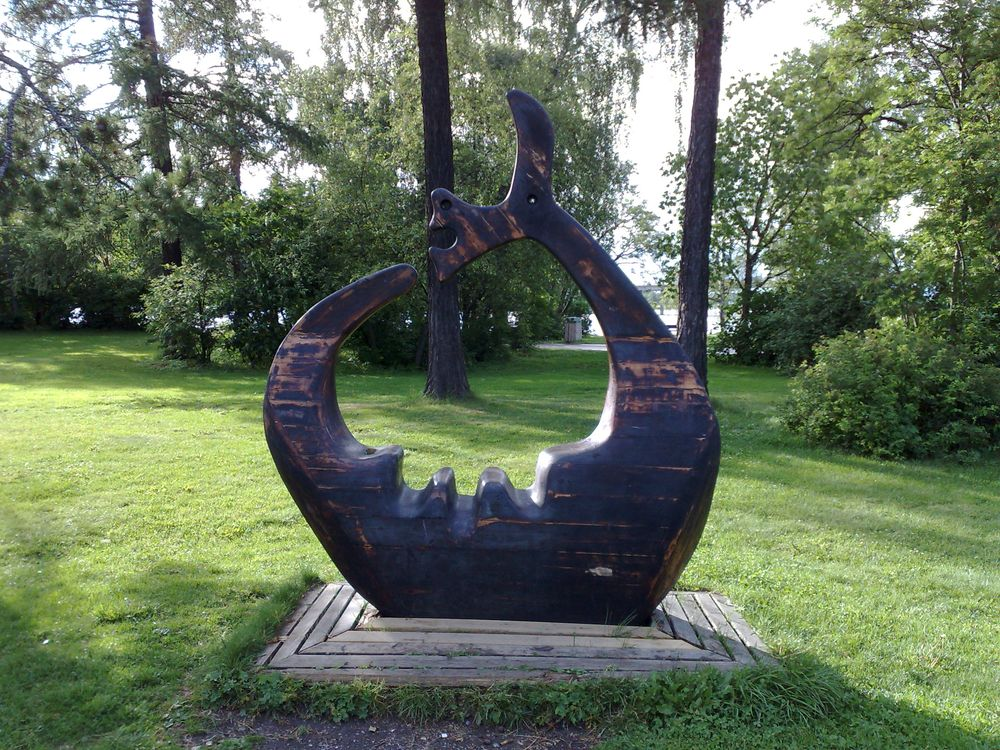
An artist's concept of Storsjöodjuret

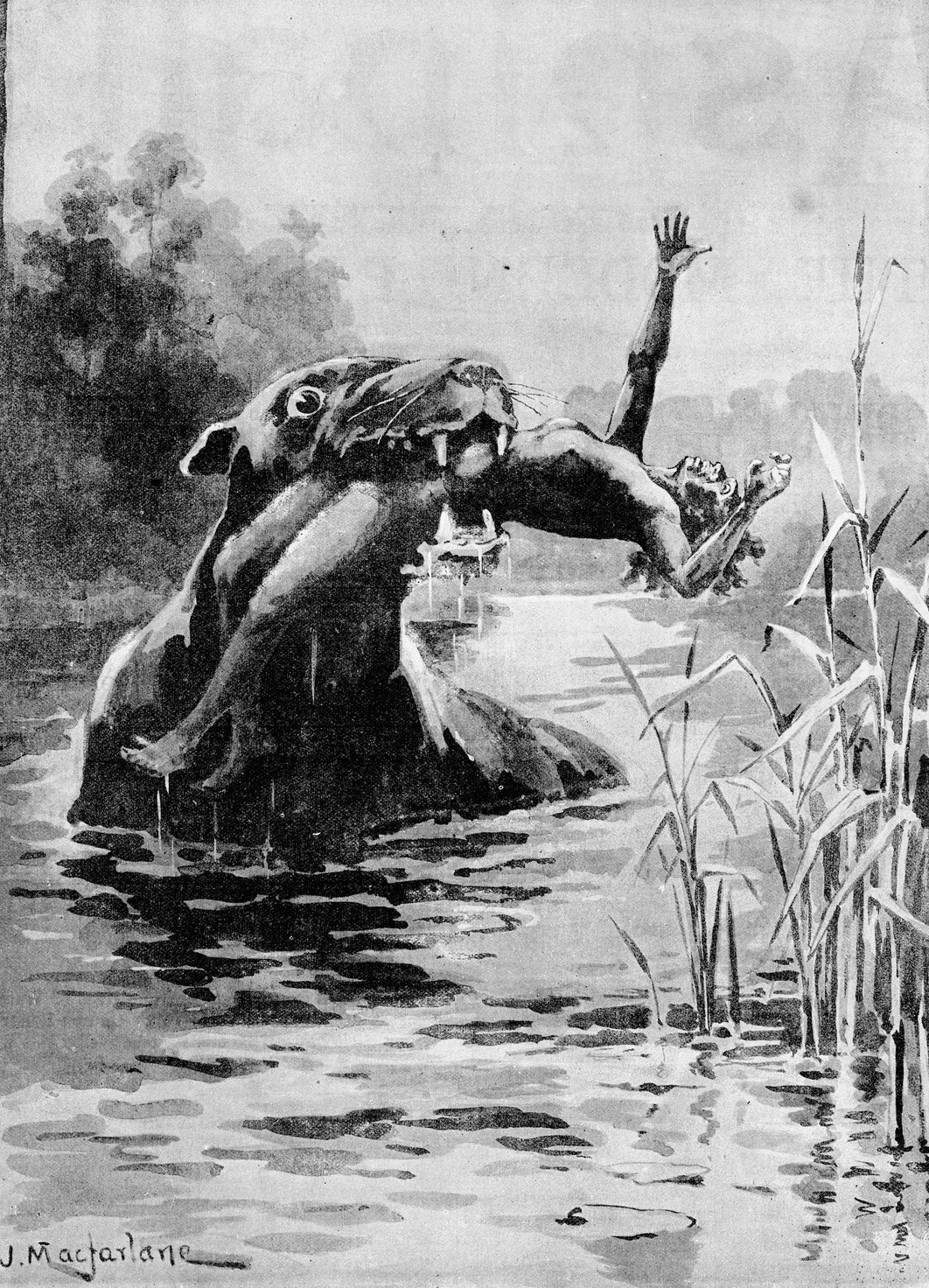
An artist's concept of a Bunyip, 1890

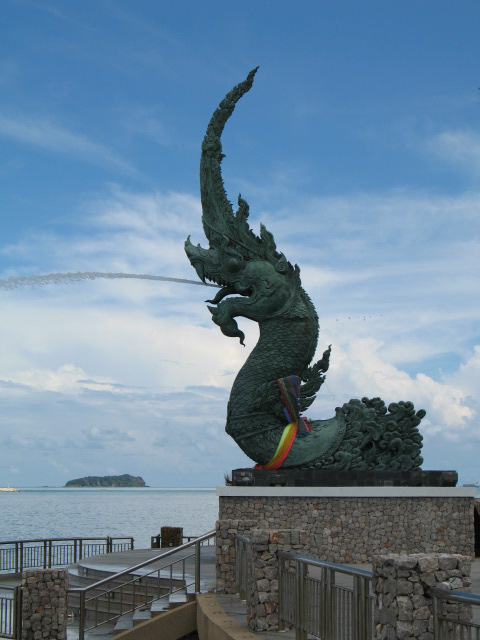
Head of Phaya Nak at Songkhla Lake, Thailand

== See also ==
- List of cryptids
- Underwater panther
- Sea monsters
