= List of Scottish loch-monsters =

List of Scottish loch-monsters is a list of lochs in Scotland said to contain monsters in Scottish folklore.

Loch	Monster's name/nickname	Description	Citation
Loch Achanalt	Monster		
Loch a'Mhuillidh	Beithir		
Loch Arkaig	Archie	Water or lake horse	
Loch Assynt	Monster		
Loch Awe	Beathach mór	serpent with a horse-like head and twelve scaly legs	
Loch Brittle	monster		
Cauldshiels Loch		water horse or water bull	
Loch Duich			
Loch Garve		Kelpie	
Loch Linnhe			
Loch Lochy	Lizzie	Said to resemble a plesiosaur and have three humps along its back	
Loch Lomond	Lomond monster	resembles a plesiosaur or large crocodile	
Loch Maree	Muc-sheilch		
Loch Morar	Mòrag		
Loch Ness	Nessie/Niseag		
Loch Oich	Wee Oichy	Beast has a "shaggy "dog-like" head	
Loch Quoich		Water horse or kelpie	
Loch Shiel	Seileag	three humps and 70 ft long	
Loch Suainaval (Lewis)	Searrach Uisge	Water Colt	

== See also ==
- List of lake monsters
