= List of swamp monsters =

Fictional or mythological creatures said to lurk in swamps

A swamp monster (also variously called a swamp creature, swamp man, or muck monster) is a fictional or mythological creature imagined to lurk in a swamp. Some swamp monsters resemble aquatic creatures, others aquatic plants and moss. They are generally depicted as fierce and destructive.

== Examples in folklore, legends, and mythology ==
- The Will-o'-the-wisp appears in swamps, and in some areas there are legends of it being an evil spirit.
- The Bunyip is a creature from Aboriginal mythology that lurks in swamps, billabongs, creeks, riverbeds, and waterholes.
- The Grootslang is a huge elephant-like creature with a serpent's tail which according to legend lives in caves, swamps, freshwater in South Africa.
- The Lernaean Hydra in Greek and Roman mythology was the creature Heracles killed in the swamp near Lake Lerna.
- The Honey Island Swamp Monster is known in Louisiana.
- The skunk ape is a horrible-smelling large ape creature said to live in swamps in the Southeastern United States.
- The Lizard Man of Scape Ore Swamp was the subject of a hoax in South Carolina in the late 1980s.
- The Prime Hook Swamp Creature is a dog-like animal that has been spotted in the Prime Hook National Wildlife Refuge in Delaware.

== Examples in comics ==
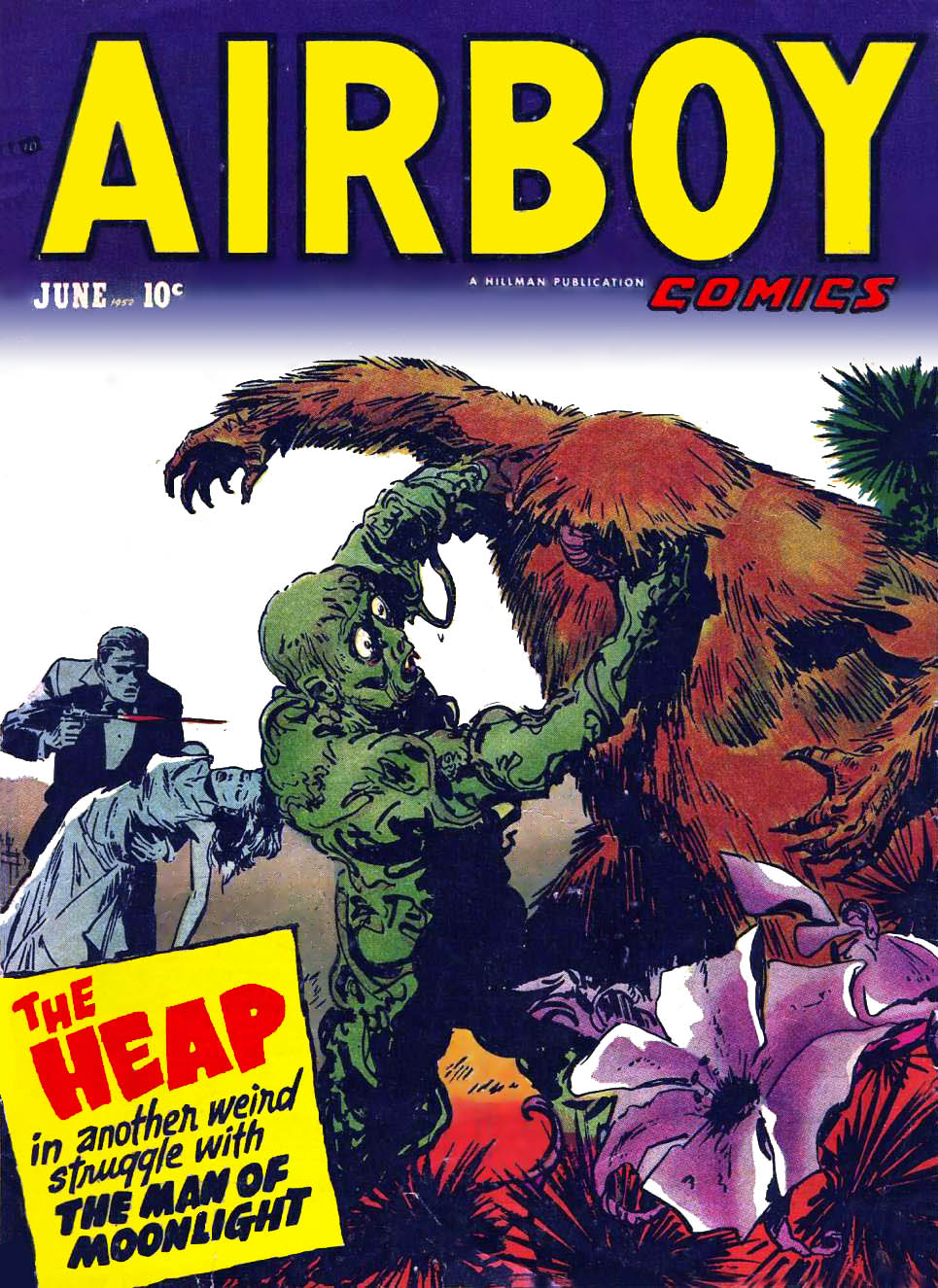
The Heap in mortal combat with the "Man of the Moonlight" on the cover of Airboy Comics, vol. 9 #5 (June 1952). Artwork by Ernest Schroeder.

From the 1940s to the present many swamp monsters have been used in comics, an early example being Hillman Publications' the Heap.

Afterwards, both DC Comics and Marvel created similar characters:

- DC has the Swamp Thing, created by Len Wein and Berni Wrightson.
- Marvel has the Man-Thing, created by Stan Lee, Gray Morrow, Roy Thomas, and Gerry Conway.

The debuts of the two characters were so close that it is impossible to say which came first. Alan Moore, who worked on Swamp Thing for a period, later described the character's original incarnation as "a regurgitation of Hillman Comics' The Heap", adding that "When I took over that character at Len Wein's suggestion, I did my best to make it an original character that didn't owe a huge debt to previously existing swamp monsters."

Other swamp monsters in comics include:

- Solomon Grundy, a swamp zombie created by Alfred Bester and Paul Reinman for DC Comics
- The Glob, created by Roy Thomas and Herb Trimpe for Marvel Comics
- Swamp Beast from Monster in My Pocket by Dwayne McDuffie and Gil Kane for Harvey Comics.
- Bog Swamp Demon, a fictional character appearing in Teenage Mutant Ninja Turtles comic books.
- Danny Dunn and the Swamp Monster by Raymond Abrashkin and Jay Williams.
- In the anime and manga One Piece, the Straw Hat Pirates are attacked by Caribou who has eaten the Swamp Swamp Fruit (a Logia-type Devil Fruit that lets its consumer generate, control, and turn into a "swamp").

== Examples in other media ==
- The title creature in Theodore Sturgeon's 1940 short story "It!" is the earliest example of a plant-based swamp monster.
- The Gill-man from the 1954 film Creature from the Black Lagoon appears as a fish-like humanoid.
  - A creature, credited as the Gill-man, also appears in the non-Universal release The Monster Squad (1987) along with Count Dracula, Frankenstein's Monster, the mummy and the Wolf Man. He was performed by Tom Woodruff, Jr.
- An episode of Kolchak: The Night Stalker entitled "The Spanish Moss Murders" (December 6, 1974) features a young man, subject of a study in sleep research, whose nightmares of a Spanish moss-covered swamp-dwelling monster called Pèremalfait from stories heard in his youth in the Louisiana Bayou come to life. (The creature in this case was played by Richard Kiel.)
- Tsuburaya Productions' Ultra Series franchise features a recurring amphibious monster named Ragon, who first appeared in the 1966 television series Ultra Q. In the series, Ragon is an ancient species with attributes of both primates and fish, and is said to have intelligence equal to or greater than a gorilla.
- The DC Comics character "Swamp Thing" mentioned above was the subject of a 1982 film and a 1990 live-action television series.
- The 1996 Goosebumps book "How to Kill a Monster" featured a Swamp Monster. It was depicted as a green-furred monster with the head of a crocodilian and an ape-like body, in addition to having clawed forelegs.
  - The Swamp Monster makes an appearance in the franchise's film adaptation performed by Nate Andrade (being credited as "Monster #1"). It serves as a minor antagonist during the film's climax and is referred to as the "Bog Monster" during the 2014 Comic Con appearance. Its appearance is different from the source material, being depicted as a large creature made of moss.
- The TV series Family Guy featured some swamp monsters. In the episode "I Never Met the Dead Man" (April 11, 1999), the Griffin family catches a creature strongly resembling a "Swamp Monster" while fishing. In the episode "Business Guy" (December 13, 2009), Carter Pewterschmidt and Lois Griffin trick Peter Griffin into surrendering Pewterschmidt Industries by scaring him into believing a local swamp monster will eat him if he does not. A seemingly real swamp monster scares Peter out of the office and then chases Lois and a disguised Carter before being trapped and unmasked to be Gregory House.
- David Winning's 2008 film Swamp Devil stars Bruce Dern as a retired sheriff trying to prove the existence of a swamp monster.
- In Animal Planet's Lost Tapes, the episode "Swamp Creature" (January 26, 2009) is about the Louisiana Swamp Monster, which is said to be an abandoned Native American child who was raised by alligators.
- While criticizing a movie featuring a swamp monster, one of the hosts of the 2010 series This Movie Sucks! (Ron Sparks) tells the legend of Lake Erie Pete about a man who becomes a crime-fighting swamp monster after his parents are killed by one.
- In the video game Infamous 2, the Swamp Monsters are the least mutated type of the Corrupted that have scythes instead of forearms and are the more common of the Corrupted.
- In season two of Scream Queens, the Green Meanie is described to be a swamp monster that lives in a toxic swamp near the C.U.R.E. Institute Hospital.
- In Minecraft, there is a skeleton variant called the bogged (a reanimated bog body) that shoots poisonous arrows and exclusively lives in swamps and mangrove forests.
- In the Shrek franchise, the protagonist Shrek is a giant ogre with green skin who lives in a swamp.

== See also ==
- Lists of legendary creatures
- List of reported lake monsters
- List of Scottish loch-monsters
