= Muckie =

Mythical creature in Irish folklore

In Irish folklore, Muckie is the name given to an alleged mysterious creature said to inhabit the Lakes of Killarney in Ireland.

In 2003, scientists conducted a series of sonar scans to determine local fish populations. However, a large solid object in the water was recorded, which has led to the theory that the lake is inhabited by some form of lake monster, similar to the famed "Nessie" of Loch Ness.

It has been suggested that witnesses might have seen seals which, when travelling in pairs, will dive and rise opposite to each other, giving the impression of being a single larger animal.

The name Muckie comes from a portmanteau of Muckross (one of the three Killarney lakes) and the -ie suffix to mimic "Nessie" of Loch Ness.

Tourism interests have tried to encourage the legend.

In October 2004, a Japanese TV crew spent a week in the region looking for Muckie.
