= Tim Dinsdale =

Welsh cryptozoologist and writer

- Born: 27 September 1924; Aberystwyth, Wales
- Died: 14 December 1987 (aged 63); Reading, Berkshire, England
- Occupations: Cryptozoologist, writer

Timothy Kay Dinsdale (27 September 1924 – 14 December 1987) was a British cryptozoologist who attempted to prove the existence of the Loch Ness Monster.

== Life ==
Dinsdale was born in Aberystwyth, Wales, the son of Felix and Dorys (Smith) Dinsdale, who were on a year's leave from China where his father was a shipping agent. Along with his parents, his older sister, Felicity, and later a younger brother, Peter, he lived in Hong Kong, Antung, and Shanghai, going to the China Inland Missionary School in Chefoo some 500 miles away from his home.

This necessitated a journey along the coast and in 1935 the ship, SS Tungchow, containing 70 British and American schoolchildren, was seized by pirates. Eventually Dinsdale and the other children were rescued by HMS Hermes (95) a British Aircraft carrier. The 10-year-old Dinsdale wrote an account of the adventure which received second prize in a competition run by a local newspaper, his first success as a writer.

In 1936 he and his brother returned to Britain to attend King's School, Worcester as boarders, and his sister was at a girls' school. In 1942-3 he attended the de Havilland Aeronautical Technical School, and also volunteered in the Home Guard, where during training he sustained a bullet wound to the hand, the object not being removed for 28 years. He joined the Royal Air Force becoming a pilot, and was training in Rhodesia and South Africa when the war ended so returned to complete his aeronautical training, and joining the aircraft industry.

In 1951 he married Wendy Osborne. They went on to have four children: Simon, Alexandra, Dawn, Angus. They moved to Toronto where he became an aeronautical engineer for Avro Aircraft Ltd, moving to Rolls-Royce aircraft division in Montreal in 1952, and back to Reading in the UK in 1956. He was mainly involved on the flight testing of jet engines. He was an Associate member of the Royal Aeronautical Society.

Being made redundant from the aircraft industry in 1962 he took a job as a self-employed insurance salesman, which allowed him to spend more time on a passion he had developed for proving the existence of the Loch Ness Monster, and which was to take over his life. He later got income from lecturing and the sale of books.

On 14 December 1987 he died of a heart attack at his home in Reading, and was cremated on 21 December. He was survived by his wife and four children.

== Loch Ness Monster ==
=== The 1960 film ===
An article "The Day I saw the Loch Ness Monster" in Everybody's magazine (21 Feb 1959) caught his attention, and he began reading more about the topic. In April 1960 he made a lone expedition to the Loch, with six days of watching. On the fourth day (21 April) and sixth day (23 April) he took cine film of a moving object on the surface. Along with his binocular observations, he was convinced that the film of 23 April was authentic proof of the existence of the monster, so next day he got a dinghy to take a similar track which he recorded on the remaining part of the film for comparison. Having shown the film to various people, he was approached by a newspaper reporter, and on 13 June the incident was reported in the Daily Mail with images and the film was shown on the BBC Panorama TV programme. Following this, he was commissioned to write a book Loch Ness Monster which was published in 1961.

The story and subsequent comments spread through the media. According to one author

The sensational result of Dinsdale's Expedition was to inspire an extraordinary revival of the mystery and trigger two decades of intensive surveillance of the loch's baffling surface.

One consequence was the formation of the Loch Ness Phenomena Investigation Bureau (LNPIB) in 1962 by MP David James with naturalist Sir Peter Scott, which mounted volunteer groups each summer until 1972. Dinsdale twice acted as Group Commander for two weeks.

In 1966 the film received publicity again, having been analysed by the Joint Air Reconnaissance Intelligence Centre (JARIC) which included the statement that the object was 'probably animate'.

However, additional analyses of the Dinsdale film have cast doubt on its validity, suggesting it was a case of mistaken identity and that the film shows a boat under poor lighting conditions.

- JARIC's estimates of the size and speed of the object are now believed to be overestimates due to miscalculations of the angle of the camera and cuts in the film.
- Analyses overlaying multiple frames seems to show a pale blob towards the rear end of the object, which appears in multiple frames and matches with the position of the helmsman of a boat at the stern by an engine, similar to that of the boat used by Dinsdale for comparison. Although Dinsdale attempted to rule this out by organizing for a small boat to sail a similar route later that morning, this comparison was filmed under different lighting conditions with a white boat unlike the mahogany red colour he had described the object to be.
- It has also been noted that the object in film does not actually submerge as often perceived but blends into the greyer reflections of the water in the monochromatic film.
- Although Dinsdale asserted he viewed the object clearly with binoculars, they actually had a wider field of view than his telephoto lens.
- A computer enhancement of the film done for 1993 Discovery Channel documentary Loch Ness Discovered claimed to shadow or a body of a large animal behind the hump underwater, but such a shadow would not be visible in the conditions and is likely reflections of the shore behind the object.

Although most researchers do not believe Dinsdale to be a hoaxer, his susceptibility to confirmation bias and trusting dubious sources as evidence of the monster's existence has been criticized.

=== Later search efforts ===
In 1967 he received a grant from Kodak for photographic equipment to help in his search.

He had other sightings including what he described as a head and neck:

My first sighting in 1970 was 10ft. of neck sticking up out of the water. At a range of half a mile, it was as thick as a telegraph post. I saw it next in 1971. I saw a 4ft.-high neck, very clearly, at about 250 yards.

— Tim Dinsdale speaking to a reporter 1975

Despite as many visits to the Loch as he could afford, he failed to obtain any more film footage.

In July 1987 at a two-day symposium in the Royal Scottish Museum's Natural History Department he was made an Honorary Member of the International Society of Cryptozoology (ISC) for

your many years of tireless efforts and fieldwork concerning the Loch Ness Monster. Regardless of whether such an animal exists or not, your dedication to the investigation and the honesty and integrity with which you have proceeded, is unparalleled in the field.

— ISC Director Richard Greenwell

In April 2020, the binoculars which Dinsdale used during his expedition featured in an episode of the BBC series The Repair Shop.

== Publications ==
- 1961 Tim Dinsdale Loch Ness Monster (Routledge & Kegan Paul) (UK); 1962 (Chilton) (USA)
- 1966 Tim Dinsdale The Leviathans (Routledge & Kegan Paul)
- 1972 Tim Dinsdale Loch Ness Monster, 2nd ed (Routledge & Kegan Paul)
- 1973 Tim Dinsdale The Story of the Loch Ness Monster (Target) ISBN 0-426-10591-5
- 1975 Tim Dinsdale Project Water Horse: The True Story of the Monster Quest at Loch Ness (Routledge & Kegan Paul) ISBN 0-7100-8030-1
- 1976 Tim Dinsdale The Leviathans (revised edition) (Futura) ISBN 0-86007-365-3
- 1977 Tim Dinsdale The Facts About Loch Ness and the Monster (Johnston & Bacon)

== See also ==
- Peter C. Byrne

== Bibliography ==
- Dinsdale, Angus (2013). The Man who Filmed Nessie: Tim Dinsdale and the enigma of the Loch Ness Monster. Hancock House. ISBN 978-0-88839-726-3. Pages are location in Kindle version.
- Dinsdale, Tim (1961). Loch Ness Monster. Routledge & Kegan Paul. SBN 7100-1279-9.1968 reprint by the Loch Ness Phenomena Investigation Bureau plus postscript by the author, of the 1961 book
- Binns, Ronald (1983). The Loch Ness Mystery Solved. Open Books. ISBN 0-7291-0139-8.
