= Heaven Lake =

Crater lake on the border between China and North Korea

Heaven Lake 天池 천지
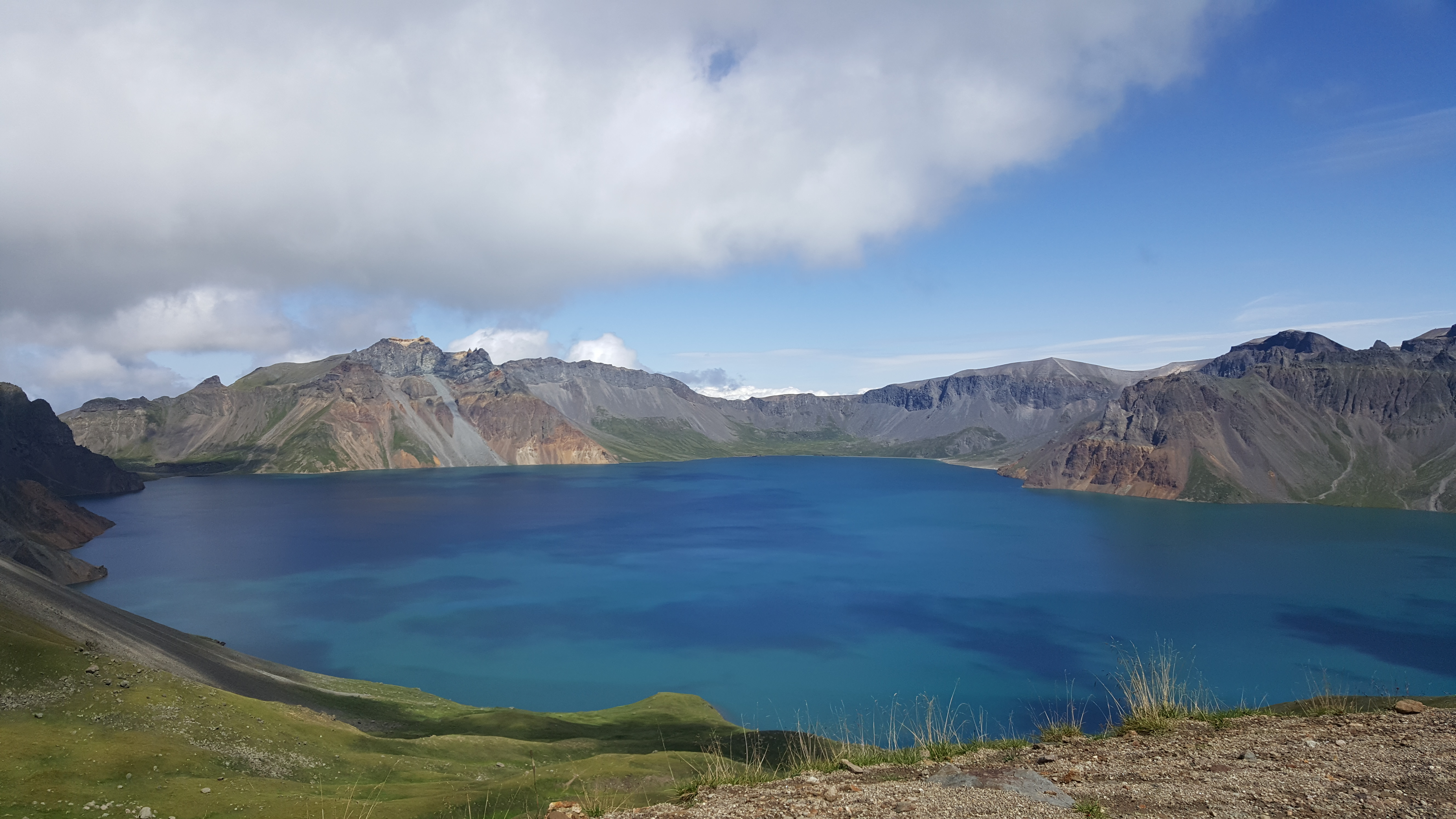
- Heaven Lake in summer

- Location within North Korea
- Location: China and North Korea
- Coordinates: 42.006°N 128.057°E
- Type: Crater lake
- Primary inflows: Precipitation
- Primary outflows: Erdaobai River
- Basin countries: China and North Korea
- Surface area: 9.82 km^{2} (3.79 sq mi)
- Average depth: 213 m (699 ft)
- Max. depth: 384 m (1,260 ft)
- Water volume: 2.09 km^{3} (0.50 cu mi)
- Surface elevation: 2,189.1 m (7,182 ft)

Heaven Lake

Chinese name
- Chinese: 天池
Transcriptions
Standard Mandarin
- Hanyu Pinyin: Tiānchí
- Wade–Giles: T'ien^{1} -ch'ih^{2}

Korean name
- Hangul: 천지
- Hanja: 天池
Transcriptions
- Revised Romanization: Cheonji
- McCune–Reischauer: Ch'ŏnji

Manchu name
- Manchu script: ᡨᠠᠮᡠᠨ ᠣᠮᠣ
- Romanization: Tamun omo

Manchu name
- Manchu script: ᡨᠠᠮᡠᠨ ᠵᡠᠴᡝ
- Romanization: Tamun juce

Heaven Lake (Chinese: 天池; pinyin: Tiān Chí; Korean: 천지) is a volcanic crater lake atop Paektu Mountain. It lies on the border between China and North Korea, and is roughly evenly divided between the two countries.

The Chinese part is in Jilin Province while the North Korean part is in Ryanggang Province.

== Geology and limnology ==
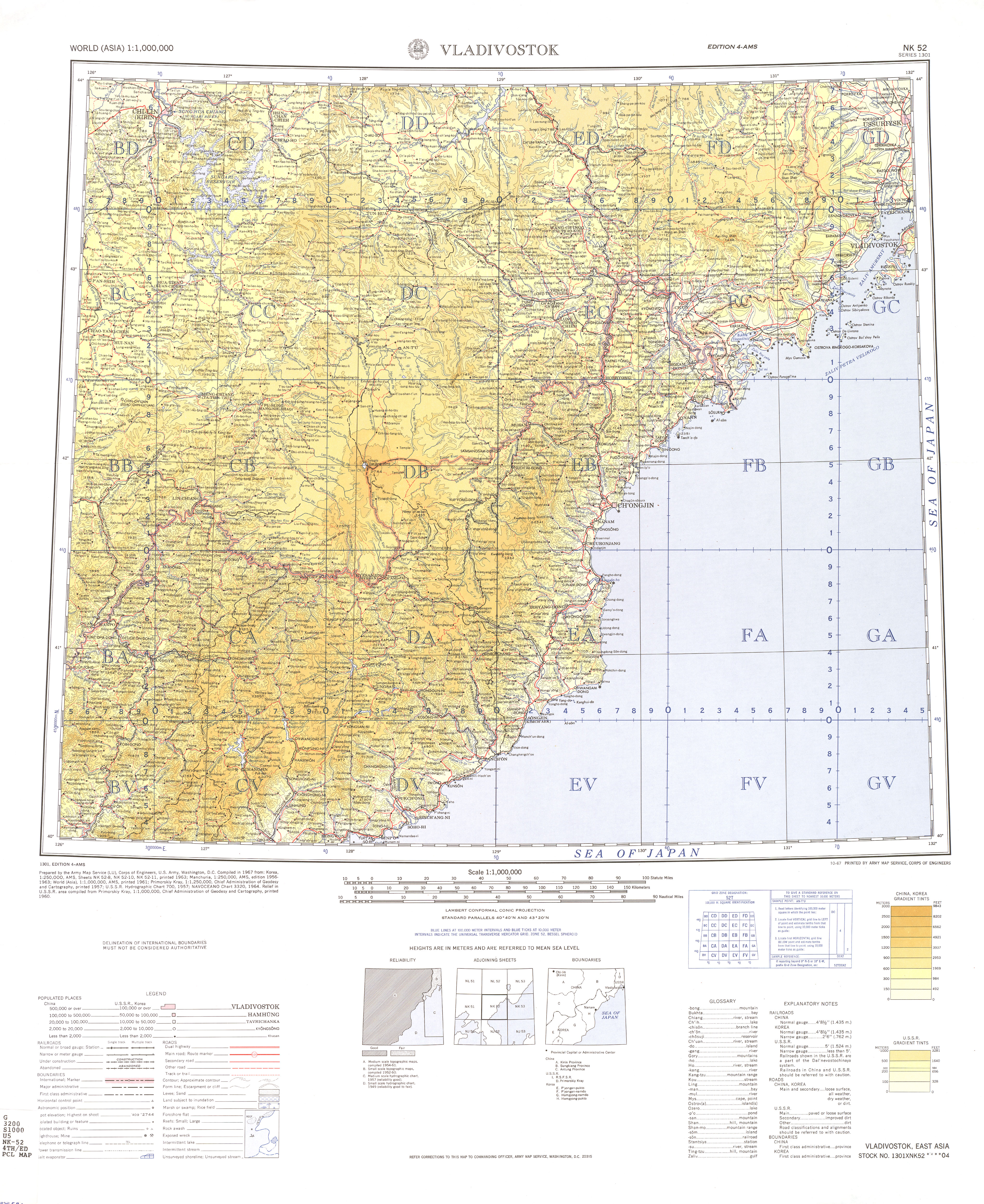
Map including Heaven Lake (labeled as T'ien Ch'ih) and surrounding region (1967) (Note: (from map: "DELINEATION OF INTERNATIONAL BOUNDARIES MUST NOT BE CONSIDERED AUTHORITATIVE"))

The caldera which contains Heaven Lake was created by the 946 eruption of Paektu Mountain.

The lake has a surface elevation of 2,189.1 m (7,182 ft). The lake covers an area of 9.82 km^{2} (3.79 sq mi), with a south–north length of 4.85 km (3.01 mi) and an east–west length of 3.35 km (2.08 mi). The average depth of the lake is 213 m (699 ft) and a maximum depth of 384 m (1,260 ft). From mid-October to mid-June, it is typically covered with ice.

== History ==
=== Names and legends ===
In ancient Chinese literature, Tianchi also refers to Nanming (南冥 sometimes translated as "southern sea").

North Korean propaganda claims that Kim Jong Il was born near the lake on the mountain. In accordance with this, North Korean state news agencies reported that on his death, the ice on the lake cracked "so loud, it seemed to shake the heavens and the Earth".

=== Lake Tianchi Monster ===
Heaven Lake is also alleged to be home to the Lake Tianchi Monster.

On September 6, 2007, Zhuo Yongsheng (director of a TV station's news center run by the administration office of the nature reserve at Mount Changbaishan, Jilin) shot a 20-minute video of six seal-like, finned Lake Tianchi Monsters, near the North Korean border. He sent pictures of the Loch Ness Monster-type creatures to Xinhua's Jilin provincial bureau. One of them showed the creatures swimming in three pairs, in parallel. Another showed them together, leaving ripples on the volcanic lake.

=== Notable visits ===
On September 20, 2018, as part of an Inter-Korean summit, heads of state Kim Jong-un and Moon Jae-in visited Mount Paektu and Heaven Lake. Moon filled a bottle with water from the lake to take back to South Korea. The visit to the lake was a symbolic gesture, as both the lake and the mountain hold considerable cultural significance to the Korean people. Mount Paektu is mentioned in the anthems of both North and South Korea, and is considered to be the spiritual home of the Koreans.

== In popular culture ==
The lake is the subject of the song 'Tianchi Lake' on The Mountain Goats' 2008 album Heretic Pride.

In the 2023 romantic film The Breaking Ice, the three protagonists hike together to see Heaven Lake.

== Gallery ==
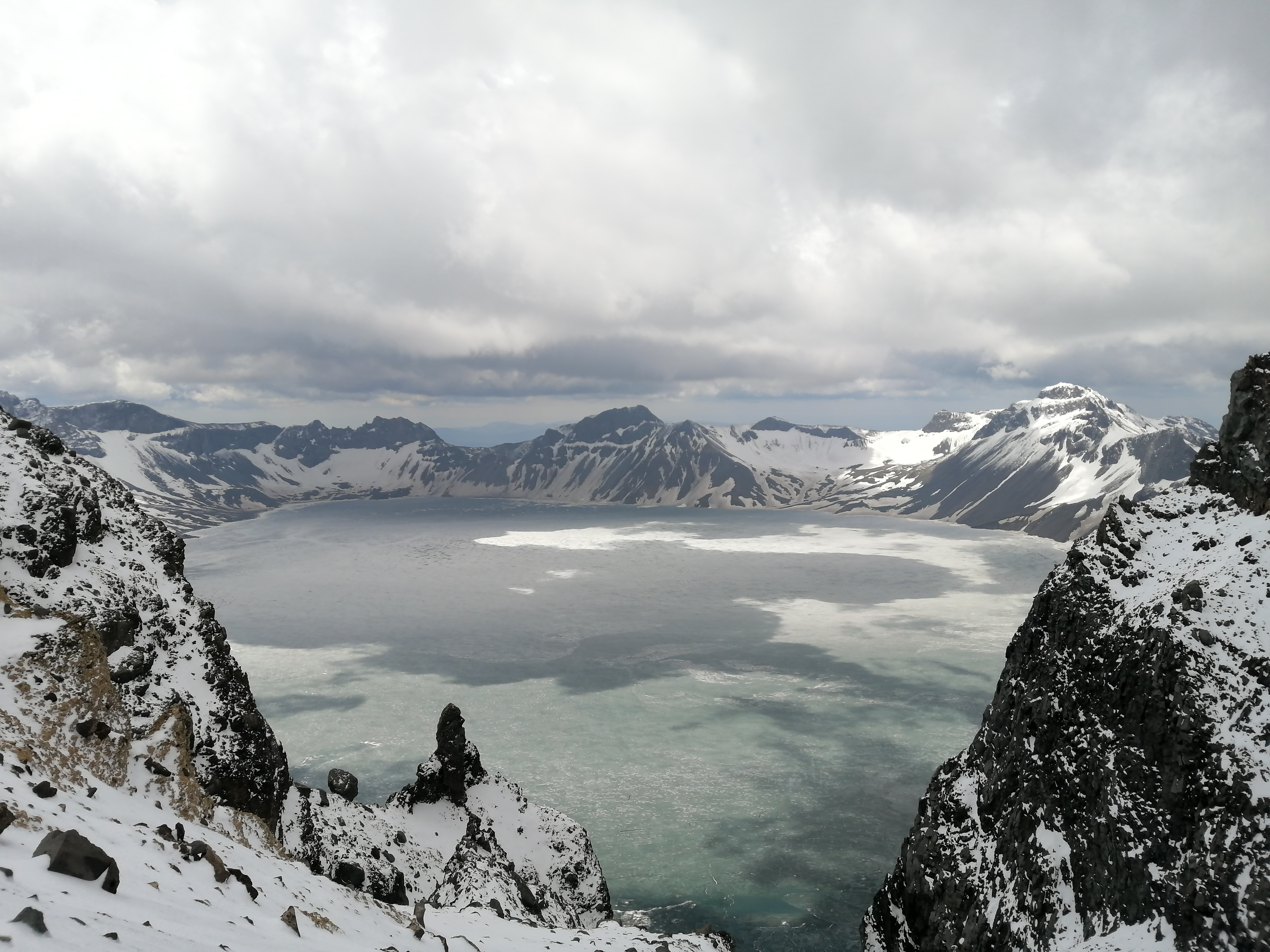
Heaven Lake in June

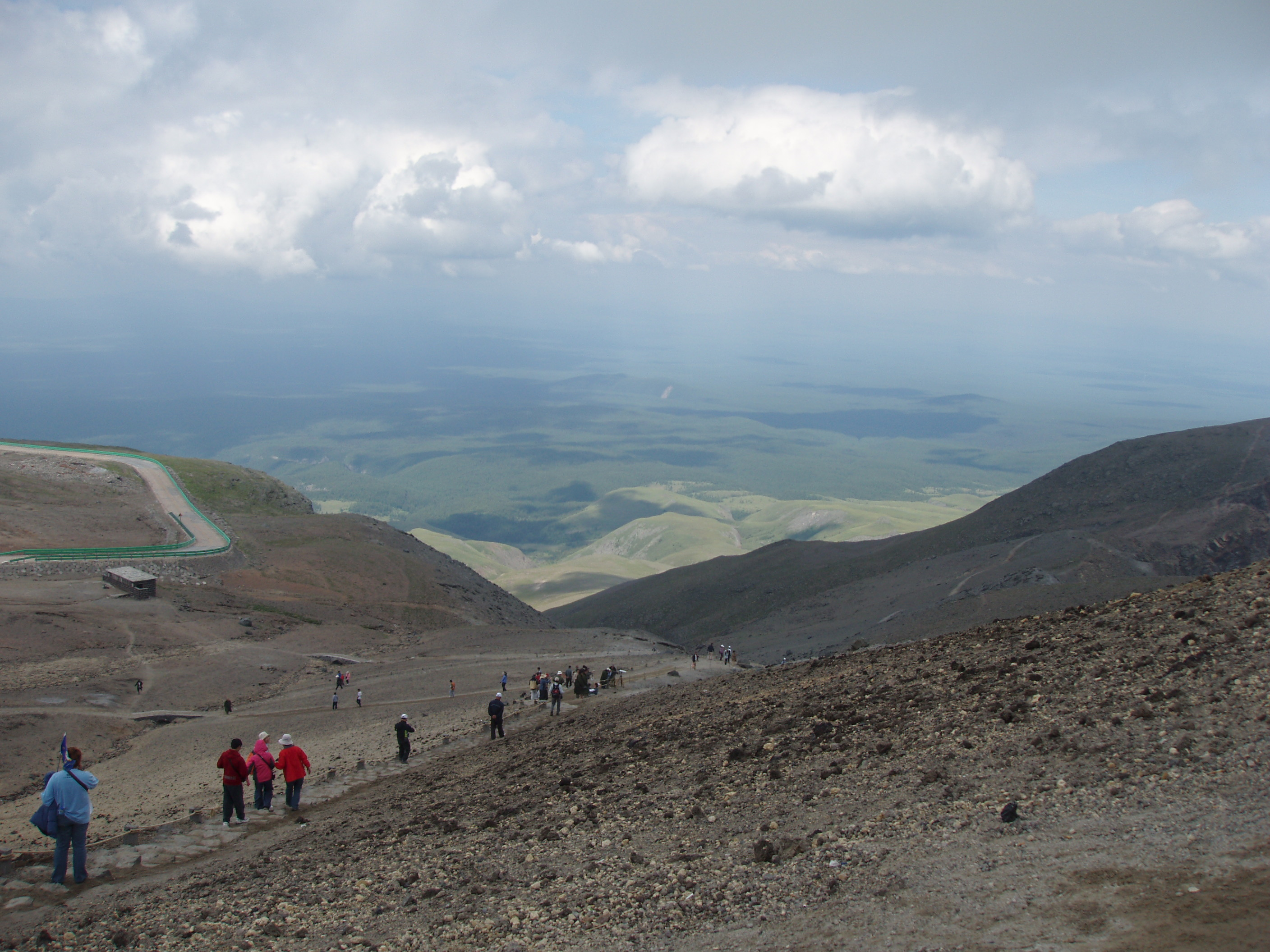
Slope of the mountain

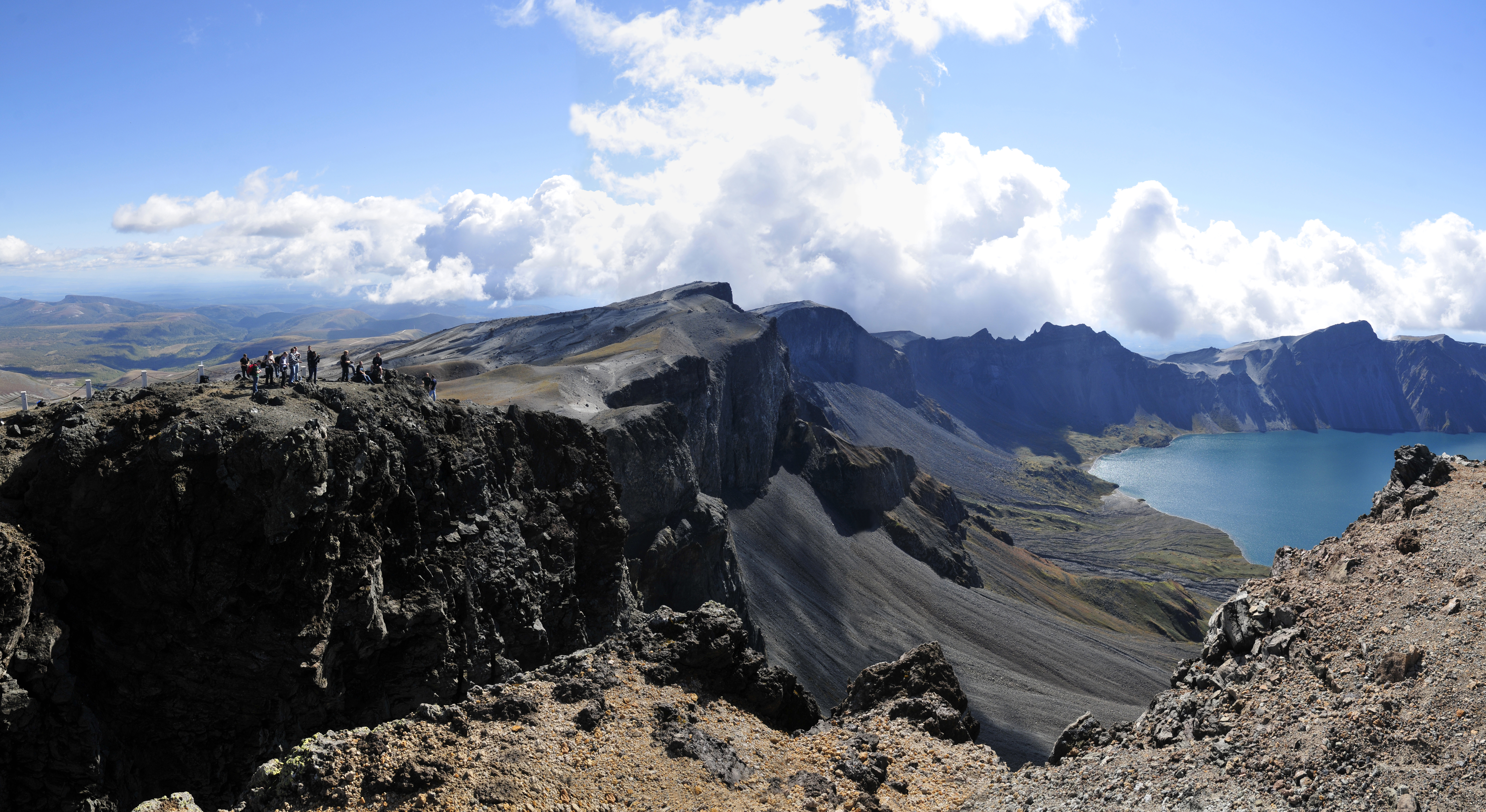
Cliff near the lake

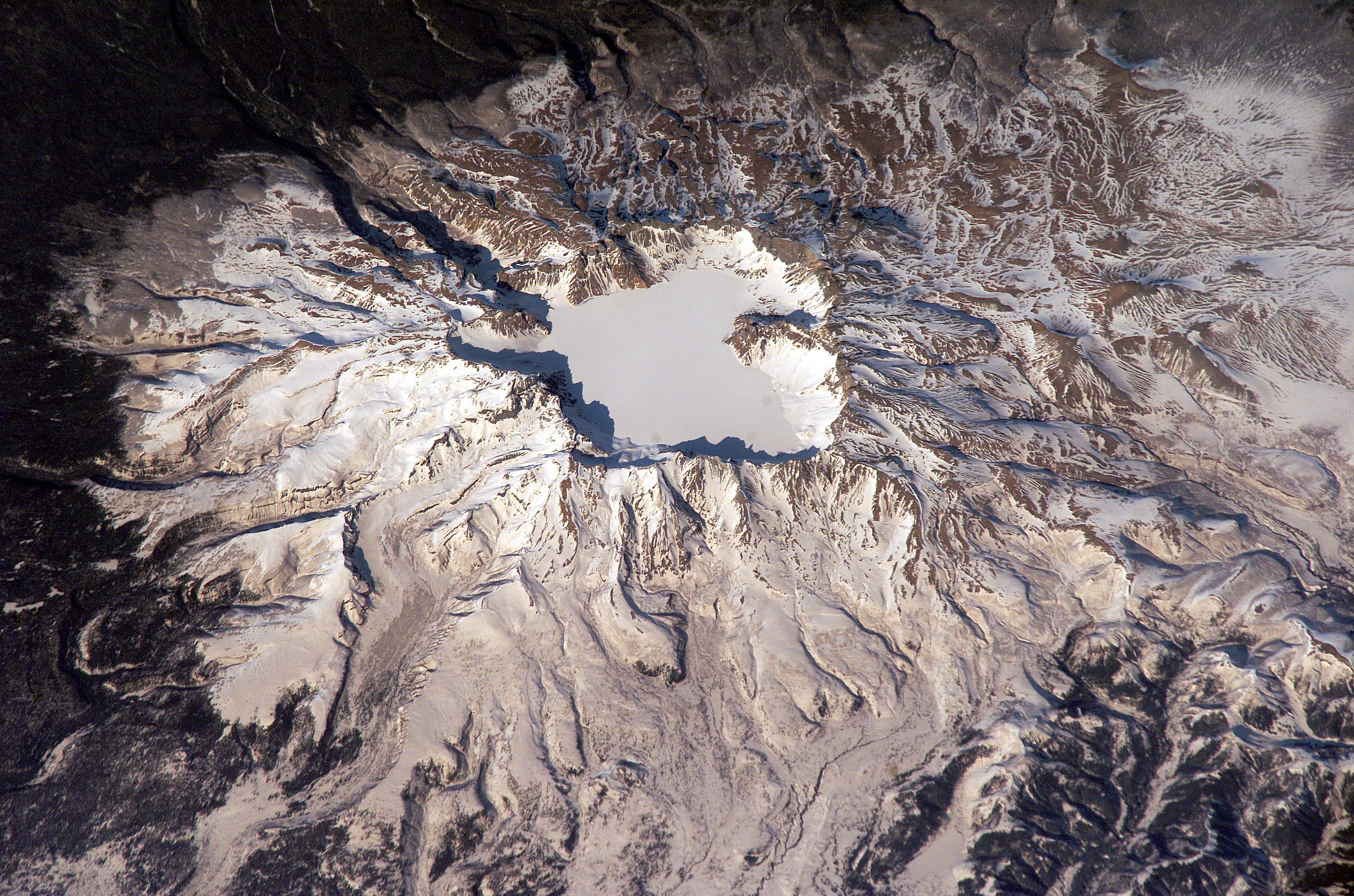
Aerial photograph

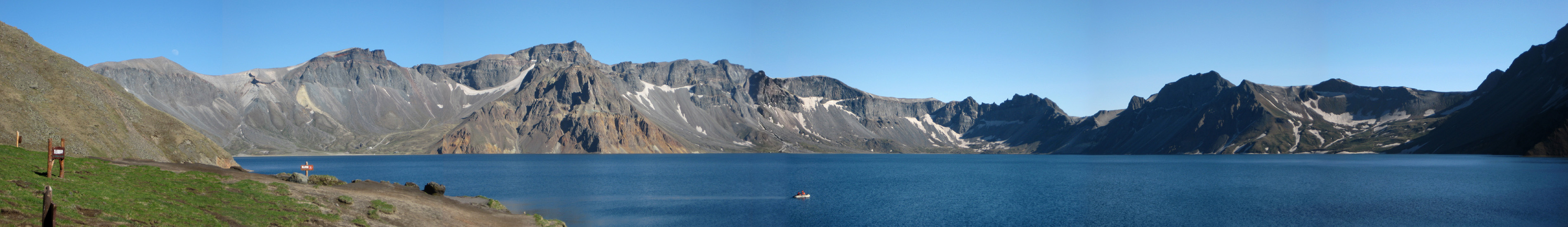
Overhead panorama of Heaven Lake

== See also ==
- Baekdu-daegan
- Korean Peninsula
- List of lakes of China
- List of lakes of Korea
- Tourism in China
- Tourism in North Korea
