= Zegrze Reservoir Monster =

Urban legend

Zegrze Reservoir Monster (Note: Polish: Paskuda z Zalewu Zegrzyńskiego) is a fictional lake monster, that according to an urban legend, lives in the Zegrze Reservoir near the city of Warsaw, Poland. The story was invented by a journalist Wojciech Mazurkiewicz, as a local equivalent to the legend of Loch Ness Monster, and was for the first time mentioned in media in the 1980s.

== History ==
The creature was invented by a journalist Wojciech Mazurkiewicz, as a local equivalent to the legend of Loch Ness Monster. It was for the first time mentioned in media, in the 1980s, in the Lato z radiem radio audition of Polskie Radio Program I. The sightings of the monster have been reported for several years since the audition. Some media had published the interviews with people who allegedly saw the creature, and posted the pictures meant to visualize the possible look of the monster. Eventually, it was revealed that the story of the monster has been fabricated by the journalist.

Dirty water present in the lake led many to believe that the monster had consumed sewage. The topic of the monster lost popularity after the sewage treatment plant has been built nearby, leading to the improvement of the water quality.

In 2007, the municipilaty of Nieporęt in Masovian Voivodeship, together with Twój Dobry Humor satirical magazine, had organised the contest for the best satirical drawing of the monster.
