= Walgren Lake Monster =

Cryptid reported in a lake in Nebraska, US

Creature information
- Other names: Alkali Lake Monster; Giganticus Brutervious
- Grouping: Cryptids
- Sub grouping: Lake monster
- Similar entities: American Alligator; Common Mudpuppy; Channel Catfish
- Folklore: Consumes livestock in large numbers, causes earthquakes, and disorients travelers

Origin
- Country: United States
- Region: Sandhills of Nebraska
- Habitat: Alkaline lakes

The Walgren Lake Monster (also known as the Alkali Lake Monster and Giganticus Brutervious) is a cryptid of varying description reported in Walgren Lake near Hay Springs, Nebraska.

== Description ==
Differing accounts offer wide-ranging descriptions of the creature. One of the earliest and most famous examples is that of a local man named J.A. Johnson, who described an animal that was dull grey or brown and similar to an alligator, but much larger and heavier with a horn between its eyes and nostrils. Johnson and two others claimed to see the monster from 20 yards (18 m) away, and the men estimated the creature to be about 40 feet (12 m) long. Other reported sightings claim that the alleged animal was similar to a very large catfish or mudpuppy. The Nebraska State Historical Society lists an alternate contemporary hypothesis that Johnson actually saw an unusually large beaver. Some legends also say that it is a giant horned beast resembling an alligator that eats livestock and ducks.

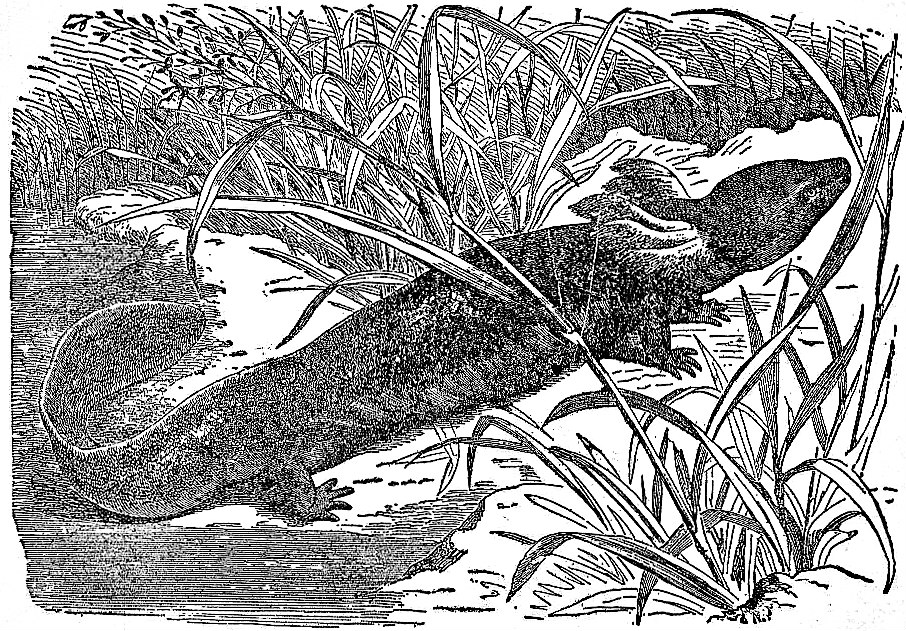
Artist engraving of a common mudpuppy (Necturus maculosus)

== Legend and legacy ==
J.A. Johnson's sighting of the Walgren Lake Monster was preceded by Native American accounts of a similar beast inhabiting the lake. The initial story of a livestock-devouring lake monster sparked curiosity throughout Nebraska and abroad, even reaching the London Times. According to some contemporary articles, efforts were undertaken to capture the monster, though they were not met with success.

In her 1935 biography Old Jules, Mari Sandoz mentioned the monster and its notoriety. Sandoz claimed local fundamentalist Christians believed that the monster was created by Satan to test the faith of locals: "The same devil that scattered the fossil bones over the earth to confound those of little faith could plant a sea monster among the sinners".

As time went on, the legend of the monster evolved to include supposed supernatural abilities. The July 1938 issue of Tall Tales by the Federal Writers' Project in Nebraska offered a description of the monster's massive size, which reportedly caused the earth to tremble whenever he moved such that "the farmers become seasick for miles around". The article went on to claim that the monster came ashore daily to eat large numbers of livestock and, in doing so, created a thick green mist that disoriented travelers in the area.

The January 1962 edition of Outdoor Nebraska repeated the story as recorded in the 1938 telling, specifically corroborating the disorienting fog. The 1962 article exaggerates the claims of the 1938 story further by claiming a group of "eastern innocents" had fallen victim to the creature's earth-shaking and had been bounced from Hay Springs to Valentine, over one hundred miles (160 km) away.

The legend of the Walgren Lake Monster was likely created and distributed by John G. Maher, a Nebraska politician and newspaperman, as a sensational story to sell more newspapers. Maher is known for several other hoaxes perpetrated in Nebraska, such as burying a cement casting of a Buffalo Soldier in an archeological site near Chadron and proclaiming it a "petrified man", sinking bags of soda in a hot spring and reporting on the healing properties of the "soda springs", and warning that the British Navy was sailing up the Mississippi and Missouri rivers to punish Irish immigrants who supported the Irish Republic. Regardless of the probable hoax, the village of Hay Springs has embraced the monster as a local symbol, selling commemorative shirts and buttons as well as creating a replica of the creature based on Johnson's original description out of green flotation material.

== See also ==
- Sea monster
- List of cryptids
- Hoax
- Sandhills (Nebraska)
