= Lake Tianchi Monster =

Alleged lake monster on Mount Paektu

Creature information
- Other name: Lake Chonji Monster
- Sub grouping: Lake monster

Origin
- First attested: 1903
- Country: China/North Korea
- Region: Heaven Lake
- Details: Found in water

Lake Tianchi Monster is the name given to what is said to be a lake monster that lives in Heaven Lake (known as Cheonji in Korean) located in the peak of Baekdu Mountain within the Baekdu-daegan and Changbai mountain ranges encompassing Jilin Province of China and Ryanggang Province of North Korea. According to Beijing Youth Daily, an estimated 20 monsters were reported; however, "scientists are skeptical that any large creature would be able to survive in the lake given its recent history of volcanic activity", and skeptics say "it's all in the imagination, or just a floating volcanic rock".

== Sightings ==
The first reported sighting was in 1903. It was claimed that a large buffalo-like creature attacked three people, but was shot six times. The monster then retreated under the water.

In 21 to 23 August 1962, a person using a telescope reportedly saw two of the monsters chasing each other in water. More than a hundred people reported the sightings.

More recent reports describe the monster as having a human-like head attached to a 1.5-meter (5 ft) neck. It is said to have a white ring around the bottom of its neck, and the rest of its skin is grey and smooth.

In 2007, Zhuo Yongsheng, a Chinese TV reporter said he had shot a 20-minute video of six unidentified creatures in the volcanic lake on 6 September. He later sent still photos to Xinhua's Jilin provincial bureau. According to a news report one of these showed the six "Nessies" swimming in parallel in three pairs. Another one of them featured the animals closer together, leaving circular ripples on the lake surface.

Zhuo said he had seen the six seal-like, finned creatures swimming and frolicking in the lake for an hour and a half, before they disappeared around 7:00 a.m. "They could swim as fast as yachts and at times they would all disappear in the water. It was impressive to see them all acting at exactly the same pace, as if someone was giving orders," he said. "Their fins—or maybe wings—were longer than their bodies."

== In popular culture ==
The Mountain Goats' 2008 album, Heretic Pride features the song, "Tianchi Lake" about the monster: "Backstroking on the surface, moonlight on its face / Floats the Tianchi monster, staring into space."

== See also ==
- Champ (folklore)
- Loch Ness Monster
- Mokele-mbembe
- Ogopogo
- Korean dragon (Imugi)
