= Pend Oreille Paddler =

Cryptid in Idaho, USA

Lake Pend Oreille & local North Idaho towns.

The Pend Oreille Paddler is a cryptid which inhabits Lake Pend Oreille in North Idaho. Many doubt its existence, stating the Paddler sightings could be passed off as a naval submarine on a practice dive, a sturgeon of behemoth size, waterlogged trees, stolen boats, or even off-the-rails railroad cars.

== History ==
The monster's first appearance in the North Idaho lake was reported in 1944. Upon learning the date, many locals think the monster may have been a submarine from the Farragut Naval Training Center, now Farragut State Park. The odd shapes seen below water were possibly submarines taking deep dives in Lake Pend Oreille, a practice which began during World War II and continued through the Cold War.

Alleged sightings began again in the 1970s, renewing rumors of a large, silver monster inhabiting the lake. Then in 1977 a young girl, playing at Sandpoint City Beach, survived a monster attack, whom the reporters dubbed the "Pend Oreille Paddler". In late 1984 it was found that the "Paddler" turned out to be a 12-foot papier-mâché catfish used in a play that had appeared in Sandpoint in October 1974. The moniker stuck.

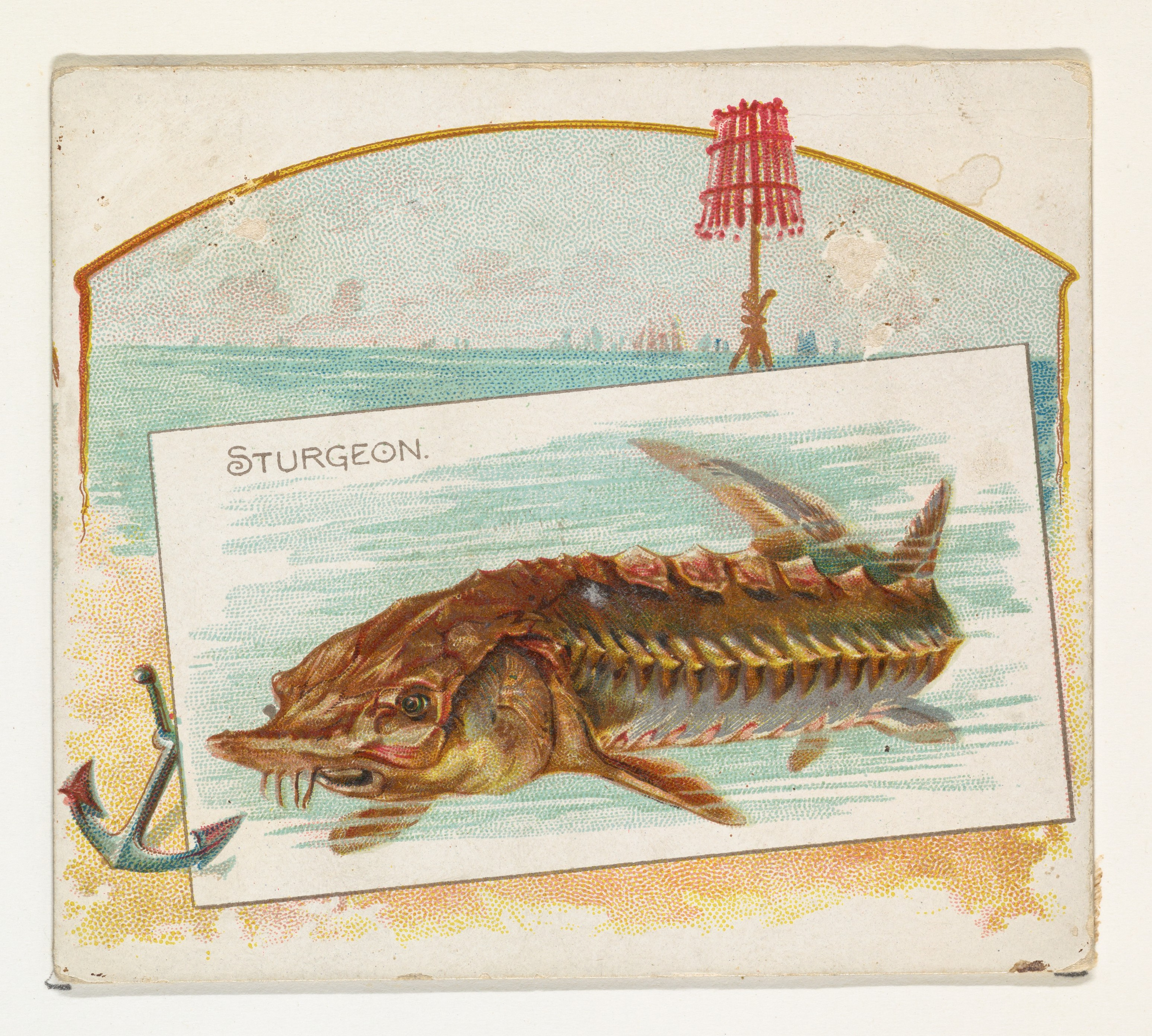
Sturgeon, from "Fish from American Waters" series (N39) for Allen & Ginter Cigarettes

In 1983, a local North Idaho College (NIC) professor, James R. McLeod, created a cryptozoology club at the Coeur d'Alene college and after reading an appendix in Loren Coleman's book, Mysterious America, decided to investigate the local lake and its monstrous inhabitant. McLeod's team of cryptozoologist researchers (made up of the cryptozoology club members) set out to Lake Pend Oreille in search of the Paddler. His investigation concluded after the team discovered the tabloid photo of the Paddler was of a papier-mâché catfish, 12 feet in length and originally from a 1974 Sandpoint play. However, he did propose that the monster could be a real deep water fish, possibly a pre-historic sturgeon.

Another sighting occurred in 1985 on Memorial Day by a local Coeur d'Alene teacher, Julie Green, who gave chase to the "gunmetal grey object" that appeared only a few hundred yards away from her boat. Followers of James R. McLeod's research would state that this description adds credibility to the following theory: the U.S. Navy created the monster to cover up top-secret nuclear submarine and sonar testing conducted in Lake Pend Oreille.

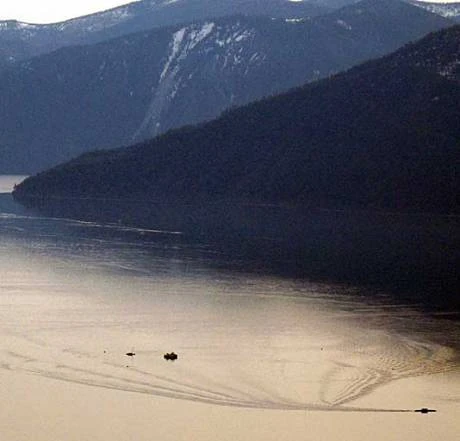
The image was taken on March 29, 2007, from Grouse Mountain, Idaho, by The River Journal’s staff photographer, Jay Mock.

The final, officially documented, sighting happened in 2007; a photo was sent to the CryptoMundo site and reported there by cryptozoologist, Loren Coleman.

In 2009, Washington State University professor, Dr. Michael A. Delahoyde, created a "Monsters" course for the English Department of the university and used James R. McLeod's book as a reference for the section on lake monsters. The study of local folklore continued when best-selling author, Nicholas Redfern wrote his Monsters of the Deep in 2021.
