= Lariosauro =

Lake monster in Italian folklore

Creature information
- Grouping: Legendary creature
- Sub grouping: Lake monster

Origin
- First attested: 20th century
- Country: Italy
- Region: Lake Como
- Details: Found in water

In Italian folklore, Lariosauro is a lake monster said to live in Lake Como in Italy, about 50 km (30 miles) north of Milan. Como is one of the deepest European lakes, at about 410 m (1,300 feet) at the deepest location.

A sighting by two hunters was reported that on 18 November 1946 at Pian di Spagna (a reserve separated from Lake Como), was reported in the local newspaper Corriere comasco, but it was completely a hoax perpetrated by the press. Subsequently yet another Como-based paper, La Provincia reported a second sighting at Varenna, and the large monster was allegedly seen a few years back, though these were two more fabrications. Achille Combi (who wrote the piece in Corriere comasco) wrote that the crested head of the monster emerged out of water, its body length was 2–3 meters, and "bristling with extremely hard, reddish-brown scales". The news coverage went national. La Provincia published a follow-up piece a few days later suggesting it might have been a sturgeon.

The creature earned the nickname lariosauro, but this was the same name legitimately used a century before to name a prehistoric reptile whose fossilized remains were found by the lake (Lariosaurus balsami).

There were other sightings, or alleged sightings, in Lake Como.

- In 1954 in Argegno a creature with round muzzle and back and webbed paws.
- In August 1957 an enormous monster in the waters between Dongo and Musso.
- In September 1957 a strange animal whose head was described as similar to a crocodile head.
- In 2003 a giant eel, 10–12 m (33–39 feet) long, in Lecco.

Skeptic researcher Giorgio Castiglioni, who studied these cases, thinks that the animal of 1954 was an otter, the monster of August 1957 a hoax, the beast of September 1957 possibly a pike, and the 2003 eel was a group of fish swimming together.
