= Morag (lake monster) =

Mythical creature

Creature information
- Other name: Mòrag (Scottish Gaelic)
- Sub grouping: Loch monster

Origin
- First attested: 1887
- Country: Scotland
- Region: Loch Morar
- Habitat: Water

Morag (Scottish Gaelic: Mòrag) is the nickname given to a loch monster believed by many to live in Loch Morar, Scotland. After Nessie, it is among the most written about of Scotland's legendary monsters. "Morag", a Scottish female name, is a pun on the name of the loch. Reported sightings date back to 1887, and numbered 34 incidents by 1981. Sixteen of these involved multiple witnesses.

A widely reported claim from August 1969 involved two local men, Duncan McDonell and William Simpson, and their boat, with which they claimed to have accidentally struck the creature, prompting it to attack them. McDonell defended with an oar, and Simpson opened fire with his rifle, whereupon it sank slowly out of sight. They described it as being brown, 25–30 feet (7.6–9.1 m) long, with rough skin, three dorsal humps rising 18 inches (46 cm) above the loch's surface, and a head a foot wide, held 18 inches (46 cm) out of the water.

== See also ==
- Muc-sheilche (Loch Maree and environs)
