= Gaasyendietha =

Legendary serpent in Indigenous folklore

Gaasyendietha (Seneca: Gá:šöje:ta’, Onondaga: Hadawinétha’, Tuscarora: Tharęhyawáˀkę), also known as the meteor dragon according to Seneca mythology, is a giant serpent that dwells in the deep areas of rivers and lakes in Canada, especially Lake Ontario. This serpent could fly on a trail of fire and spew flames, which has led to comparisons with European dragons.

It is also known as the "meteor dragon", in reference to its supposed origin from a meteoroid that had impacted the Earth, and is said to be capable of crossing the heavens on a trail of fire. It has also been referred to as the "fire lion", which is the Haudenosaunee analogue to the underwater panther.

In some versions of the Haudenosaunee creation story, Gaasyendietha caught Atahensic as she fell to earth from the Sky World.

In the tale "Ganyadjigowa", the hero Ganyadjigowa (The Mudhen) was killed by Gaasyendietha, in the form of an old man.

== See also ==
- Underwater panther – Legendary creature in Indigenous folklore
- Horned serpent – Legendary serpent found in the mythology of many cultures
- Thunderbird – Legendary Indigenous North American creature
