= Muc-sheilche =

Cryptozooid

Creature information
- Sub grouping: Lake monster
- Folklore: Local legend

Origin
- Country: Scotland
- Region: Loch Maree
- Habitat: Water

In Scottish folklore, Muc-sheilch(e) (Scottish Gaelic pronunciation: [muxkˈhelɪçə]) is a lake monster said to live in Loch Maree, and its neighbouring lochs. The term loosely translates as "turtle-pig."

== See also ==
- Lake monster
- Morag (lake monster)
