= Lukwata =

Folklore

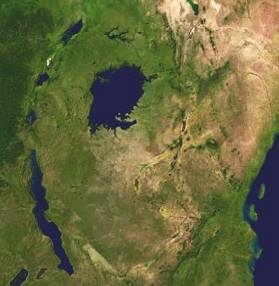
- The African Great Lakes region, from where most Lukwata stories stem.

Creature information
- Grouping: Legendary creature
- Sub grouping: Lake Monster

Origin
- Country: Uganda, African Great Lakes
- Details: Found in lakes, rivers and swamps

Lukwata (Luganda for 'sea serpent', the nominal form of kukwata, lit. 'to seize') is a legendary water-dwelling creature in Baganda folklore, said to be found in Lake Victoria or at least the Uganda portion of the lake. It has been described as 20–30 feet long, with dark smooth skin and a rounded head, and known to attack fishermen and boats. It's stories and folklore may have also been related in some way to stories of spirits and deities surrounding canoes and fishing. Pieces of the Lukwata were thought to have magical properties and were revered as relics in eastern Africa.

Despite the nature of the legend, there is no scientific evidence to support the existence of Lukwata or any other similar creature in Lake Victoria. Despite this, the Lukwata remains an important part of the cultural and historical fabric of Uganda and the cultural identity of the Baganda people.

== History ==
British colonial administrator C. W. Hobley wrote, in 1913, that people living on both (east and west) sides of Lake Victoria told stories of the Lukwata. He also reported that the "Ja Luo" people told stories of it attacking fishing canoes, and described his own uncertainty as to whether the stories, if real, could have had their origins in large pythons or some unknown animal. Ideas that the Lukwata may actually represent an unknown animal persisted in other sources from the early to mid 20th century: it appeared in a 1937 article entitled "African Mystery Beasts", though more recent sources prefer to focus on the Lukwata and stories surrounding it as a cultural phenomenon
