= Lake monster =

Lake-dwelling creature in myth and folklore

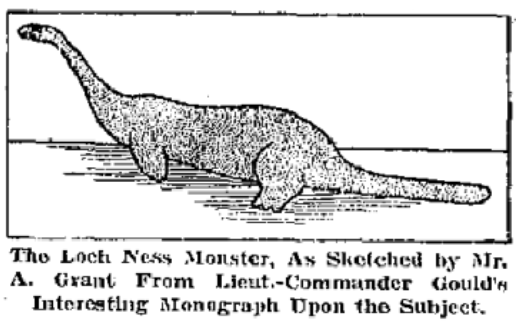
The Loch Ness Monster is a famous example of a “lake monster”

A lake monster is a lake-dwelling creature in myth and folklore. The most famous example is the Loch Ness Monster. Depictions of lake monsters are often similar to those of sea monsters.

In the Motif-Index of Folk-Literature, entities classified as "lake monsters", such as the Scottish Loch Ness Monster, the American Chessie, and the Swedish Storsjöodjuret fall under B11.3.1.1. ("dragon lives in lake").

== Theories ==
According to the Swedish naturalist and author Bengt Sjögren (1980), present-day lake monsters are variations of older legends of water kelpies. Sjögren claims that the accounts of lake-monsters have changed during history, as do others. Older reports often talk about horse-like appearances, but more modern reports often have more reptile and dinosaur-like appearances; he concludes that the legendary kelpies have evolved into the present day saurian lake-monsters since the discovery of dinosaurs and giant aquatic reptiles and the popularization of them in both scientific and fictional writings and art.

The stories cut across cultures, existing in some variation in many countries. and have undergone what Michel Meurger calls concretization (the process of turning items, drawings, general beliefs and stories into a plausible whole) and naturalization over time as humanity's view of the world has changed.

In many of these areas, especially around Loch Ness, Lake Champlain and the Okanagan Valley, these lake monsters have become important tourist draws.

In Ben Radford and Joe Nickell's book Lake Monster Mysteries, the authors attribute a vast number of sightings to otter misidentifications. Ed Grabianowski plotted the distribution of North American lake monster sightings and then overlaid this with the distribution of the common otter and found a near perfect match. It turns out that three or four otters swimming in a line look remarkably like a serpentine, humped creature undulating through the water, very easy to mistake for a single creature if you see them from a distance. "This isn't speculation. I'm not making this up," Nickell said. "I've spoken to people who saw what they thought was a lake monster, got closer and discovered it was actually a line of otters. That really happens." Of course, not every supposed lake monster sighting can be attributed to otters, but it is an excellent example of how our perceptions can be fooled.

Paul Barrett and Darren Naish note that the existence of any large animals in isolation (i.e., in a situation where no breeding population exists) is highly unlikely. Naish also observes that the stories are likely remnants of tales meant to keep children safely away from the water.

There have been many purported sightings of lake monsters, and even some photographs, but each time these have either been shown to be deliberate deceptions, such as the Lake George Monster Hoax, or serious doubts about the veracity and verifiability have arisen, as with the famous Mansi photograph of Champ.

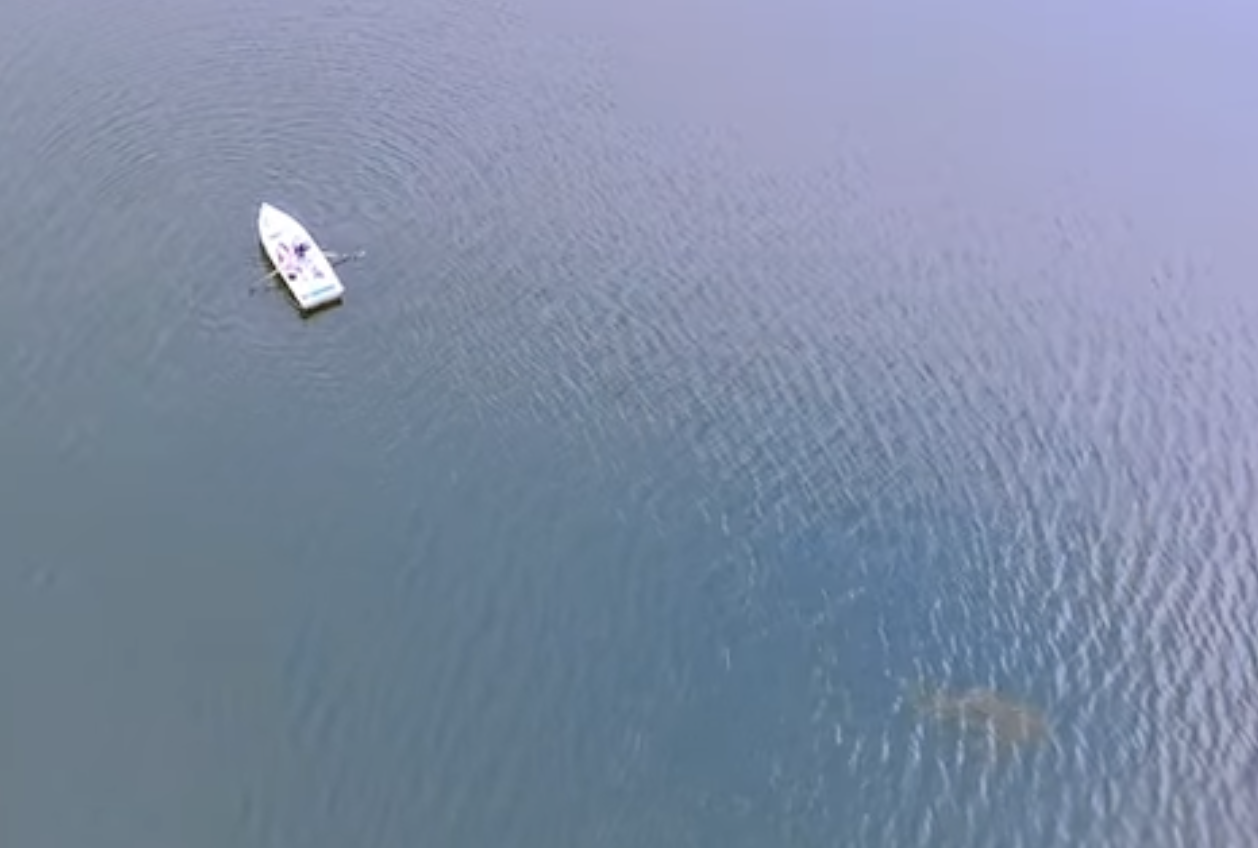
Still shot from 5 minute drone footage of Champ swimming behind boat containing two lead actors in the "Lucy & the Lake Monster" film

The most recent lake monster sighting to get widespread attention occurred during post-production of the Champ movie Lucy and the Lake Monster. The filmmakers reviewed their drone footage from production on August 2, 2024, and noticed what appears to be a large creature swimming just below the surface of the water, in Bulwagga Bay. The alleged plesiosaur image is visible in the bottom right portion of the screen, swimming behind a boat containing the two lead actors in the film. The boat was 142 inches from the tip of the bow to the stern and 50.5 inches at the widest point and the alleged plesiosaur appears bigger than the boat. One of the co-writers, Kelly Tabor, believes it to be a foundational piece of evidence for Champ. The second co-writer, Richard Rossi, referred to himself as the "Doubting Thomas," and he shared the entire five minutes of footage with a conclave of scientists with earned doctorates in science for further study of the Tabor-Rossi footage.

== Examples ==
Well-known lake monsters include:

- Mishipeshu, in Lake Superior, Canada and US
- Nessie, in Loch Ness, Scotland
- Morag, in Loch Morar, Scotland
- Lagarfljót Worm, in Lagarfljót, Iceland
- Ogopogo, in Okanagan Lake, Canada
- Lariosauro, in Lake Como, Italy
- Champ, in Lake Champlain, Canada and US
- Memphre, in Lake Memphremagog, Canada and US
- Bessie, in Lake Erie, Canada and US
- Nahuelito, in Nahuel Huapi Lake, Argentina
- Muyso, in Lake Tota, Colombia
- Van Gölü Canavarı, in Lake Van, Turkey
- Inkanyamba, in Howick Falls, South Africa
- Tahoe Tessie, in Lake Tahoe, US
- Flessie, in Flathead Lake, US
- Iliamna Lake monster, in Lake Iliamna, US
- Brosno dragon, in Lake Brosno, Russia
- Mussie, in lake Muskrat, US and Canada

== See also ==
- River Monsters – Wildlife documentary television series
