= Champ (folklore) =

Alleged lake monster in Lake Champlain, United States

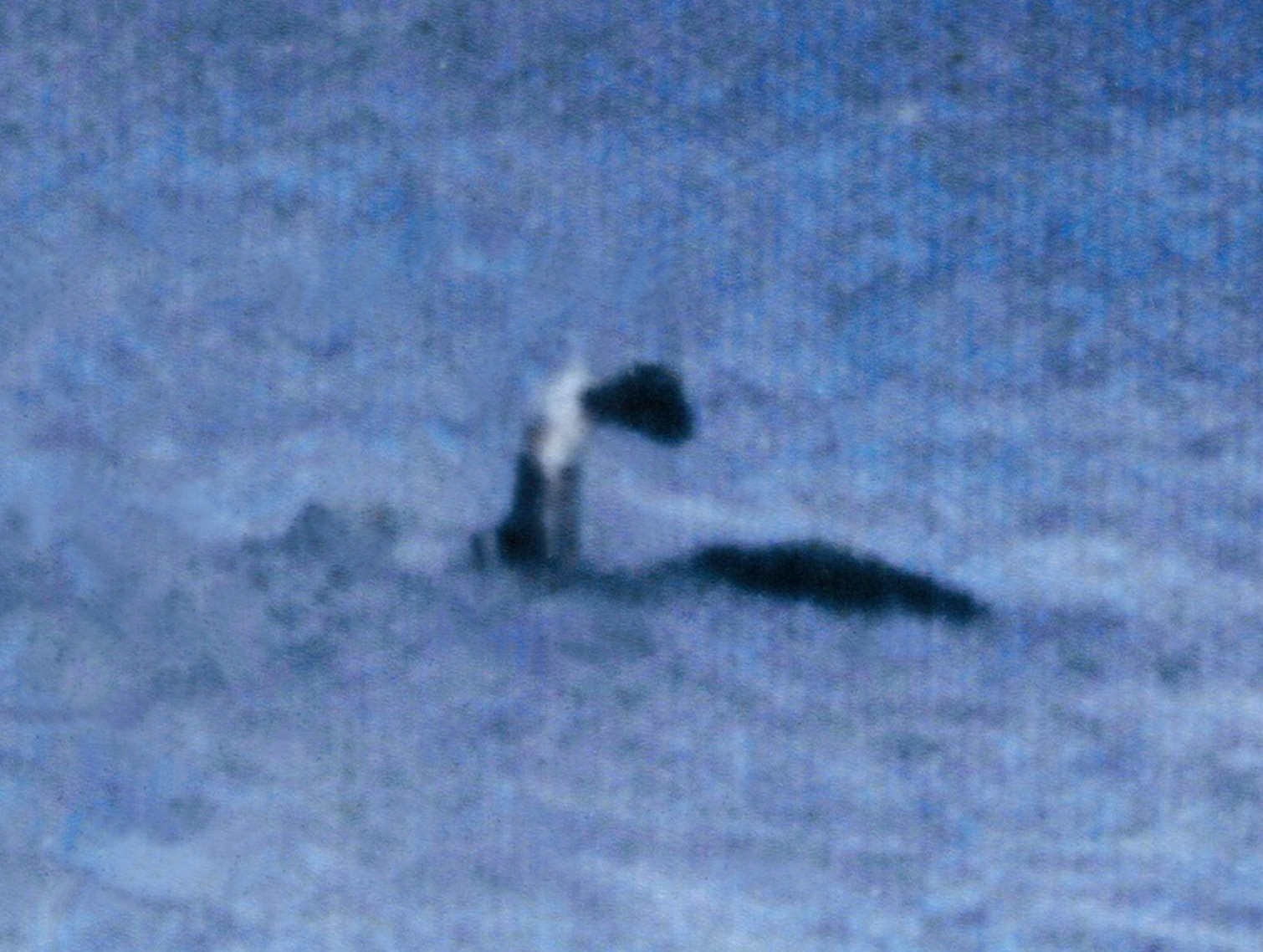
- Champ in the Mansi photograph.

Creature information
- Other name(s): Lake Champlain Monster, Champy
- Sub grouping: Lake Monster / Sea Serpent
- Similar entities: Loch Ness Monster, Ogopogo, Altamaha-ha, Tahoe Tessie, Nahuelito

Origin
- Country: United States, Canada
- Region: Lake Champlain
- Habitat: Water

In American folklore, Champ or Champy is the name of a lake monster said to live in Lake Champlain, a 125-mile (201 km)-long body of fresh water shared by New York and Vermont, with a portion extending into Quebec, Canada. The legend of the monster is considered a draw for tourism in the Burlington, Vermont and Plattsburgh, New York areas.

Map of Lake Champlain watershed

== History of the legend ==
Over the years, there have been over 300 reported sightings of Champ.

The original story is related to Iroquois legends of giant snakes, which the Mohawk named Onyare'kowa.

French cartographer Samuel de Champlain, the founder of Québec and the lake's namesake, is often claimed to be the first European to have sighted Champ, in 1609. The earliest source for this claim is the summer 1970 issue of the magazine Vermont Life. The magazine quoted Champlain as having documented a "20 ft (6.1 m) serpent thick as a barrel, and a head like a horse." There is no evidence that Champlain ever said this, although he did document large fish:

There is also a great abundance of fish, of many varieties: among others, one called by the savages of the country Chaoufarou, "which varies in length, the largest being, as the people told me, 8 or 10 ft (2.4 or 3.0 m) long. I saw some 5 ft (1.5 m) long, which were as large as my thigh; the head being as big as my two fists, with a snout 2.5 ft (0.76 m) long, and a double row of very sharp and dangerous teeth. Its body is, in shape, very much like that of a pike; but it is armed with scales so strong and a poniard could not pierce them. Its color is silver-gray.

The 1878 translation of his journals clarifies that Chaoufaou refers to gar (or gar pike), specifically Lepisosteus osseus (the longnose gar).

An 1819 report in the Plattsburgh Republican, entitled "Cape Ann Serpent on Lake Champlain", reports a "Capt. Crum" sighting an enormous serpentine monster. Crum estimated the monster to have been about 187 ft (57 m) long and approximately 200 yd (180 m) away from him. Despite the great distance, he claimed to have witnessed it being followed by "two large Sturgeon and a Bill-fish" and was able to see that it had three teeth and eyes the color of peeled onions. He also described the monster as having "a belt of red" around its neck and a white star on its forehead.

In 1883, Sheriff Nathan H. Mooney claimed that he had seen a water serpent about "20 rods" (the equivalent of 110 yd (100 m) in length) from where he was on the shore. He claimed that he was so close that he could see "round white spots inside its mouth" and that "the creature appeared to be about 25 to 30 ft (7.6 to 9.1 m) in length". Mooney's sighting led to many more alleged eyewitnesses coming forward with their own accounts of Champ.

The legend of Champ captured the interest of P. T. Barnum, and in 1873 and 1887, the famous showman offered rewards for anyone who could bring him the monster.

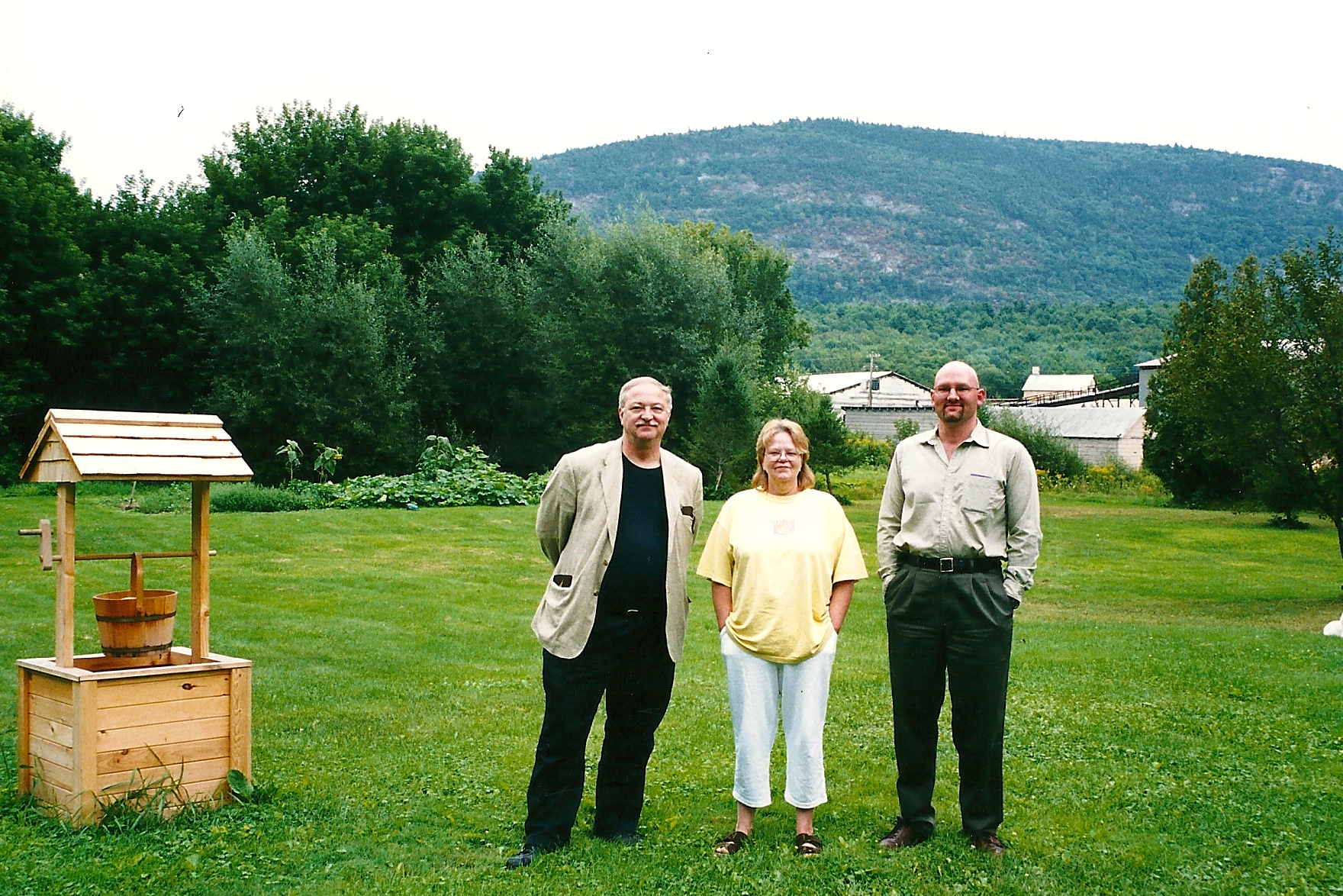
Sandra Mansi with investigators Joe Nickell and Benjamin Radford

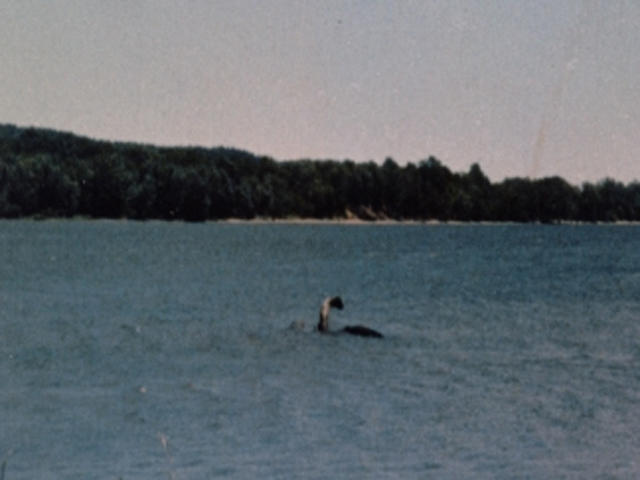
Full Mansi Photograph

In 1977, Sandra Mansi took a photograph while on vacation with her family that appears to show an animal with a long neck emerging from the lake. The entire bay of the lake where the photograph reportedly was taken is no deeper than 14 feet (4.3 m). According to Joe Nickell, it is unlikely that a giant creature could swim, let alone hide, in such shallow water. It has been suggested that the object in the photograph could possibly be a rising tree trunk or log. In the book The Untold Story of Champ by Robert E. Bartholomew, it is further revealed that the original photo was sent to Philip Reines, a nautical expert at the State University of New York at Plattsburgh, so that he could examine and hopefully authenticate it. Reines quickly realized that the two most vital elements in verifying the photo were missing. Sandra Mansi said that she had thrown away the negative, and that she could not locate where she snapped the photo. Without the negative or location it was impossible to determine with any degree of certainty what was in the photo. Possessing the negative would allow the image to be magnified to see greater detail, while knowing the location could reveal important clues such as the object's size and distance, and whether the photo was even taken on Lake Champlain. Reines could not authenticate the photo and the story behind it led to big questions and potential red flags detailed in his book.

Champ reportedly can be seen in a video taken by fishermen Dick Affolter and his stepson Pete Bodette in the summer of 2005. Close examination of the images may be interpreted either as a head and neck of a plesiosaur-like animal and even an open mouth in one frame and a closed mouth in another; or as a fish or eel. Although two retired FBI forensic image analysts, who reviewed the tape, said it appears authentic and unmanipulated, one of them added that "there's no place in there that I can actually see an animal or any other object on the surface".

Related, the recording of sounds from within the lake by the Fauna Communications Research Institute in 2003, working as part of a Discovery Channel program. The group described the sounds as being similar to those produced by Beluga whales or dolphins—neither of which are known to live in Lake Champlain. An article describing the recordings has been published to scientific literature, explaining that the sounds were likely a form of echolocation despite none of "the known native creatures" being able to echolocate.

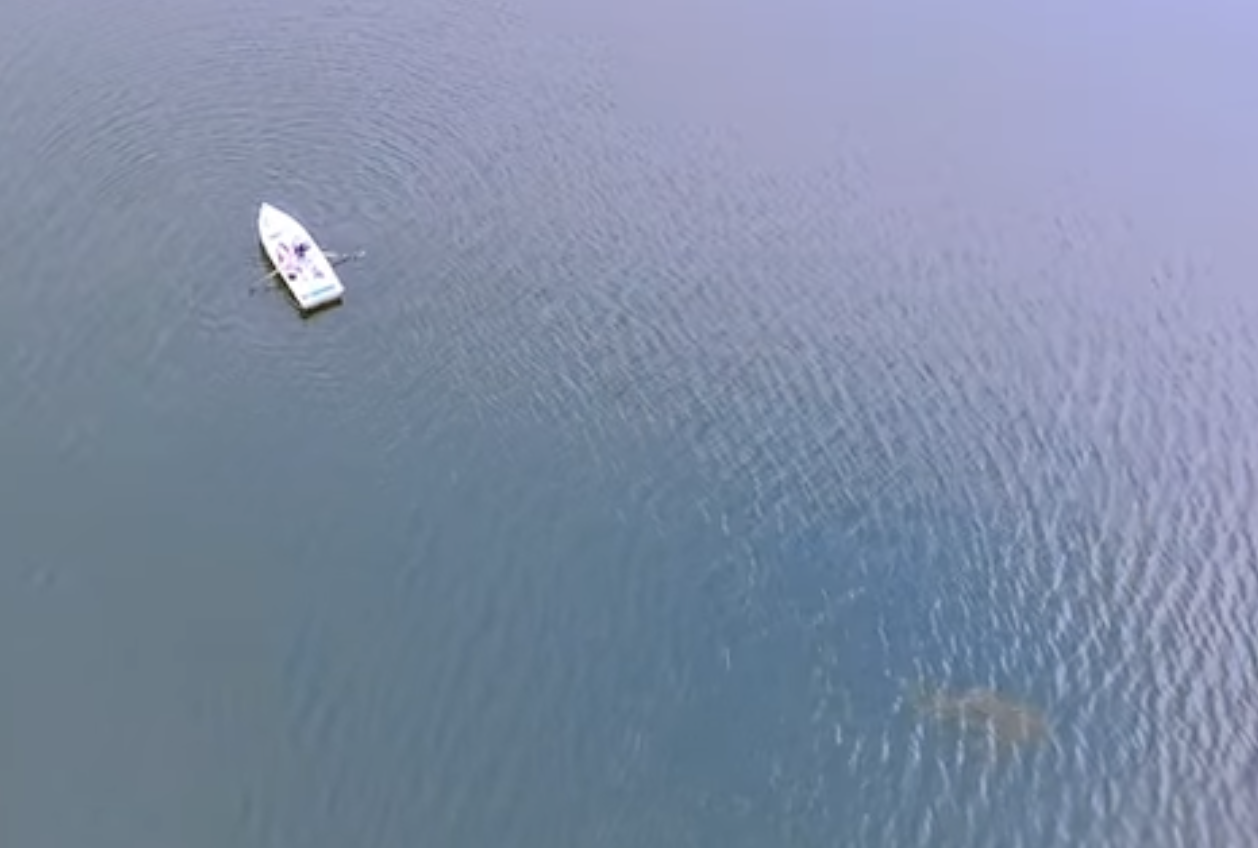
Still shot from 5 minute drone footage of Champ swimming behind boat containing two lead actors in the Lucy and the Lake Monster film

During post-production of the film Lucy and the Lake Monster, the filmmakers reviewed their drone footage from production on August 2, 2024, and noticed what appeared to be a large creature swimming just below the surface of the water in Bulwagga Bay. The alleged creature is visible in the bottom right portion of the screen, swimming behind a boat on which the two lead actors of the film were aboard. The boat was 142 inches from the tip of the bow to the stern and 50.5 inches at the widest point, and the alleged creature appears to be larger than the boat.

One of the co-writers, Kelly Tabor, believes it to be a foundational piece of evidence for Champ. “It looked like the skinny neck was oscillating back and forth, as if it was grazing underwater. My eyes were just popping out,” Tabor said.

The second co-writer and director of the film, Richard Rossi, said that he shared the footage with scientists. A ten-second clip of a distinct, large entity moving, an excerpt from the longer twelve-minute footage, was shared publicly on YouTube and went viral worldwide, garnering millions of views.

Scottish tourists in America for the FIFA World Cup, saw front-page news coverage of the Tabor-Rossi footage in the Daily Mail, New York Post, and National Enquirer. The Champ footage inspired them to adopt Champ as their "World Cup mascot," and proclaim him "Nessie's cousin."

On October 3, 2025, William Shatner presented the Tabor-Rossi footage on his program The UnXplained, a television series on History. The show had various experts analyze the footage, and the conclusion was that this was corroboration that Champ might be real.(Season 7, Episode 15, "Terrors of the Deep.")

On August 25, 2026, the Adirondack Daily Enterprise, Sun Community News, and The State reported that Rossi and Tabor are officially convening an elite, five-member scientific review panel to conduct a private, frame-by-frame analysis of the continuous 12-minute and 57-second drone master reel and its unmanipulated camera metadata. The filmmakers launched a formal three-week application window for accredited university marine biologists, oceanographers, zoologists, and digital video forensics experts holding active institutional research positions. Following a private review period to evaluate wake physics and environmental stability, the filmmakers committed to total public transparency, scheduling a complete open-source public release of the full unedited drone master reel and the panel's formal scientific findings for November 9, 2026.

== Cultural importance to New York and Vermont ==
Vermont Lake Monsters mascot

The Champ legend has become a revenue-generating attraction. For example, the village of Port Henry, New York, has erected a giant model of Champ and holds "Champ Day" on the first Saturday of every August. As the mascot of Vermont's baseball team, the Vermont Lake Monsters, Champ became more prominent after the team was renamed from the Vermont Expos following the 2005 season. Champ has been the primary attraction of the former Minor League Baseball team since their inception, and continues to serve as the Futures Collegiate Baseball League team's mascot. This mascot version of Champ appears as a special guest at various charitable and other functions throughout Vermont. Several nearby establishments, including a car wash, use images of Champ as a logo.

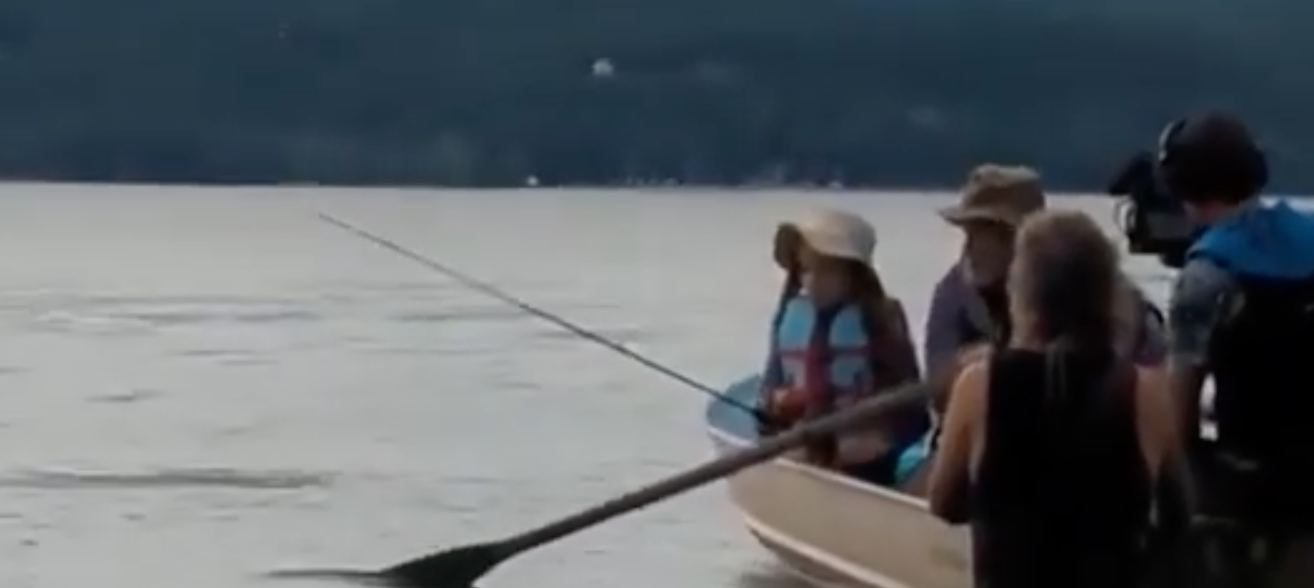
Cameramen film on Lake Champlain for the film Lucy and the Lake Monster.

In 2022, media reported that a feature film, Lucy and the Lake Monster, was in the works about a young orphan girl and her grandfather looking for Champ, the film being based on a children's book with the same title.

The production filmed in Port Henry, New York and in various locations around Lake Champlain's Bulwagga Bay in July and August, 2022. Newspapers in the Lake Champlain region reported the film finished in 2024, and premiered in the Lake Champlain region in September, 2024. As of 2025, the film has garnered multiple awards on the film festival circuit.

Champ's existence serves as a backdrop for Joseph A. Citro's novel Dark Twilight (1991).

Champ is mentioned as being an example of a monster inhabiting Lake Champlain in The X-Files episode titled "Quagmire" in which characters hunt an animal believed to be an "aquatic dinosaur."

== See also ==
- Altamaha-ha – Legendary creature in folklore from Georgia, US
- Cadborosaurus – Sea monster named for Cadboro Bay in Canada
- Chessie – Legendary sea monster in the folklore of Chesapeake Bay
- Gloucester sea serpent – Alleged sea monster off Cape Ann, Mass.
- Lake Tianchi Monster – Alleged lake monster on Mount Paektu
- Memphre – Legendary lake monster of Lake Memphremagog
- Mokele mbembe – Water-dwelling entity that supposedly lives in the Congo River Basin
- Mussie – Monster rumored to live in Muskrat Lake in Ontario, Canada
- Nessie – Mythical creature in Scottish folklore
- Ogopogo – Creature in First Nations folklore and alleged lake monster
- Storsjö monster – Lake monster in Swedish folklore
