= Baseball's Last Hero: 21 Clemente Stories =

- Theatrical release poster
- Directed by: Richard Rossi
- Written by: Richard Rossi
- Starring: Jamie Nieto; Marilinda Rivera
- Distributed by: Amazon; Vimeo; Tubi; Roku; YouTube
- Release date: August 18, 2013
- Country: United States

Baseball's Last Hero: 21 Clemente Stories is a 2013 American biographical sports film. The movie is an independent film about the life of Major League Baseball player Roberto Clemente. It is the first feature dramatic film on Clemente's life and was written and directed by California filmmaker and Pittsburgh native Richard Rossi and stars two-time Olympian high-jumper Jamie Nieto in the title role of Roberto Clemente and Project Runway Winner Marilinda Rivera as his wife Vera Clemente. Clemente made his Pittsburgh debut in 1955 and went on to be named to 12 all-star teams while leading the National League in batting four times, winning one most valuable player award and two World Series rings.

== Theme and structure ==
The film dramatizes how the Hall of Famer faced racism, dedicated himself to humanitarian work, and died in a plane crash en route to Nicaragua to deliver supplies to earthquake victims in 1972. The “21 Clemente Stories” are 21 vignettes, each from a letter in his complete name using the 21 letters in Roberto Walker Clemente. "The first “R” stands for Rookie and the last “E” for earthquake, referring to the Nicaraguan quake that led to Clemente's death on an aid mission," Rossi said. "I want people to learn about Clemente, to feel the emotion of the true love he felt for his family, his fans, his team, and the disadvantaged poor he died helping". One of the scenes in the movie features a conversation Clemente has with a nun.

The scene spurred a push for Clemente's canonization as a Catholic saint, including from Rossi. "I've never thought of him in terms of being a saint", said Neil Walker, whose father was a teammate of Clemente. "But he's somebody who lived his life serving others, really. So if it would happen, I wouldn't be terribly surprised by it."

Some claim the canonization requirement of a miracle was met on July 22, 2017, when Jamie Nieto, who was paralyzed from the neck down in a backflip accident three years after the Clemente film was released, walked 130 steps at his own wedding to fellow Olympian Shevon Stoddart. The miracle was predicted by Rossi as a demonstration of the power of God.

== Production ==
Rossi worked on the writing of the screenplay for five years, but his stories originated in childhood. When he was growing up in the West View section of Pittsburgh, he sat in Three Rivers Stadium and watched Clemente advance the Pittsburgh Pirates to the 1971 World Series. Clemente's attitude towards his fans made an impression on Rossi. “He used to say it is most important to spend the greatest amount of time doing things you love,” Rossi said. “He would talk about people in mills spending money on tickets for games, and how impressed he was at that. It was before free agency, but I don't think it would have mattered.” As Rossi recalls, he wrote about Clemente for so many assignments in elementary school (starting in third grade) that one of the teachers finally chastised him for it.

Rossi had difficulty casting the lead. "I'd find someone who looked like him and had those aspects, but they wouldn't be a good athlete," said Rossi. "I'd play catch with them, have them swing the bat. I didn't think we'd find all of those components." Richard Rossi appears in a supporting role playing the part of the agent "Birddog," who persuaded Clemente to leave the Brooklyn Dodgers to play for the Pittsburgh Pirates. Rossi believed that Clemente is just as important to the sport of baseball as Jackie Robinson and thinks that his number should be universally retired like the color-barrier breaking Dodger. He originally planned to make the film with a budget like that of "42: The Jackie Robinson Story," but health problems prompted him to jumpstart production and stop waiting for an elusive check from a wealthy investor. “My doc said ‘these kind of moments are wake up calls…if there’s anything you want to do,’” Rossi said. “I said ‘I want to make my Clemente movie’ which is an odd response. Most people want to go on vacation or tour Europe or something. I wanted to make this film.” The actors and technicians volunteered their time and donated their services to the project, the film is a blend of news and game footage along with scripted and acted scenes.

== Exhibition ==
Rossi returned to Pittsburgh to premiere his film to two sold-out screenings at the Strand Theater on Roberto Clemente's birthday, August 18, 2013. Ron Carter, owner of the century-old Strand, hosted the premiere. “We have done any number of shows here, but this is our very first film premiere,” Carter said. After Pittsburgh's premiere, Rossi exhibited the film in New York, Los Angeles, San Francisco, other cities, small art theaters, Roberto Clemente High School in Chicago, the Wild Goose Festival in North Carolina, and on DVD.
