= Themes in Minority Report =

Academic analyses of 2002 film

Witwer catches the ball: having predetermined its inevitable course, he intervenes to prevent its fall upon the ground.

The plot of the 2002 science fiction neo-noir film Minority Report, based on the 1956 short story of the same name by Philip K. Dick, includes a number of themes. The film's plot centers around a trio of psychics called "precogs", who see future images called "previsions" of crimes yet to be committed. These images are processed by "Precrime", a specialized police department, which apprehends the criminals based on the precogs' foreknowledge. The cast includes Tom Cruise as Precrime officer John Anderton, Colin Farrell as Department of Justice agent Danny Witwer, Samantha Morton as the senior precog Agatha, and Max von Sydow as Anderton's superior Lamar Burgess. The film is a combination of whodunit, thriller, and science fiction.

Spielberg has characterized the movie's story as "fifty percent character and fifty percent very complicated storytelling with layers and layers of murder mystery and plot." The film's central theme is the question of free will vs. determinism. It examines whether free will can exist if the future is set and known in advance. It also concerns itself with the role of preventative government in protecting its citizenry, which was apt at the time of the picture's release given America's debates over the government's expanding powers after 9/11.

Minority Report presents a future of increasing electronic surveillance, personalized advertising, and it analyzes the role of media in a future state where electronic advancements make its presence nearly boundless, the potential legality of an infallible prosecutor, and Spielberg's repeated theme of the broken family. Spielberg's analysis of the familial aspect was motivated by his own parent's divorce when he was a child.

== Free will vs. determinism ==
"We don't choose the things we believe in; they choose us."

— Lamar Burgess

The main theme of Minority Report is the classic philosophical debate of free will vs. determinism. One of the main questions the film raises is whether the future is set or whether free will can alter the future. As critic C. A. Wolski commented, "At the outset, Minority Report... promises to mine some deep subject matter, to do with: do we possess free will or are we predestined to our fate?" However, there is also the added question of whether the precogs' visions are correct. As reviewer James Berardinelli asked, "is the Precogs' vision accurate, or has it in some way been tampered with? Perhaps Anderton isn't actually going to kill, but has been set up by a clever and knowledgeable criminal who wants him out of the way." The precog Agatha also states that since Anderton knows his future, he can change it. However, the film also indicates that Anderton's knowledge of the future may actually be the factor that causes Leo Crow's death. Berardinelli describes this as the main paradox regarding free will vs. determinism in the film, "[h]ere's the biggest one of all: Is it possible that the act of accusing someone of a murder could begin a chain of events that leads to the slaying. In Anderton's situation, he runs because he is accused. The only reason he ends up in circumstances where he might be forced to kill is because he is a hunted man. Take away the accusation, and there would be no question of him committing a criminal act. The prediction drives the act – a self-fulfilling prophecy. You can see the vicious circle, and it's delicious (if a little maddening) to ponder." Film scholar Dean A. Kowalski argues that in this scenario free will still exists, as the perpetrators control their actions, and the precogs' visions are but the facts that resulted from their choices.

The central theme of the movie is discussed in the film's fourth scene. Witwer discusses the PreCrime system with the division's staff. He believes that its main "legalistic drawback" is that it "arrests individuals who have broken no laws." Jad responds, "But they will!" When Anderton later arrives upon this discussion, he acknowledges the paradox Witwer raises; that the precogs' prevent an event accepted as fact, but one which will never happen. To show him that people regularly use predetermination, Anderton picks up a wooden ball and rolls it toward Witwer, who catches it before it lands on the ground. When asked why he caught the ball, Witwer says "Because it was going to fall." Anderton replies, "But it didn't." Then confidently tells him, "The fact that you prevented it from happening doesn't change the fact that it was going to happen." Kowalski feels this example is faulty in the sense that the ball has no free will; it merely acts according to the laws of physics, but he acknowledges that if an individual were to have freely chosen to commit murder, then it would hold. Film scholar Stephen Mulhall points out that unlike the laws of physics which have a series of scientifically testable causal laws, Anderton merely has the visions of the precogs', whose psychic abilities are not fully explained by science.

Another quandary is that if the precogs' visions are infallible then the future cannot be otherwise, while if they are incorrect people will be punished for crimes they will never commit. Kowalski contends that the precogs only attain knowledge of what he calls the "conditional future". He cites as evidence two examples: the scene where Agatha steers Anderton through the mall by foreseeing dangerous events and helping him circumnavigate them, and a later scene where she tells Anderton and his ex-wife what would have happened to their child if he had lived. In the first example, Agatha knows what Anderton will freely choose to do when presented with specific facts so she provides them to him, and, in the second, she knows what will have happened to the Anderton's son based on specific scenarios throughout his life, in which she can see what he would have freely chosen to do, and what selections various people in his life would have freely made. According to Kowalski, the PreCrime unit therefore removes individuals from precise situations where they would freely choose to become a murderer.

Philosophy professor Michael Huemer says "that the only way the otherwise predetermined future seen by the precogs can be averted, we are led to believe, is by the influence of the precogs themselves." He argues that their "knowledge of their would-be future" enables them to make changes to prevent its occurrence. This means that Howard Marks, the arrested potential killer from the film's opening scene, is destined to his fate and no action he could undertake would change it. Individuals with minority reports however, have a chance to change their futures according to Huemer, and since there was no minority report (i.e.; no possible alternative fate) for Anderton, he could only change his future by having access to the precogs' visions. Huemer compares the humans situation to that of a robot; since a robot controls itself, but has a set number of programmed actions, its fate falls within those actions. It lacks free will in the sense that it cannot choose any action outside of its programming, even if one may exist. He also considers a decaying atom which has a 50% chance of survival within the next hour, since the atom has no actions which it can undertake to change those odds, its fate is pure chance. Thus he believes a person needs a set of options, the knowledge of those options, and the ability to choose between them to have free will.

== Political and legal ==
Spielberg said that the arrest of criminals before they have a chance to commit their crimes in the movie had some real-world background in post-9/11 America, saying that "[w]e're giving up some of our freedom so that the government can protect us." The future world in Minority Report of retinal scans, robotic human inspectors, and intrusive, individualized, public advertising arrived in American theaters as the country was debating how much governmental intrusion into personal matters was necessary to ensure safety of its citizens. Spielberg said he would be against a PreCrime system if it were ever possible, as he believes that if it did exist, those in control of it would undoubtedly abuse its powers. Kowalski questions what the benevolent precogs in the film could become in the hands of those who trained their skills for political intrigue. Science fiction scholar Gary Westfahl asserts that in a political context, PreCrime may be seen "a metaphor for racial profiling, and one could view the liberation of the precogs as the end of a form of slavery."

Kowalski feels the isolation of the precogs ensures that they see their visions merely as facts, and removes them from having to justify them. The precogs' ignorance of the results of their visions prevents them from knowing the effectiveness of the program. He feels the PreCrime officers are thus more qualified to evaluate their efficacy "than the precogs themselves." In the December 2003 edition of the academic journal Film Criticism, scholar Mark Garrett Cooper moved past that point by asserting that not only have the precogs "yet to fully understand" their visions, but that the process by which the images are interpreted makes it so that no one individual could understand them without the use of the apparatus. The machinery is so effective and precise according to Cooper however, that the "omnipresent system effectively makes capture more certain than the crime." When the system targets Cruise, instead of fleeing, he remains in the vicinity in the belief that the system will, in its inexorable logic, correct itself. The apparatus is considered so infallible according to Cooper that Cruise knows once he is cleared by it, his life can immediately return to normal. In this respect, Cooper feels that "far from indicting a security state, the film legitimates one." Gareth Higgins argues that "[t]he government is playing God, using an all-seeing eye to prevent murder."

The film presents a legal system where the PreCrime office gathers the images from the minds of the precogs then organizes them into a coherent order for display in front of a set of judges. The judges appear via video feeds, analyze the images, and according to Cooper, they view the images, listen to Anderton rattle off "a string of legalistic verbiage", then give it a "pro forma ratification." Thus the accused is never present, is not allowed a defense, and is convicted before he is aware he is on trial. The program is marketed in a similar basic fashion, as in its tag line: "It works." Cooper says that in a typical American courtroom drama, the audience is treated as if it were the jury, but in this system, instead of desiring the hero be proven innocent, the audience seeks instead to have the guilt transferred from Anderton to Burgess. But to do so, Anderton has to disprove the system, which he does by proving the existence of the minority report. This renders the PreCrime justice system inoperable, as if there is doubt related not merely to the gathering of the images, or their ability to be interpreted, but their ability to be correct even in perfect circumstances, then the system of infallible guilt can not exist.

== Media ==
Spielberg conceived of the idea of a future world permeated with intrusive capitalism and government surveillance after everyone at the "think tank summit" told him that "the right of privacy is a diminishing commodity" which will soon be thrown "right out the window." According to film critic J. Hoberman, Minority Report "visualizes (as well as demonstrates) a future where the unconscious has been thoroughly colonized." When the movie first appeared in theaters a common source of reviewers' complaints was the film's product placement, which they found intrusive. Film scholar Martin Hall says that the purpose of the advertisements Anderton runs into are "encouraging him to buy certain products and, by extension, affirm his place in society." The personalized advertising is disconcerting partly because of the invasion of privacy, but also, argues Cooper, because it is cold, impersonalized, and insincere.

Cooper discusses how he feels Minority Report emphasizes the future importance over the control of imagery. According to him, the images captured from the precogs' visions in the film bestow power on those who control their processing. He says the film warns viewers that those who control images must be carefully overseen so as to prevent the abuse of power, and that the film presents "governance as a problem of image arrangement." The film also presents a future world where government probes use advanced media technology to monitor its citizenry. Cooper says the quandary arises when the film intimates that there were will be no way to escape the media industry's omnipotence in the future, while at the same time defending "the need for image manipulating institutions." He feels that this logically raises another issue in that the same concern could be leveled towards image-makers such as DreamWorks, and he says the "film's virtue lies in provoking this question." He notes that the film's tranquil ending concludes with the Andertons looking out into a peaceful exterior with only rain visible, and the precogs reading in their isolated, idyllic farm, and both families apparently free of electronic surveillance.

== Self-perception ==
Writing in the academic journal Rhizomes, scholar Martin Hall, while analyzing the film, discusses the self-perception an individual develops based on the views of those outside of themselves. The academician notes that when a child first comprehends the function of a mirror, they begin to develop the understanding that their perception of themselves is not self-contained, and learn partly they are what they see in the mirror. He contrasts this to when Anderton discovers the precogs' vision of his future self. At the beginning of the film, Anderton shows little concern for the precogs; when Witwer feels pity for them, he responds: "It's better if you don't think of them as human." Shortly thereafter, however, Anderton is shown in tears at his home, high on the hard drug neuroin while mourning the loss of his son. Agatha enters a similar period of self-examination when she has visions of her mother's death, and is informed they are merely "echoes" i.e. a faulty image in her memory. Anderton becomes flustered when he begins to interpret the images which show him about to commit murder and begins to frantically sort through, According to Hall he begins "searching for whatever possible versions of this representation are available to him, other than the one that represents him as a murderer." Hall says that he is sorting through the images so feverishly, as he is convinced once they are sorted properly and understood, they will not show him to be the murderer, because he is convinced that he is not a murderer. He literally becomes obsessed with himself, seeking to resolve these images with put him at "discordance with his own reality." Previously, at peace with himself, Hall says Anderton cannot accept the image he sees in the precogs' visions. Unable to reconcile the two, Hall says that he is forced to decide that "it is likely that errors have occurred" in the PreCrime system.

When he escapes the building and enters the mall, Hall feels he is disturbed by advertisements calling to him by name not only because they will give away his presence, but also because they remind him of his lost place in society, and he begins "to see through the false consciousness his (illusory) previous position as fixed subject had allowed him." Spielberg said that Anderton is being punished for his previous callous unconcern for anything but the effectiveness of the PreCrime program. "He's dirtied by the fact that he doesn't spend much time thinking about the moral consequences. It's just like a sporting event almost — and then suddenly that whole sporting event makes him the soccer ball." His doubts about his own future lead him to examine his previous life to better understand himself according to Hall. He runs through his role in the PreCrime system, and his son's disappearance "to reconstruct his past." After Leo Crow in fact kills himself, Anderton becomes healed, and later has "recreated himself as the subject he was previously through the knowledge that he is not a killer." Although he has satisfactorily repaired his self-image, Anderton is not the same person, as he not longer believes in the PreCrime system. Hall says that Burgess' final dilemma; namely, his desire to keep PreCrime running, his inability to bring himself to kill Anderton, and his desire to live, drives him to see his only suitable action to be suicide. "Burgess has been left truly alone by events," argues Hall. "His wife fainted when she saw the images of the murder and Anderton has been the cause of this rupture."

== Broken family ==
I still carry my childhood along with me. I'm old enough now to compartmentalise it—so I consciously try not to go too far back into my childhood, but the subconscious part of me still creates traces of it in Minority Report. Tom Cruise has suffered a tragic personal loss—he has lost his child and his wife has left him. It still reminds me of the divorce of my parents. As much as I try to get away from it I still can't avoid it.

— Spielberg

Minority Report also continues Spielberg's tradition of depicting broken families. In Dick's short story, Anderton is a childless, married man whose main motives are self-preservation and preventing the disassembly of the PreCrime division. While he is also trying to save himself in the movie, his greater concern is uncovering the story behind his son's disappearance. Spielberg would later transform his next science fiction film, War of the Worlds, from a story about a single man to one about a divorced father concerned with protecting his children. Buckland notes that the two tragic parent-child relationships in the picture (Agatha and Ann Lively, John and Sean Anderton) have a common element. The movie has four shots of them submerged in water. Agatha's face is shown in a close up shot, taken from directly above her, when she is submerged in her photon milk, nutrient bath. When photos of her mother's submerged corpse are shown to her, the emphasized photograph is a similar image of her face taken from directly above. Anderton and his son are shown together in a pool flashback scene in which they have a contest to see who can hold their breath longest. John is underwater when his son is taken, and later in the apartment he is shown lying motionless, immersed in a filled bathtub, in a manner Buckland finds similar to the shots of Agatha and Ann. Buckland notes that co-screenwriter Frank introduced the water theme, as he wrote Agatha and her mother's back stories while adding the bathtub scene.

== Sources ==
- Buckland, Warren (2006). Directed by Steven Spielberg: Poetics of the Contemporary Hollywood Blockbuster. Continuum. ISBN 0-8264-1691-8.
- Conrad, Mark T. (2007). The Philosophy of Neo-Noir. The University Press of Kentucky. ISBN 978-0-8131-2422-3.
- Cornea, Christine (2007). Science Fiction Cinema: Between Fantasy and Reality. Rutgers University Press. ISBN 978-0-8135-4173-0.
- Higgins, Gareth (2003). How movies helped save my soul. Relevant Books. ISBN 0-9714576-9-7.
- Huemer, Michael (2009). Susan Schneider (ed.). Science fiction and philosophy: from time travel to superintelligence. John Wiley and Sons. ISBN 978-1-4051-4907-5.
- Dean A. Kowalski, ed. (2008). Steven Spielberg and Philosophy: We're Gonna Need a Bigger Book (ebook). The University Press of Kentucky. ISBN 978-0-8131-2527-5.
- Jackson, Kathi (2007). Steven Spielberg: A Biography (ebook). Greenwood. ISBN 978-0-313-33796-3.
- Mulhall, Stephen (2008). On Film (ebook). Thinking in Action. Routledge. ISBN 978-0-415-44153-7.
- Vest, Jason P. (2007). Future Imperfect: Philip K. Dick at the Movies. Praeger. ISBN 978-0-275-99171-5.
