= WORD-FM =

- Pittsburgh, Pennsylvania; United States
- Broadcast area: Pittsburgh metropolitan area
- Frequency: 101.5 MHz
- Branding: 101.5 WORD FM

Programming
- Language: English
- Format: Christian radio
- Affiliations: SRN News; Townhall

Ownership
- Owner: Salem Media Group; (Salem Communications Holding Corporation)
- Sister stations: WPGP; WPIT

History
- First air date: 1948
- Former call signs: WPIT-FM (1948–93)
- Call sign meaning: The "Word" of God

Technical information
- Licensing authority: FCC
- Facility ID: 58627
- Class: B
- ERP: 43,000 watts
- HAAT: 161 meters (528 ft)
- Transmitter coordinates: 40.4840°N 79.9925°W

Links
- Public license information: Public file; LMS
- Webcast: Listen live; Listen live (via Audacy)
- Website: www.wordfm.com

WORD-FM (101.5 MHz) is a Christian talk radio station based in Pittsburgh, Pennsylvania. Owned by the Salem Media Group, the station broadcasts with an ERP of 43 kW. Its transmitter is located in Reserve Township, Pennsylvania.

== History ==
In Pittsburgh, WORD-FM was originally on the 104.7 frequency (now WPGB). Salem Communications, which had formed in the early 1980s by Christian broadcasters Ed Atsinger and Stuart Epperson, had first made overtures to purchase WPIT and WPIT-FM from Associated Communications back in the mid-1980s, but the station had been sold to Boston-based Pyramid Broadcasting, which operated the WPIT stations under the name Kiss Limited Partnership, for a much higher price than what Salem was willing to pay.

Still recognizing the profit potential for Christian-formatted radio in Pittsburgh despite a competitor, Salem entered into an agreement with Pittsburgh-based Gateway Broadcasting Enterprises, which owned WYDD (now WPGB) and WKPA (now WMNY), both operating out of New Kensington, a suburb of Pittsburgh. The deal was signed in 1987, but due to legal complexities between the two companies, it would not be until January 1990 that the deal between Salem and Gateway was consummated.

Salem still had yet to obtain the contracts for the ministries that would provide the programming for the station. By the time of their takeover, WYDD had become Top 40 rocker WNRJ, which stayed around for about a year. Upon Salem's acquisition, WNRJ's format was immediately changed to beautiful music provided by Salt Lake City-based Bonneville Broadcasting and its airstaff laid off. The call letters were changed to WEZE-FM (sharing a base call sign with a Salem-owned AM station in Boston) and the station adopted the moniker "Easy 104.7".

WKPA, which operated independently of its FM sister since 1940, had its weekday programming substituted with a simulcast of WEZE-FM, but kept existing separate specialty programming on the weekends.

In August 1991, Salem announced that WEZE-FM would change to the heritage Christian-formatted radio formula that had become the staple of its other high-powered FM stations. Salem purchased the WORD call letters, which belonged to an AM station in Spartanburg, South Carolina, for $20,000. The format change took place in October, and 104.7 became WORD-FM.

In September 1991, Richard Rossi began broadcasting his nightly radio show Rich Rossi Live on Pittsburgh's WPIT-FM. The program created controversy when Rossi challenged the sale to Salem, calling Christian radio and other evangelical churches "whores" who sell out the gospel for money.

=== Salem acquires WPIT ===
In 1992, after a lengthy series of negotiations, the opportunity presented itself again for Salem to acquire WPIT and WPIT-FM. New Federal Communications Commission (FCC) rules governing ownership allowed Salem to hold more than two licenses simultaneously, and a deal was made for Salem to buy out its former rival and spin their existing stations off to new owners.

WKPA was spun off to Pentecostal Temple Development Corporation in November 1992 as a gift. PTDC was the business arm of Pentecostal Temple Church of God, pastored by former WPXI-TV reporter Dr. D. Loran Mann. WORD-FM 104.7 was also sold off to Entercom, which operated country music competitor WDSY-FM, and had been looking for an FM station for a duopoly property.

=== WORD-FM merger with WPIT ===
The transaction took place in January 1993, and WORD-FM moved its current call letters and format to 101.5, which had been the FM partial simulcast of WPIT. Some of WPIT-FM's existing programming elements were retained, but much of the programming mirrored WORD-FM's original format that began on 104.7.

The 104.7 facility then came under the control of Entercom in a local marketing agreement deal with Salem until it was purchased outright six months later. The new 104.7 was assigned the call letters WXRB and adopted the moniker "Rebel 104.7 Hit Country" after stunting for a brief period with a classic rock format and the name "U.S. 104.7".

WPIT, which had been running all ministry-based conservative programming all day, then began to run contemporary Christian music during the afternoon and evening hours to appease listeners who had grown accustomed to hearing the format on WPIT-FM prior to the ownership change.

=== WORD-FM today ===
WPIT, which for years had been co-located with WPIT-FM at Gateway Towers in downtown Pittsburgh, joined the new WORD-FM at its home at Seven Parkway Center in Greentree, located just off Interstate 279 south of the Fort Pitt Tunnells. WORD-FM still maintains the ministries as the mainstay of its programming, but has in recent years added contemporary Christian music back into its programming.

Unlike many other major market radio stations, WORD-FM has a stable, secure staff, some of whom have been with the station since its format switch from beautiful music to Christian talk. General Manager Chuck Gratner (also known in the 1960s and 1970s as West Coast DJ legend Chuck Roy) managed WORD-FM from its start-up until his retirement in 2014. Former WORD-FM sales manager Tom Lemmon was appointed to succeed Gratner. Kenny Woods, formerly mid-days at crosstown oldies WWSW-FM, has been at the station since 2001.

== Weekend music ==
On weekends (Saturday and Sunday), WORD-FM plays Christian music during the early morning, afternoon, and evening on Saturdays, and during the early morning and afternoon on Sundays. Kenny Woods is the DJ during the afternoon and Chris Reynolds hosts the Pop Top 20 Countdown on Saturdays evenings.
