= Brosno dragon =

Lake monster in Russian folklore

Brosno Dragon
Creature information
- Other name: Brosnya
- Grouping: Legendary creature
- Sub grouping: Lake monster

Origin
- First attested: 13th century AD
- Country: Russia
- Region: Tver
- Details: Lake Brosno

The Brosno Dragon, also known as Brosnya (Russian: Бросня), is a supposed lake monster in Russian folklore said to inhabit Lake Brosno near Andreapol in western Russia. It is described as resembling a dragon and is the subject of a number of regional legends, some of which are said to date back to the 13th century.

== Explanations ==
Skeptical explanations for the identity of the Brosno Dragon have included a misidentified beaver or giant pike.

== History ==
In the 18th and 19th centuries, rumors circulated that the alleged creature would emerge from the water's surface late in the day, but immediately submerge upon the approach of humans. A 20th-century legend claims that the animal consumed either a German or Italian airplane during World War II.

== See also ==
- "Labynkyr Devil" – Alleged lake monster in Lake Labynkyr, Russia
- Limnic eruption – Type of natural disaster
- List of lake monsters
- Loch Ness Monster – Mythical creature in Scottish folklore
- Monster of Lake Tota – Colombian mythological creature
