= Flathead Lake Monster =

Mythical lake monster within Montana folklore

The Flathead Lake Monster is a lake monster of Indigenous legend and Montana folklore that is purported to dwell in Flathead Lake in northwestern Montana, United States.

== Native American legend ==
The story of a monster in Flathead Lake originates in a Kutenai traditional legend. According to the story, long ago, the first native tribe in the area lived on an island in the middle of the lake. One winter, while crossing the frozen lake to move camp, two girls saw antlers approximately 2 feet (0.61 metres) in length protruding through the ice. Assuming they belonged to some animal, the girls decided to remove the antlers and take them home. When they used sharp-edged rocks to cut through the ice, the antlers suddenly began to shake. The frozen surface of the lake split open around them, and the head of a monster appeared through the ice, shaking its giant antlers. The girls used their special powers to transform into a ball and a buckskin target to escape the monster, but half of the tribe drowned in the lake, which is said to be the reason why there are so few Kutenai people. The narrative holds that the Kutenai never strayed far from the lakeshore after that, and white settlers later reported occasionally seeing the monster.

== Local stories ==
According to retired newspaper editor Paul Fugleberg, local tales of the Flathead Lake Monster go back more than 100 years. It was supposedly first reported in 1889 by Captain James C. Kerr of the lake steamboat U.S. Grant. Kerr claimed he and his 100 passengers saw an unusually large whale-like object in the water. According to the story, one of the passengers on the steamer shot at the creature and sent it diving for safety.

Fugleberg notes that local residents have named the purported lake monster "Flessie", inspired by Loch Ness' "Nessie". Contemporary reports of sightings of "Flessie" by local residents and visitors average one or two each year; however, in 1993 alone, there were about thirteen reports. The monster is usually described as a large, round, eel-shaped creature with a wavy body like a snake about twenty to forty feet (6.1 to 12.2 m) long, having brownish to bluish-black skin and grayish-black eyes. It has often been described as looking like a whale or giant sturgeon. According to Fugleberg, "When I was editor of the Flathead Courier at Polson, author Dorothy M. Johnson, then secretary of the Montana Press Association, advised me not to treat sighting reports lightly in newspaper and magazine articles. She said, 'I don't think the monster should be done with tongue in cheek. You have eyewitness accounts by people who were scared and didn't think it was funny.'"

One local story that received considerable publicity described how a 3-year-old boy apparently fell into the lake, and when asked how he had extracted himself, told his mother, "The Flathead monster lifted me up". Fugleberg wrote that claimed sightings of the monster have been blamed on "hyperactive imaginations, playful pranks, natural phenomena such as wave action, shadows, lighting effects, logs and a number of animals, including bears, horses, deer, elk, dogs, a dead monkey, a loose circus seal and even an escaped buffalo". In the 1950s, a significant cash reward was offered by Big Fish Unlimited to anyone who could catch what was termed the "superfish" of Flathead Lake. A man named C. Leslie Griffith was reported to have caught a seven-and-a-half-foot (2.3 m) sturgeon that weighed just over 181 pounds (82 kg), now displayed at the Polson-Flathead Historical Museum.

== See also ==
- Lake monster
- Nessie
