= Richard Rossi =

American film director

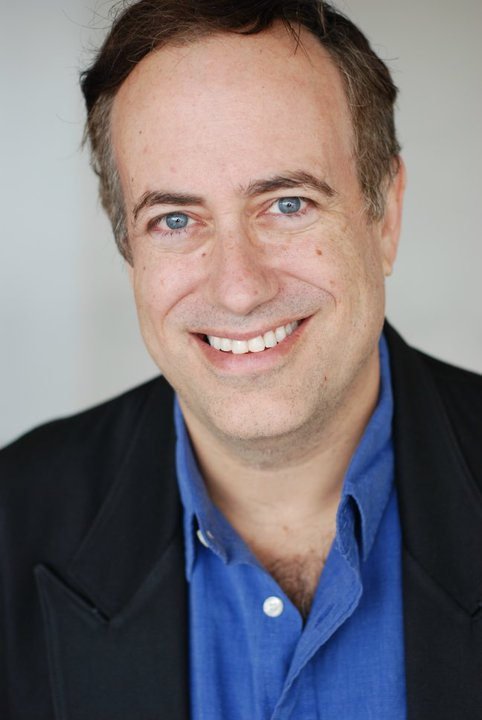
- Rossi in 2011
- Born: March 2, 1963 (age 63); Pittsburgh, Pennsylvania, U.S.
- Education: B.S. & M.A. Religion, Liberty University; A.A. Theater Arts & Cinema Arts, Los Angeles Valley College; MFA in Screenwriting, David Lynch Graduate School of Cinematic Arts
- Alma mater: Liberty University; Los Angeles Valley College; Maharishi International University
- Occupation: Multi-medium artist
- Years active: 1970–present
- Spouse: Sherrie Rossi (1984–present)
- Children: 2

Richard Rossi (born March 2, 1963) is an American filmmaker, actor, writer, talk radio host, musician, and former evangelical minister.

Among Rossi's projects are the film Canaan Land which contained five songs by Rossi, Baseball's Last Hero: 21 Clemente Stories, a biopic on the life of Roberto Clemente and two films about evangelist Aimee Semple McPherson.

In 1995 Rossi went on trial for the attempted murder of his wife. She recanted her original identification of Rossi as her attacker and espoused his innocence. The case ended in a mistrial and was front-page news in Rossi's adopted hometown of Pittsburgh and was widely covered as something of a cause célèbre by syndicated television news programs. Rossi eventually was acquitted of attempted murder but pleaded no contest to an aggravated assault though he and his wife maintained his innocence.

== Early life ==
Rossi's father was a professional jazz guitarist in West View, Pennsylvania; the son followed in his father's footsteps, playing the guitar on stage at age 7.

As a child, Rossi was fascinated with Pittsburgh-based faith healer Kathryn Kuhlman. In 2007, a BBC article mentioned Kuhlman as an influence on a young Rossi, that led him for a time to conduct similar faith-healing services. On May 7, 2026, Charisma (magazine) reported Rossi was producing a film about his childhood recollections of Kuhlman, starring actress-evangelist Gemma Wenger in the role of Kuhlman.

After one of his father's hospitalizations for manic depression, Rossi landed in a surrogate family led by an evangelist who immersed him in Pentecostal preaching and outreach. After a drug overdose, Rossi became a born-again Christian and toured as a rock and roll preacher, usually in tandem with songwriting partner Johnny Walker, playing gospel rock. Rossi and his songwriting partner Walker were featured on The 700 Club.

== Pennsylvania ministries ==
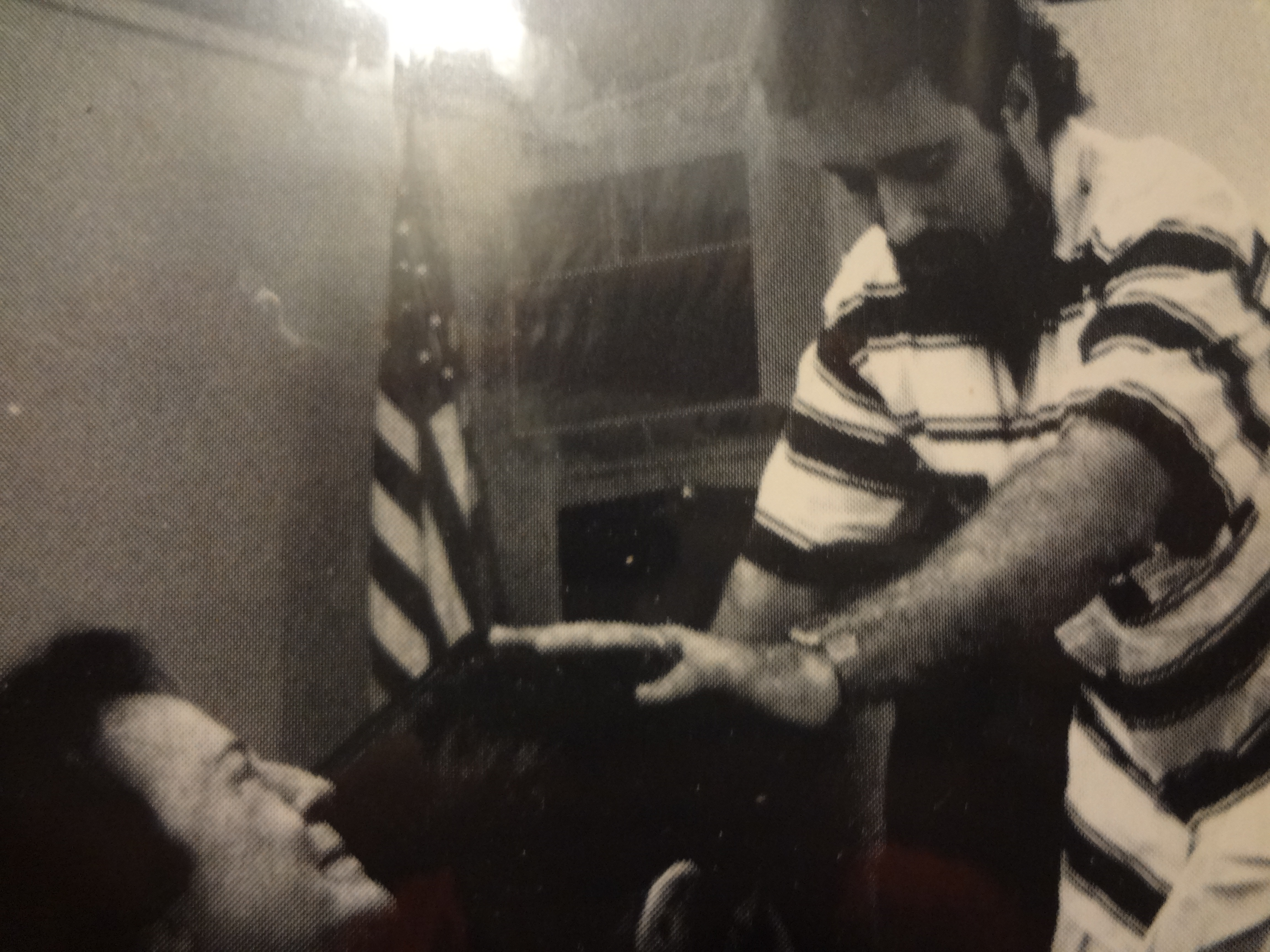
Richard Rossi prays for the sick at one of his faith healing services, September, 1990.

Rossi moved to Lynchburg, Virginia at age 18 to study at Liberty University, where he earned a bachelor's and master's degree in biblical studies.

His second church, created informally with ministry partner Jack Sims, was called "Matthew's Party," the name taken from the biblical story about Jesus eating with tax collectors and sinners at the home of Matthew, the gospel writer. In 1986, Rossi started First Love, a charismatic church. He rented movie theaters and showed films as an evangelistic outreach. Dramatic faith healings allegedly occurred. The healing services, called "Healing Clinics," grew from 200 to 2000. Rossi filmed the healings and co-produced a documentary on faith healing and exorcism in 1992 entitled Quest for Truth. The program first aired during the fall 1993 season on WPGH-TV 53 and WPTT-TV 22.

In 1988, Rossi tried and failed to change both the name of the Church of the Three Rivers and its affiliation. He then joined the Assemblies of God the next year and led the Cranberry church, but left in 1991, saying that his ministry was too radical for the Assemblies; church officials said he left owing several thousand dollars for the church building.

In September 1991, Rossi began broadcasting his nightly radio show Rich Rossi Live on Pittsburgh's WPIT-FM. The program created controversy when Rossi called other evangelical churches "whores" who sell out the gospel for money. Rossi appeared on the Jerry Springer Show in 1994 to discuss faith healing, exorcism, and ESP.

== Attempted murder charge ==
On June 24, 1994, Rossi's wife, Sherrie Lynn, was found near death in a coma on the side of a Pennsylvania road. She had a crushed skull and was left covered in blood; her injuries were so severe that she needed to wear a helmet. Her rescuers thought she had been in a traffic accident, and called for an ambulance. Ninety minutes later, at 8:05 pm, Richard Rossi called police, and claimed that men killed his wife and shot at him twice. But when police came to interview him, his story changed, first claiming that a man that looked like him got into the passenger side of the car, then that the man who looked like him attacked from the driver's side. Rossi had a cellular phone available, but said he pursued the assailant instead of dialing for help because he was a "good runner." Rossi also changed his story on where the assailants approached from, first saying they were in a white car, then that they "came out of the woods out of nowhere." Police testified that Rossi told them a "satanic cult" was trying to frame him; Rossi denies this. Rossi was wearing only a pair of tan shorts when police interviewed him; Rossi claimed that he lost his shirt running through the woods, but did not explain why he was barefoot. Several witnesses reported seeing a man with long hair near the Rossi's cars, and State Police reports suggested the presence of two other cars, one blue and one white.

In October 1994, Sherrie testified her husband was "not to blame"; a state court judge refused her request to void the order of protection. (Press accounts claimed that Ms. Rossi stated that her attacker might have been a demon in human form, but the Rossis deny she said this.)

Sherrie Rossi testified in the trial that her attacker was a different man with brown eyes and that Rossi's eyes are blue. She said her earlier testimony against Rossi was coerced by police when she was still recovering and did not have a complete recollection, and that her second testimony exonerating her husband came from "flashbacks" and a "fuller complete recollection" of what occurred. A defender of Rossi corroborated Sherrie Rossi's mystery attacker, testifying a passing motorist saw a bearded man matching Sherrie Rossi's description wearing jeans. (Rossi was wearing shorts).

Sherrie Rossi said: "We have eyewitnesses who saw a white car similar to ours following us and several family members several weeks before I was attacked. My husband also received a number of threats before I was attacked. The whole police had one agenda from Day One, and that was to get my husband." During her testimony, Sherrie Rossi wore a shirt with two doll figures labeled "Rich" and "Sherrie" and flashed the American Sign Language sign for love at her husband Richard.

Over Rossi's wife's objections, prosecutors charged him with attempted murder and won a court ruling admitting her earlier testimony at trial. The parties argued whether the blood-soaked interior of Rossi's car was consistent with Sherrie's claim. The secretary of Rossi's church testified that Rossi asked him shortly after the incident to forge an alibi. Sherrie Rossi refuted this, alleging police had framed her husband.

Sherrie Rossi testified, pointing at the prosecutors and police. "Your agenda was to get my husband, and I did not trust you or the lot of them." The defense called two witnesses, a church member and Rossi's mother, for a total of a half-hour of testimony; Rossi himself did not testify.

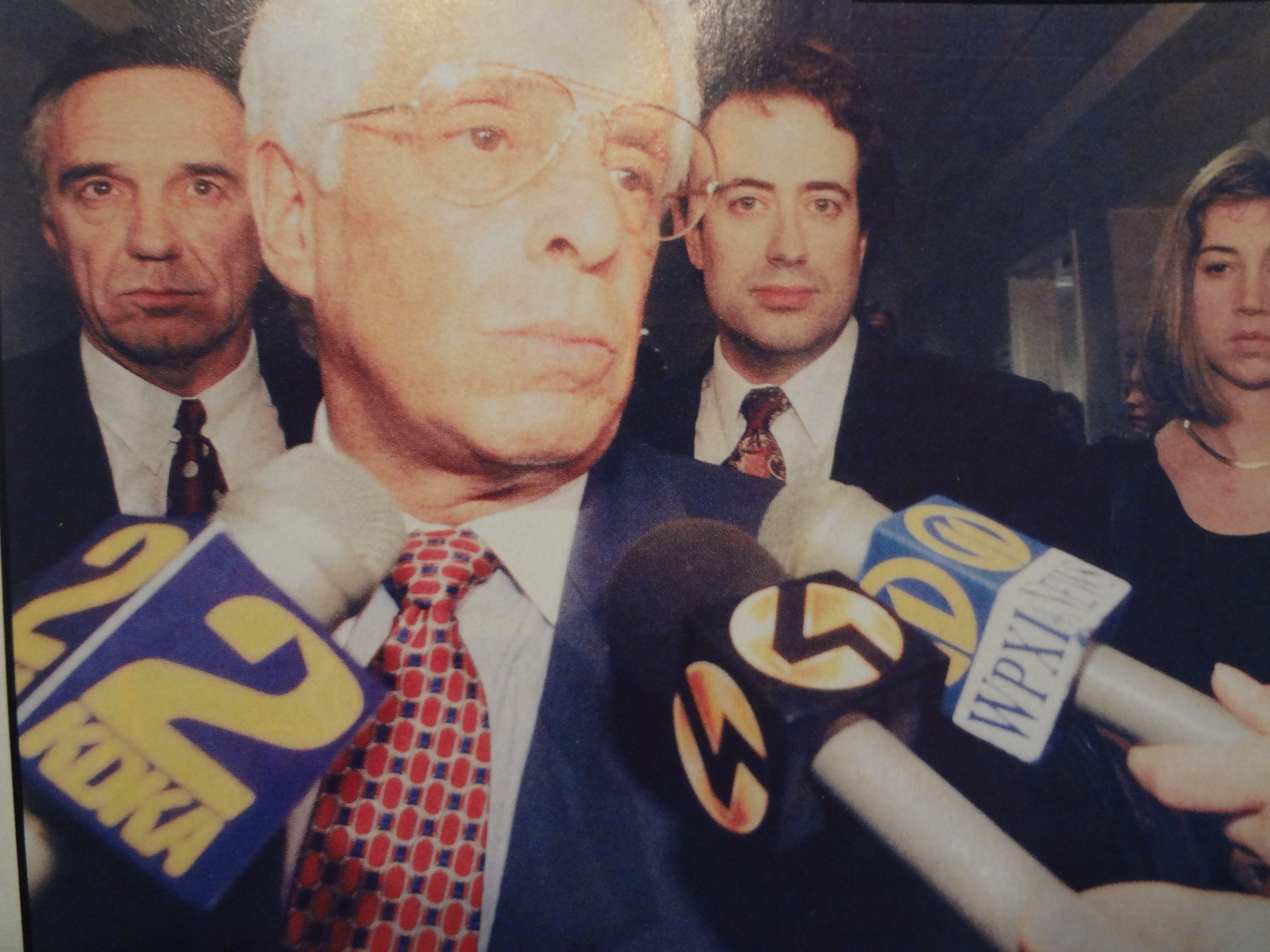
After hearing of the hung jury, Rossi attorney Jim Ecker (foreground) faces the press with attorney Alexander H. Lindsay, Richard Rossi (3rd from left, behind Ecker), and Attorney Susan Jackson at the Butler County Courthouse on March 31, 1995.

A five-day trial ended in a hung jury, with the vote 9–3 in favor of conviction after six and a half hours of deliberation. Before retrial, Rossi pleaded no contest to a count of second-degree aggravated assault while maintaining his innocence. Though his followers wanted him to fight what his wife called an "assault of justice", Rossi stated he pled nolo contendere to end the ordeal. "One of my many goals is to heal our family and become the best husband and father I can be," Rossi said to the judge. He received a four-to-eight-month sentence in Butler County Jail plus four years probation and required domestic violence counseling; he served 96 days.

Domestic violence workers criticized the short sentence. The Rossis renewed their wedding vows after his release. Rossi wrote an apologetic letter to the Pittsburgh Post-Gazette saying: "I repent of the sins I have committed and, with God's help, do not plan to repeat them."

Sherrie Rossi, who had campaigned for her husband's exoneration, sued state and county officials for abridging her civil rights when courts refused to lift a bond restriction forbidding her husband to contact her while he was out on bail; the suit was dismissed by a federal court. In 1996, Sherrie self-published Assault of Justice: The Richard Rossi Mystery, defending her husband and proclaiming his innocence, and claiming that charges were retaliation for exposing police corruption and a satanic cult on his talk radio show. She said eyewitnesses confirmed her husband's innocence and that they had been receiving threats prior to the assault.

While charges were pending and Rossi served his sentence, membership in his church dropped from 300 to 12. Media scrutiny revealed Rossi suffered mental health, depression, and addiction issues similar to his father's. Rossi enrolled in a recovery program in jail that he continued after his release, including meetings four days a week, daily monitoring, and treatment in Atlanta.

After his release from jail, Rossi and his wife hosted a free Thanksgiving dinner for the homeless at the Ranch House in Pittsburgh's North Park. Rossi paid for buses to transport urban children out of high-crime areas to the park. Most of the buses got to those wanting to come, but one had difficulty getting to the arranged pick-up due to snow. Native Americans danced and helped Rossi serve dinners to disadvantaged children. Some of his fellow inmates Rossi befriended in jail attended to help serve the poor. Rossi filed for bankruptcy in 1996 as a result of his legal problems, and started over in California.

== California ==
After completing his probation, Rossi relocated to Hollywood with his wife and two children in 1997, after a script he wrote garnered interest in Hollywood. He returned to preaching, serving as a pastor and church consultant, and moved into acting and filmmaking to explore his interest in creative and cutting-edge expressions of ministry.

Rossi's first Hollywood role was in the 1998 short film Jesus 2000. In 1998, he appeared on stage in his own adaptation of Elmer Gantry, which he wrote, produced and starred. His stage performance resulted in an offer to Rossi to play the role in a new film version.

He started "Eternal Grace", a movement of Hollywood house churches for actors and celebrities who had difficulty attending public services due to paparazzi, and also for AIDS victims and others not welcome to attend other churches. He was protested by followers of Fred Phelps from Westboro Baptist Church of Topeka, Kansas, who decried his lenient attitude toward homosexuals. Rossi's wife Sherrie worked with puppets in their children's ministry.

In 2001, Rossi wrote and directed Saving Sister Aimee, a short documentary film about 1920s evangelist Aimee McPherson. Though some considered it a sensationalized depiction, it won the Angel Award from the Southern California Motion Picture Council for best documentary.

In 2005, Rossi revisited Sister Aimee's story in the low-budget feature biographical film Sister Aimee: The Aimee Semple McPherson Story, (aka Aimee Semple McPherson), featuring Mimi Michaels in the lead and Rance Howard as the preacher's father. It attracted a record crowd to Hollywood's New Beverly Cinema, a revival house specializing in independent and cult films owned by Quentin Tarantino. A group of Evangelicals offered to invest $2 million in the film, but with conditions that the movie did not depict McPherson's divorce or drug overdose and that the actor playing the lead be a Pentecostal Christian. Rossi turned them down. "By saying no to conditions that religious people put on me, I feel I'm actually of more service to God and people because I make an honest film," he said. In addition to his film work, Rossi acted on stage in plays and musicals to positive reviews, remaining active in the Los Angeles theater community.

== Clemente film ==
Between acting jobs that included small roles on TV shows, and several movies, Rossi began working on Baseball's Last Hero: 21 Clemente Stories, a film about his childhood hero, baseball great Roberto Clemente, planning a "bicoastal" return to Pittsburgh to premiere his film on Roberto Clemente's birthday, August 18, 2013 before exhibiting the film in New York, Los Angeles, San Francisco, other cities, small art theaters, Roberto Clemente High School in Chicago, the Wild Goose Festival in North Carolina, and on DVD. The feature film was a labor of love for Rossi and the cadre of actors and technicians who volunteered their time and donated their services to the project. Olympian Jamie Nieto starred as Roberto Clemente. Rossi's telling of Clemente's story of commitment, loyalty, and devotion attempts to provide a counterpoint to today's baseball culture of players suspected of steroid abuse. The dramatic fulcrum of Baseball's Last Hero is a conversation Clemente has with a nun. "She talks to him about the cross. 'Greater love has no man than to lay down his life for his friends,' is what the nun quotes to him from Scripture, talking about sacrificial love and Christ's sacrificial love," Rossi said. "This is the theme I wanted to point out – an allegory of Christ on the cross." Rossi was pressured to delete the scene from the movie for being "too preachy and too Catholic."

The controversial scene turned out to be one of the most popular scenes in the film and won over fans to the idea of pitching for Clemente's canonization as a saint in the Catholic Church.

Rossi says he has received support for his efforts to canonize Clemente from various people. "I've never thought of him in terms of being a saint", said MLB second baseman Neil Walker, a devout Catholic whose father knew Clemente. "But he's somebody who lived his life serving others, really. So if it would happen, I wouldn't be terribly surprised by it."

Some claim the canonization church requirement of a miracle was met on July 22, 2017, when Jaime Nieto, who was paralyzed from the neck down in a backflip accident three years after the Clemente film was released, walked 130 steps at his own wedding to fellow Olympian Shevon Stoddart. The miracle was predicted by Rossi as a demonstration of the power of God in a letter he wrote to Pope Francis. Nieto stated that the success was due to his hard work, and the Holy See stated that they were not in continued contact with Rossi.

== Recent news ==
=== 2014–2015 ===
On November 28, 2014, Rossi was in the news again regarding the controversy over the shooting of Michael Brown. Rossi wrote and recorded a protest song expressing his feelings about a grand jury's decision not to charge a white police officer in the death of the unarmed black teen in Ferguson, Missouri. "I wrote the song in five minutes as a way to express my emotions about the danger of trigger-happy police," Rossi said. "I filmed it on my laptop at my kitchen table and uploaded it to YouTube." Rossi uploaded the video on November 26, and provided the song's lyrics in the video description. Here is a sample from the song's beginning, printed in the Los Angeles Daily News: "Down at the courthouse on a Monday afternoon/Justice was thrown right out the window when a young white cop entered the room."

Rossi continues to host his talk-show "Richard Rossi Live" as a podcast distributed by Castbox FM Broadcasting. In 2015, the format of the program changed from its Christian roots on WPIT, a Salem Radio Network station, by broadening its content for a general audience. Although Rossi still on occasion discusses religion, the program's focus is on known artists, writers, and celebrity guests.

Following the positive Pittsburgh reception to Rossi's Roberto Clemente project, Rossi said they were coming home, living "bicoastal," maintaining homes in Hollywood and Pittsburgh. "We'd like to spend more time in our home, where most of our family and friends live, in the North Hills of Pittsburgh," Rossi said.

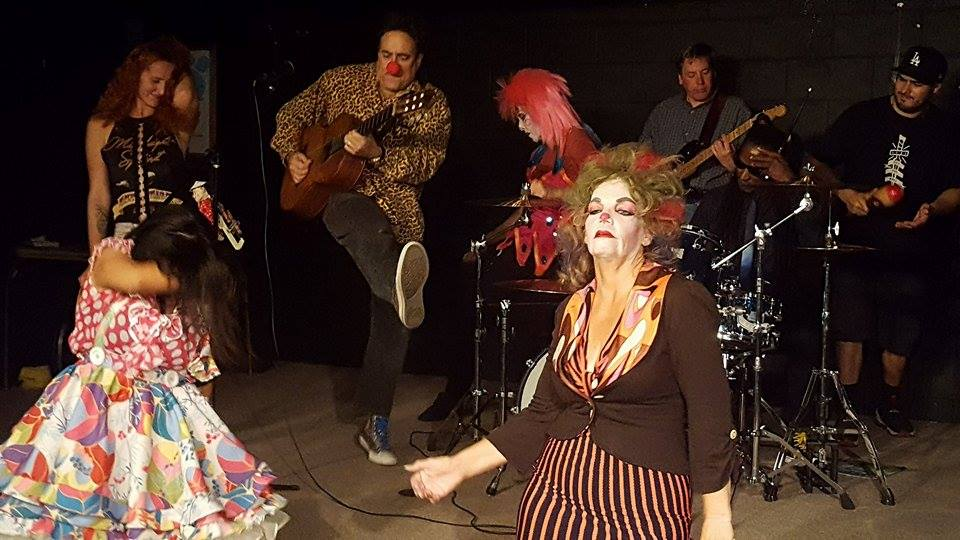
Richard Rossi playing guitar in the film Canaan Land with D.H. Peligro on drums. (April 17, 2017)

=== 2016–Present ===
In March, 2016, it was reported that Rossi was in pre-production on his film Canaan Land. Rebecca Holden played Sister Sara Sunday.

On September 30, 2017, CBS KCAL-TV channel 9 news reported on Rossi's founding of the support group Families Fighting Fentanyl to combat the fentanyl epidemic, to help addicts, work with law enforcement to hold drug dealers accountable, and support grieving families who lost a loved one to fentanyl. Rossi discussed the 2017 death of his youngest brother due to an overdose of heroin laced with fentanyl.

On January 31, 2018, Rossi and his family, in tandem with Pittsburgh Police, offered a cash reward for information leading to the arrest of the individual(s) who gave his brother the fatal fentanyl dose.

In May 2019, Rossi and other actors performed monologues based on interviews with homeless people as part of Homeward L.A., an effort to raise money for the Midnight Mission, a Los Angeles skid row shelter.

Rossi has also co-written a children's book Lucy and the Lake Monster, with retired fourth grade school teacher Kelly Tabor. It tells the story of a 9-year-old orphan girl and her grandfather searching for Champ, the legendary sea serpent of Lake Champlain. The book became a family film, directed by Rossi, beginning post-production in May, 2023, and finishing post-production and premiering in 2024. As of 2025, the film has garnered multiple awards on the film festival circuit.

On June 20, 2026, Rossi graduated with an MFA degree in screenwriting from the David Lynch Graduate School of Cinematic Arts. Rossi was in the last graduating class to be personally mentored by David Lynch before he passed.

== Alleged Evidence for Champ Legend ==
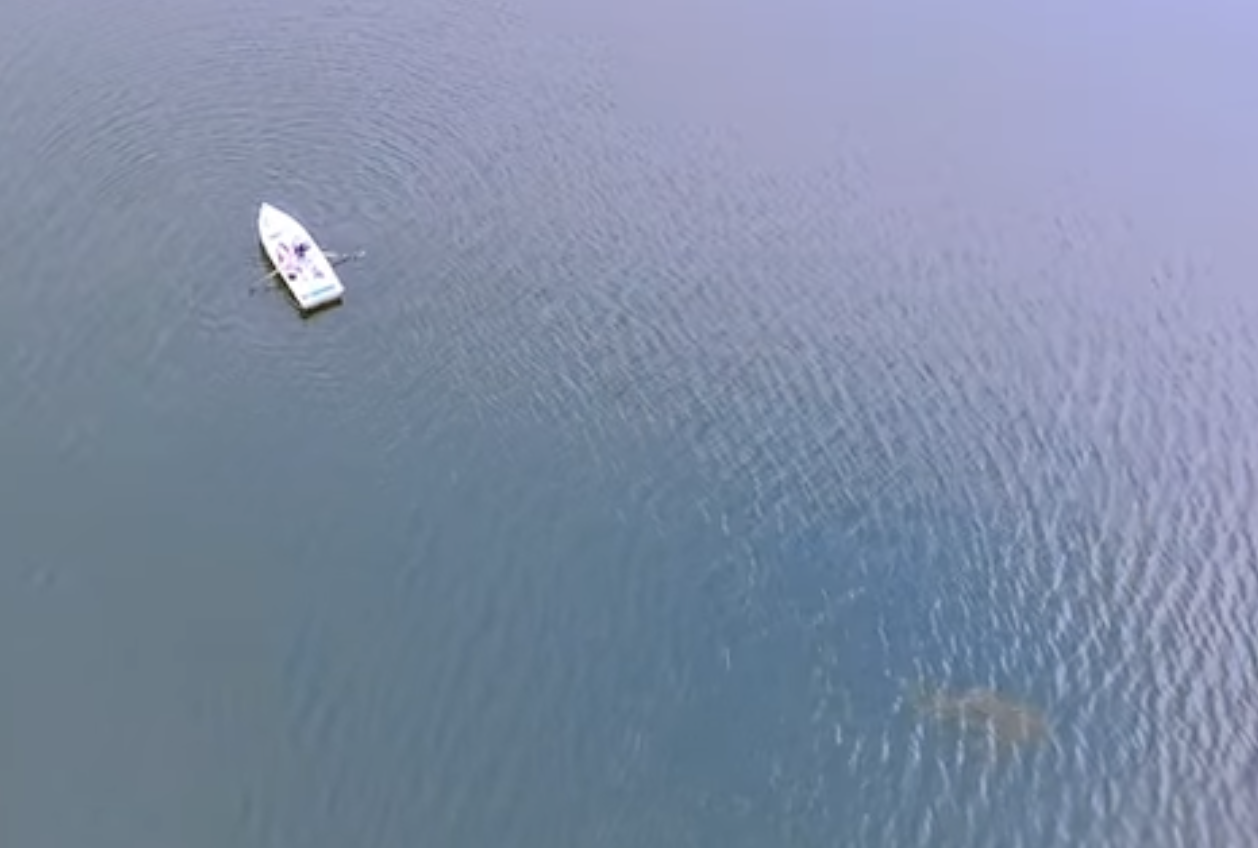
Still shot from 5 minute drone footage of Champ swimming behind boat containing two lead actors in the "Lucy & the Lake Monster" film

During post-production of Rossi's Lucy and the Lake Monster film, his writing partner Kelly Tabor reviewed their drone footage from production on August 2, 2024, and noticed what appeared to be a large creature swimming just below the surface of the water in Bulwagga Bay. The alleged creature is visible in the bottom right portion of the screen, swimming behind a boat on which the two lead actors of the film were aboard. The boat was 142 inches from the tip of the bow to the stern and 50.5 inches at the widest point, and the alleged creature appears to be larger than the boat.

Co-writer Tabor believes it to be a foundational piece of evidence for Champ. Rossi said that he shared the footage with scientists. A ten-second clip from the longer twelve-minute footage was shared publicly on YouTube and went viral worldwide, garnering millions of views.

On October 3, 2025, William Shatner presented the Tabor-Rossi footage on his program The UnXplained, a television series on History. The show had various experts analyze the footage, and the conclusion was that this was corroboration that Champ might be real. (Season 7, Episode 15, "Terrors of the Deep.")

== Filmography ==
=== Film ===
Year	Title	Credit	Role	Notes
1998	Elmer Gantry (TV movie)	Director, Writer, Actor	Elmer Gantry	
2006	Sister Aimee: The Aimee Semple McPherson Story	Director, writer, actor	David Hutton	
2013	Baseball's Last Hero: 21 Clemente Stories	Director, writer, actor	Birddog	
2020	Canaan Land	Director, writer, actor	Brother Billy	Academy Award-considered
2024	Lucy and the Lake Monster	Director, writer, actor	Papa	
