= Canaan Land =

- Theatrical Poster
- Directed by: Richard Rossi
- Written by: Richard Rossi
- Starring: Rebecca Holden; Richard Rossi; Isaac Bar-Jonah; Jozy Pollock; Louis Gossett Jr. Lynda Carter; Cindy Williams; Sally Kirkland; Kathy Garver; Kathy Coleman; Karolyn Grimes; Hilary Momberger; Joseph Gonzalez; Dawna Lee Heising
- Cinematography: Richard Krause; Jeffrey Griffith; Robert Reber; Adan Higgins; Jeff Woolley; Grayson Shapiro
- Edited by: Richard Rossi; Richard Krause
- Music by: Rebecca Holden; Richard Rossi; Joel Diamond; Joshua Rossi
- Distributed by: Amazon; Vimeo; ChristianCinema.com; Tubi; Roku; YouTube
- Release date: November 2020
- Running time: 113 minutes
- Country: USA
- Language: English

Canaan Land is a 2020 American comedy-drama film written and directed by Richard Rossi and starring Richard Rossi as Brother Billy and Rebecca Holden as Sister Sara Sunday. It is based on the novel of the same name by Rossi. Like the novel it was based on, the film generated controversy at the time of its release from evangelical religious groups, who took issue with Rossi exposing fraudulent faith-healing techniques of well-known televangelists.

It is my intention in exposing the counterfeit to show the search for that which is pure, lovely, true. Defensive believers may say we shouldn't expose the counterfeit, but a counterfeit testifies that there is a truth sets us free.

— Richard Rossi, answering evangelicals who claim Canaan Land is an attack on religion.

== Background ==
After playing the lead role in a 1998 Los Angeles play version of the novel Elmer Gantry, Rossi was cast in the lead role of the con man preacher Elmer Gantry in a film remake of the 1960 Academy Award-winning film of the same name, slated to be directed by Amin Q. Chaudhri. Chaudhri sought investors for a $20 million budget. The remake was never made, but Rossi began writing his own story of an Elmer Gantryish evangelist in a contemporary setting.

In March 2016, it was reported that Rossi was in pre-production on his film Canaan Land. Rebecca Holden was cast to play Sister Sara Sunday.

== Plot ==
Billy Gantry is an aging gigolo living in Beverly Hills in the house of his girlfriend, Connie. He makes money giving telephone psychic readings. Connie catches him bedding his clients and kicks him out, leaving Billy homeless. He leaves with just his guitar and the clothes on his back.

Billy heads to the California Institute of Abnormalarts, a North Hollywood nightclub and sideshow. Billy performs a song, singing and playing guitar with the house band. The lyrics describe a street preacher, a persona Billy's therapist says is a manic side of Billy's personality, triggered by stress and loss. As Billy sings, clowns from the freak show dance. Billy asks patrons of the nightclub to put him up for the night, but they refuse, knowing him to be a petty hustler. Finally, Billy spots Pary, a woman who he performed psychic readings for earlier, and she invites him back to her place. He talks her into lending him her red Jeep Cherokee and clothes from her late husband.

Billy, a former preacher, listens to the YouTube sermons of Sister Sara Sunday, a sincere evangelist with a small church. Billy charms his way into her life and ministry. Brother Billy and Sister Sara become tag-team preachers and romantic partners.

When Sara has to temporarily leave the church to care for her aging spiritual mother and mentor, ("Mother Grace"), Billy takes over. He builds the church with fake miracles, including a staged resurrection, and gold glitter he claims is from the golden streets of Heaven. He is aided by his friends Rocco (a seedy private eye), Laz (a Compton, California street kid), and Laz's father. Billy's broadcasts on radio and TV include cameos by Hollywood stars. Billy preaches at the Hollywood Bowl.

At the peak of his popularity, Billy is investigated by student reporters from a skepticism magazine. They collaborate with a group of Me Too movement women who reveal how Billy conned them in the past to get sex and money. Their videotaped testimonies are organized by Billy's Beverly Hills ex-girlfriend Connie and Psychic Insight (his former boss at the psychic network). The scandal devastates Sara. She throws Billy out of the church and breaks up with him.

After the breakup, Sara focuses on her ministry, preaching, singing at large Christian gatherings, and riding down Hollywood Boulevard as the queen of the Hollywood Christmas Parade.

Billy is homeless once again, and more depressed. He jaywalks in a tunnel with semi-trailer trucks and stretches out his hands in a death wish, imitating Christ on the cross. He visits a chapel and confesses he doesn't believe in God because a pastor abused him when he was a boy. Billy picks up a young prostitute named Angel who turns out to be his daughter whom he abandoned years ago. She asks him to give faith one last chance.

Billy asks for a Christmas miracle to restore his faith. He sincerely changes and wants to demonstrate his repentance by his actions. He gives money back to the poor he conned into giving him "love offerings," assisted by Laz. He returns Pary's red Jeep and gives her money to pay for driving her Jeep so long. He visits an orphanage and prays for a little girl in a wheelchair but makes sure all cellphone cameras are off. The girl experiences a miraculous recovery but Billy refuses to exploit it.

Billy dresses in white as a sign of purity and repentance and joins others from Sara's church at the Santa Monica beach. Sara recognizes Billy is changing and forgives him, but is unwilling to reunite with him romantically. She gives him her Bible and encourages him to stay on the right path. Sara tearfully watches him walk away at the Santa Monica Pier and prays for Billy.

== Cast ==
- Richard Rossi as Brother Billy
- Rebecca Holden as Sister Sara
- Hilary Momberger as Professor Cathy
- Lynda Carter as Walk of Fame Star recipient
- Cindy Williams as talk show guest
- Sally Kirkland as talk show guest
- Louis Gossett Jr. as talk show guest
- Kathy Garver as talk show guest
- Kathy Coleman as talk show guest
- Karolyn Grimes as talk show guest
- Ginger Alden as talk show guest
- Dawna Lee Heising as Connie
- Isaac Bar-Jonah as Laz
- Umoja Butler as Laz's father L.C.
- Jozy Pollock as Mother Grace
- Joseph Gonzalez as Rocco
- Alex Rinehart as Angel
- Remiara Eve as Investigative Reporter
- Adrian Ian as Investigative Reporter
- Rosetta Walker as Sister Angela
- Philip Bell as Brother David
- Mila Perkins as Pary
- Maryann Rachford as Sister Emma
- Thom Rachford as Brother Tony
- Silvia Spross as Psychic Insight
- Mary Amerson as Psychic Destiny
- Martin Ross as Billy's therapist Dr. Corrado

This was the final film performance of Cindy Williams before her death in 2023. This film also marks Karolyn Grimes' first film role in 68 years.

Director Richard Rossi receives acting award on behalf of Rebecca Holden at the theatrical premiere of Canaan Land at the Marina Del Rey Film Festival from festival directors Peter Greene and Jon Gursha. (July, 2021)

== Release ==
The film was released in drive-in screenings rather than traditional theaters due to the COVID-19 pandemic to qualify for the Academy Awards, and on VOD (Video on demand) on January 5, 2021.

== Reception ==
Alan Ng of Film Threat gave the film a 6 out of 10. Its West Coast theatrical premiere was a screening at the Marina Del Rey Film Festival, where Rebecca Holden won the Best Supporting Actress award. Its East Coast theatrical premiere was at the Great Lakes Christian Film Festival in New York, where Canaan Land won an award for the "Most Creative Feature Film," and Richard Rossi was nominated for Best Actor in a Narrative Feature Film.
