= WPIT =

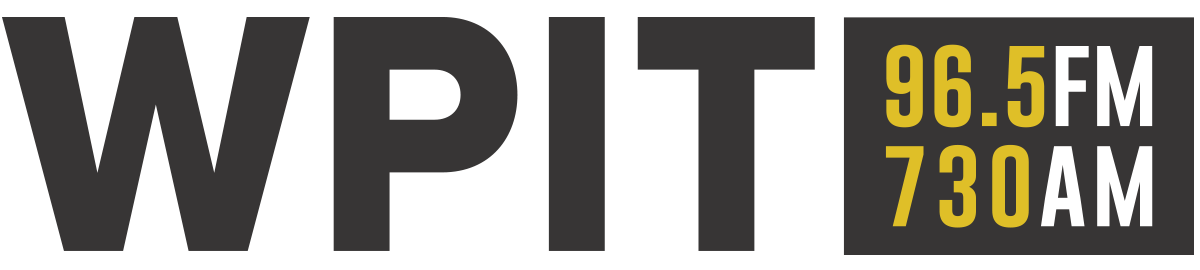

Pittsburgh, Pennsylvania; United States
- Broadcast area: Pittsburgh metropolitan area
- Frequency: 730 kHz
- Branding: WPIT 96.5 FM / 730 AM

Programming
- Language: English
- Format: Christian radio (days); Classic Christian contemporary music (nights)
- Affiliations: SRN News; Townhall

Ownership
- Owner: Salem Media Group; (Salem Communications Holding Corporation)
- Sister stations: WORD-FM; WPGP

History
- First air date: 1947
- Call sign meaning: Pittsburgh

Technical information
- Licensing authority: FCC
- Facility ID: 58624
- Class: D
- Power: 5,000 watts day 24 watts night
- Transmitter coordinates: 40°29′02″N 79°59′34″W
- Translator: 96.5 W243BW (Pittsburgh)

Links
- Public license information: Public file; LMS
- Webcast: Listen live Listen live (via Audacy)
- Website: www.wpitam.com

WPIT (730 AM) is a commercial radio station in Pittsburgh, Pennsylvania. It carries a Christian talk and teaching radio format. At night, classic Christian contemporary music is heard. WPIT is licensed to the Salem Communications Holding Corporation, which is owned by the Salem Media Group. The studios are at Parkway Center in Pittsburgh.

By day, WPIT is powered at 5,000 watts; because 730 AM is a Canadian and Mexican clear channel frequency WPIT must reduce power to only 24 watts at night, to avoid interference. The transmitter is off Mount Troy Road in Pittsburgh. The station's antenna system uses a single tower that results in an omnidirectional signal pattern. According to the Antenna Structure Registration database, the tower is 99 m (325 ft) tall. Programming is also heard on 250 watt FM translator W243CW at 96.5 MHz.

== Programming ==
WPIT carries both local and national religious leaders, including Adrian Rogers, David Jeremiah, Alistair Begg and Chuck Swindoll. It uses brokered programming where hosts pay for time on the station and may use their shows to seek donations to their ministries. World and national news is supplied by SRN News. The station is the Pittsburgh affiliate for Penn State Nittany Lions football.

From 6:30 p.m. to 6 a.m., WPIT switches to a Christian contemporary music format. WPIT is one of two Christian radio stations owned by Salem in Pittsburgh. Sister station 101.5 WORD-FM carries Christian talk and teaching programs around the clock.

== History ==
Original WPIT logo.

WPIT signed on the air in 1947. It has been a Christian radio station for most of its history and at one time was a simulcast of its FM sister station, 101.5 WORD-FM.

WPIT's studios were once located on Smithfield Street in downtown Pittsburgh. A neon sign reading "WPIT DIAL 730" hung outside their former location for years after they had moved out, well into the early 1980s. The station moved to Gateway Towers in downtown Pittsburgh around 1980, next door to the KDKA and KDKA-TV home of One Gateway Center.

In September 1991, Richard Rossi began broadcasting his nightly radio show Rich Rossi Live on Pittsburgh's WPIT-FM. The program created controversy when Rossi challenged the sale of WPIT to Salem, calling Christian radio and other evangelical churches "whores" who sell out the gospel for money.

WPIT has had only three managers in its long history. Michael Komichak, who also built the station back in 1947 and did much of its engineering work, Chuck Gratner, who assumed control of WPIT-AM and FM after both were sold to Salem in 1993, and then-sales manager Tom Lemmon, who became General Manager following Gratner's retirement in 2014.

After Salem's takeover, old policies against atheist guests were lifted and Richard Dawkins has even appeared on air. Once the sale to Salem was complete, the operations of WPIT and WORD-FM moved up to Seven Parkway Center in Greentree, just outside the Pittsburgh city limits.

WPIT had some secular conservative talk programming in its lineup (Dr. Laura, Michael Medved, and Hugh Hewitt), but religious programming continues to fill most of the station's hours. For many years, WPIT has also aired foreign-language and ethnic programming on weekends.

The station is known as "73 WPIT"
