= Altamaha-ha =

Legendary creature in folklore from Georgia, US

Creature information
- Other name: Altie
- Grouping: River monster
- Similar entities: Loch Ness Monster, Ogopogo, Champ, Nahuelito

Origin
- Country: United States
- Region: Georgia
- Details: Aquatic

In Georgia folklore, the Altamaha-ha (or Altie) is a legendary creature, alleged to inhabit the myriad small streams and abandoned rice fields near the mouth of the Altamaha River (after which it is named) in southeastern Georgia. Sightings are particularly reported around Darien and elsewhere in McIntosh County.

According to The Brunswick News, the legend has its roots in Muscogee tradition. An alligator gar has been proposed as being a possible identity for recent sightings attributed to the creature.

In 2018, decomposing remains were found on a beach in the Wolf Island National Wildlife Refuge, causing speculation that it may be the body of an Altamaha-ha. Performance artist Zardulu later claimed responsibility for the remains, which were created out of a stuffed shark and papier-mâché.

Paleoartist, Rick Spears, created a sculpture of Altamaha-ha, which is on display at the Darien-McIntosh County Visitor Center in Darien, Georgia.

== In popular culture ==
In the videogame South of Midnight, Altamaha-ha is featured as a boss that Hazel encounters in a dark swamp. It is depicted as a large feminine siren-like creature. In her backstory, Altamaha-ha was once a slave woman named Ayotunde who worked at a paddle boat and mothered a baby named Honey. Eventually she jumped out of the boat with her child and escaped from her captors by hiding in the swamp, but in the process lost her baby. Ayotunde searched endlessly for Honey until the magic of the swamp transformed her into a fish-like monster, where she killed the paddle boat's crew and continued searching for her baby. Meanwhile, Honey also became a monster when Ayotunde hides him in an old tree, turning into a gentle golem that Hazel befriended and helped him reunite with his mother.
