= Sister Aimee: The Aimee Semple McPherson Story =

2006 film by Richard Rossi

- DVD Cover
- Directed by: Richard Rossi
- Written by: Richard Rossi
- Produced by: Frank Carvajal; Connie Fleishauer
- Starring: Mimi Michaels; Rance Howard; Carl Ballantine; Kiera Chaplin; Teres Byrne
- Edited by: Adam Lightplay; Jaime Prater
- Music by: Richard Rossi; Nita Sinaga
- Distributed by: Amazon; Vimeo; Tubi; Roku; YouTube
- Release date: January 2006
- Running time: 110 minutes
- Country: United States

Sister Aimee: The Aimee Semple McPherson Story (working title: Aimee Semple McPherson) is a 2006 feature-length dramatic biographical film about evangelist "Sister" Aimee Semple McPherson.

== Production ==
The cast includes Mimi Michaels, Rance Howard, Carl Ballantine and Kiera Chaplin. Richard Rossi wrote, directed and also acted in the film. Rossi shot the film with a $300 consumer camcorder. The movie has a jittery, sepia-toned 1920s motif, employing silent film cards and a period look with a contemporary documentary style.

The film was made under a low-budget agreement with the Screen Actor's Guild for experimental films with budgets under $75,000. It had a screening at SAG headquarters in the James Cagney theater as part of that year's SAG Conversations. SAG Conversations showcased the film with a discussion including the filmmaker, some cast and crew along with the panel taking questions from the audience of SAG members. It also attracted a record crowd to Hollywood's New Beverly Cinema.

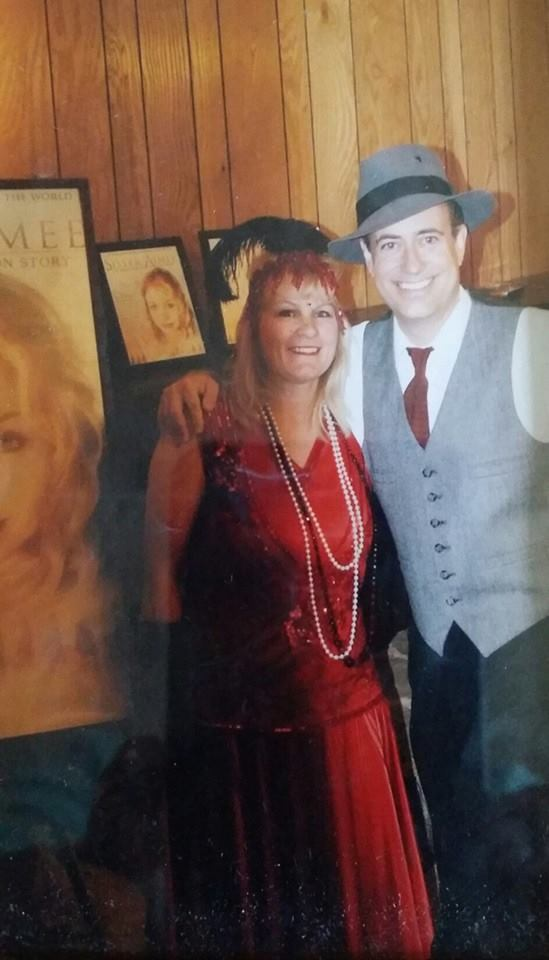
The film's writer-director Richard Rossi, and his wife Sherrie in 1920s attire at a Los Angeles screening in April 2008

Rossi admitted telling his own story allegorically through telling Sister Aimee's. In November 2001, Rossi, a healing evangelist, received restoration treatment for depression and healing from childhood abuse at Healing for the Nations ministry in Atlanta, Georgia. "I was trying to help everybody else, but I was feeling empty inside," Rossi said. "It was like I was trying to fix the whole world, but I couldn't fix myself. It was a pretty lonely feeling."

== Critical response ==
Critical reception was mixed. Christianity Today said the film "goes much deeper" than previous portrayals of McPherson, including The Disappearance of Aimee (a 1970s television movie starring Faye Dunaway) and Rossi's 37-minute 2001 documentary film Saving Sister Aimee. The magazine gave the movie 2 stars out of 4 and said "Rossi gives insight into the emotional dysfunction arising from Pentecostalism's adulation of flawed and charismatic leaders...the film veers into psychohistory and reflects the psyche of the writer/director." Film Threat's reviewer stated "'McPherson' is a dreadful self-defeating melodrama." and MovieGuide's review said "The script is the best part of the movie, since it was filmed on a low budget and the acting is sometimes foolish. In spite of the technical flaws, this movie is very compelling."

It was released on DVD on April 22, 2008, and on Amazon Prime, Tubi, Vimeo, and YouTube.

== See also ==
- Aimee Semple McPherson
