= Rebecca Holden =

American actress, model, and singer

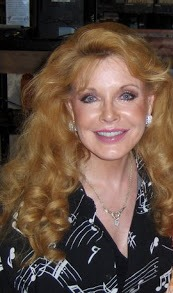
- Rebecca Holden in 2009
- Born: June 12, 1958 (age 68); Dallas, Texas, U.S.
- Occupations: Actress; model; singer
- Years active: 1980–present
- Known for: Knight Rider; General Hospital
- Spouses: Bobby Vassallo (m. 1980; div. 1986) Joel Diamond (m. 2015; div. 2023)
- Website: www.rebeccaholden.com

Rebecca Holden is an American actress, model, and singer. She is known for playing April Curtis in the second season of the NBC series Knight Rider. She has recorded country and gospel music for labels including Curb Records and BMG.

== Early life ==
Holden studied voice and piano in New York City, where she began working as a model.

== Career ==
=== Modeling ===
Holden became known in advertising as “the Breck Girl”. She also appeared on magazine covers and in national commercials for brands including Ivory Soap, Dentyne, Kellogg's, Chevrolet, Gillette, Playtex, Arrid, and 7 Up.

=== Acting ===
Holden made guest-appearances on primetime including The Love Boat; Magnum, P.I.; Matt Houston; Three's Company; Taxi; Night Court; Mike Hammer; Remington Steele; Barney Miller; Quincy, M.E.; T.J. Hooker; and Police Squad!. In 1983, she joined the cast of the TV series Knight Rider for its second season as April Curtis. Later in 1987, she played Elena Cosgrove on the ABC's soap opera General Hospital

She later moved to Tennessee to help care for her an ill sister. During this period, she appeared in stage productions including Oliver! and Damn Yankees, and starred in a production of Baby, the Musical at the Boiler Room Theatre in Franklin, Tennessee role of Nancy in Oliver! and Lola in Damn Yankees. Holden starred in a production of Baby, the Musical at the Boiler Room Theatre in Franklin, Tennessee. In May 1993, she began co-hosting the TNN dance series Dancin' at the Hot Spots with James Hill.

In 2009, Holden played Beth in the movie adaptation of The Book of Ruth: Journey of Faith. She also played a gospel singer in the 2020 film Canaan Land and later received the Best Supporting Actress award for a feature film at the 2021 Marina del Rey Film Festival. In 2024, she appeared in the independent western film Was Once a Hero with Darby Hinton and John Carter Cash, and Robert Carradine.

=== Music ===
While still working as a model, Holden formed a country music group and toured with it for two years. In January 1987, she made her Las Vegas debut at the Landmark Hotel and also appeared at the Eastern State Exposition later that year.

In 1989, Holden signed with TRA-Star Records and placed two singles on the Billboard country chart titled "The Truth Doesn't Always Rhyme" which peaked at number 82m and "License to Steal", which peaked at number 78. In the same year, she was recognized as both New Independent Artist and New Independent Female Vocalist of the Year at the first Cash Box magazine Nashville Music Awards.

In March 1992 Holden performed with her band at Farm Aid V, held at Texas Stadium in Irving, Texas. She recorded the album The Highway Runs Both Ways for Curb Records; the title track was promoted to country radio in September 1992, and its music video was placed in rotation on CMT and TNN that year. Robert K. Oermann reviewed the single in MusicRow. She continued to tour in 1994 and performed at the Ryman Auditorium in 1996.

She also recorded a self-titled country album for BMG Europe and gospel album, The Freedom to Belive, for BMG Group in Switzerland. In the early 2010s, Holden toured with Kevin Sasaki in "Together Forever", a musical tribute to Eydie Gormé and Steve Lawrence.

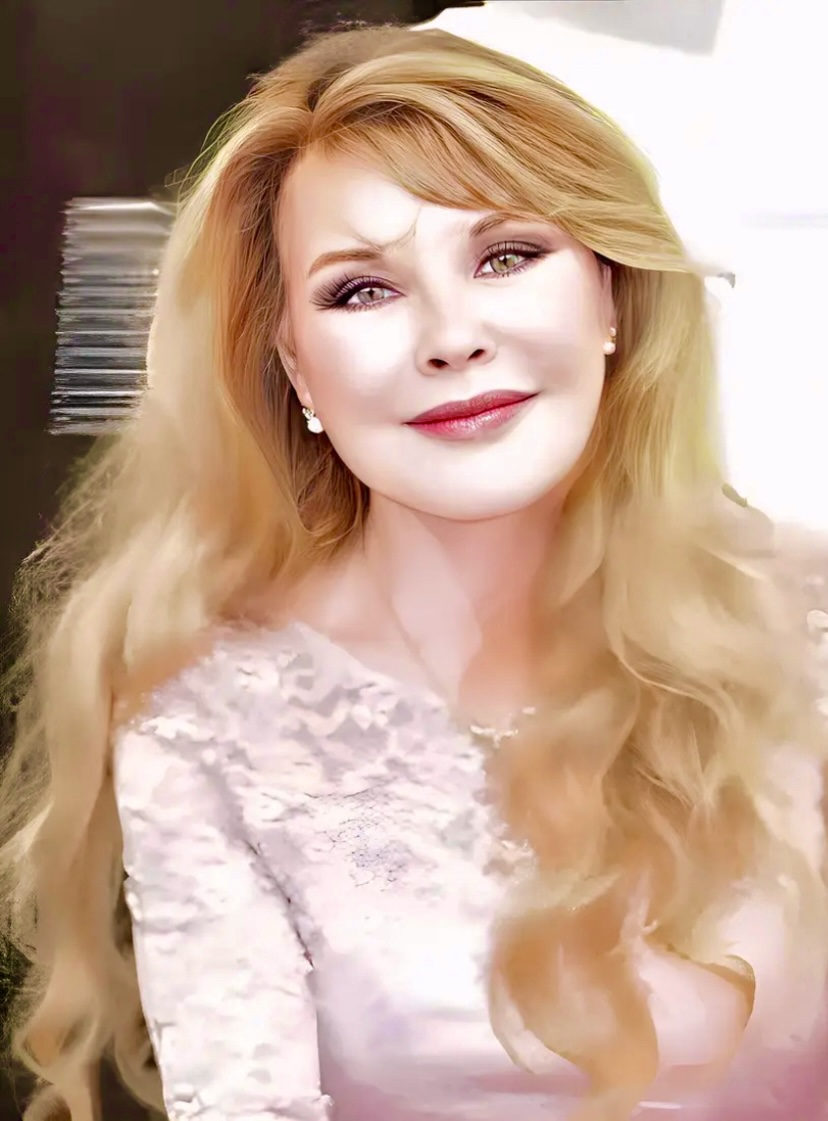
Holden in 2024

== Personal life ==
Holden was married to Bobby Vasselo from 1980 until their divorce in 1986. She later married the record producer Joel Diamond on New Year's Eve 2014.

She was a founding board member of Operation California, now Operation USA, traveled to Ethiopia for relief work during the famine there; she later helped form Operation Texas, which assisted earthquake victims in Mexico City. In 1991, became the spokesperson for the Save The Ocean Project, and later took part in relief efforts after the Los Angeles earthquake in 1994. She has also served as president of the Music City Christian Fellowship. In 2022, Rebecca was named a board of director and the Ambassador of Goodwill for The Stars Foundation. She is a board member of the William Stephanie Foundation.

== Filmography ==
Film
Year	Film	Role	Notes
1982	The Last Hero	Christene Adams	Alternative title: Yogoreta eiyû
1988	The Sisterhood	Alee	Caged Woman
1989	Loverboy	Anchovy woman	
1991	Twenty Dollar Star	Lisa	
1992	The Hollywood Beach Murders	Jamie	
1999	Foolish	Rebecca the Waitress	
1999	Lycanthrope	Sheila Stein	Alternative title: Bloody Moon
2001	Knight Chills	Newscaster	Direct-to-video release
2001	Outlaw Prophet	Molly	
2005	From Venus	The Avatrix	
2009	The Book of Ruth: Journey of Faith	Beth	Direct-to-video release
2015	The Hollywouldn'ts	Gloria	
2016	All Wrong	Gabriella	
2021	Canaan Land	Lead	
2024	Was Once a Hero	Millie	
Television
Year	Title	Role	Notes
1980	B.A.D. Cats		1 episode
1980	Three's Company	Bunny/Twinkie	1 episode
1981-84	The Love Boat	Mona (1981), Diane (1984)	2 episodes
1981	Magnum, P.I.,	Laura Frasier	1 episode
	Barney Miller, 1981	Wendy McWilliams	1 episode: "Paternity"
1982	House Calls	Jan Howard	1 episode
1982	Happy Days	Lola	1 episode
1982	Enos		1 episode
1982	Taxi	Christina Longworth	1 episode
1982	Private Benjamin		1 episode
1982	Too Close for Comfort	Susan Andrews	1 episode
1982	Quincy, M.E.	Kirsten MacKenzie	1 episode
1982	Police Squad!	Stella	1 episode
1982	T. J. Hooker	Lynn Hartman	1 episode
1983	Johnny Blue	Kathy Weatherby	Television movie
1983	Matt Houston	Dr. Carol Masters; Sharon Dardis	2 episodes
1983–1984	Knight Rider	April Curtis	21 episodes
1984	The Master	Laura Crane	1 episode
1984	The New Mike Hammer	Barbara Rainey	1 episode
1986	Night Court	Mary Korchak	1 episode
1986	Remington Steele	Windsor Thomas	1 episode
1987	General Hospital	Elena Cosgrove	Unknown episodes
1988	CBS Summer Playhouse	Vanessa	1 episode
1993	Dancin’ at the Hot Spots	Co-host	TNN; from May 1, 1993
2017	Baskets	Marissa	Episode: “Yard Sale”
2020	Saved by the Bell	Senior Girl	Episode: “The Fabulous Birchwood Boys”

== Discography ==
=== Albums ===
Title	Label	Notes
The Highway Runs Both Ways	Curb Records	Country album
Rebecca Holden	BMG Europe	Country album
The Freedom to Believe	BMG (Switzerland)	Country album

=== Singles ===
Year	Title	Peak chart positions US Country	Label
1989	"The Truth Doesn't Always Rhyme"	82	Tra-Star
1989	"License to Steal"	78	Tra-Star
