= Gareth Higgins =

Gareth Higgins is a writer from Belfast, Northern Ireland now living in Asheville, North Carolina. He is the founding director of the Wild Goose Festival. He also co-founded the North Carolina Film Critics Association and the Porch Community.

He is a graduate in sociology from Queen's University of Belfast (BA, PhD); his thesis looked at religion and conflict in Northern Ireland and the USA. He was a co-founder (in 1998) of the zero28 Project, a faith-based peace and justice initiative in Northern Ireland. He has written and spoken widely on religion and conflict, art and spirituality and film, with his work appearing in The Independent, The Irish Times, Sojourners, and Third Way Magazine, among others.

He appears regularly on BBC Radio, and he and Jett Loe co-present a film review podcast called 'The Film Talk'.

== Personal life ==
He is married to Brian Ammons, who is a Baptist chaplain.

== Selected publications ==
Anti-Catholicism in Northern Ireland, co-authored with John D. Brewer (Palgrave, 1998)

How Movies Helped Save My Soul: Finding Spiritual Fingerprints in Culturally Significant Films (Relevant Books, 2003)

Chapter in: Artisans of Peace: Grassroots Peacemaking Among Christian Communities (Orbis, 2003)

Chapter in: Researching the Troubles: Social Science Perspectives on the Northern Ireland Conflict (Mainstream, 2004)

Article on 'Free Presbyterianism' in The Encyclopaedia of Ireland (Gill & Macmillan, 2004)

Religion, Civil Society, and Peace in Northern Ireland, co-authored by John D. Brewer and Francis Teeney (Oxford University Press, 2011)

Cinematic States (Burnside Books, 2013)

How Not to Be Afraid: Seven Ways to Live When Everything Seems Terrifying (Canterbury Press Norwich, 2021)

A Whole Life in Twelve Movies (with Kathleen Norris) (2024)
