= Labynkyr =

Lake in Oymyakonsky Ulus, Sakha Republic, Russia

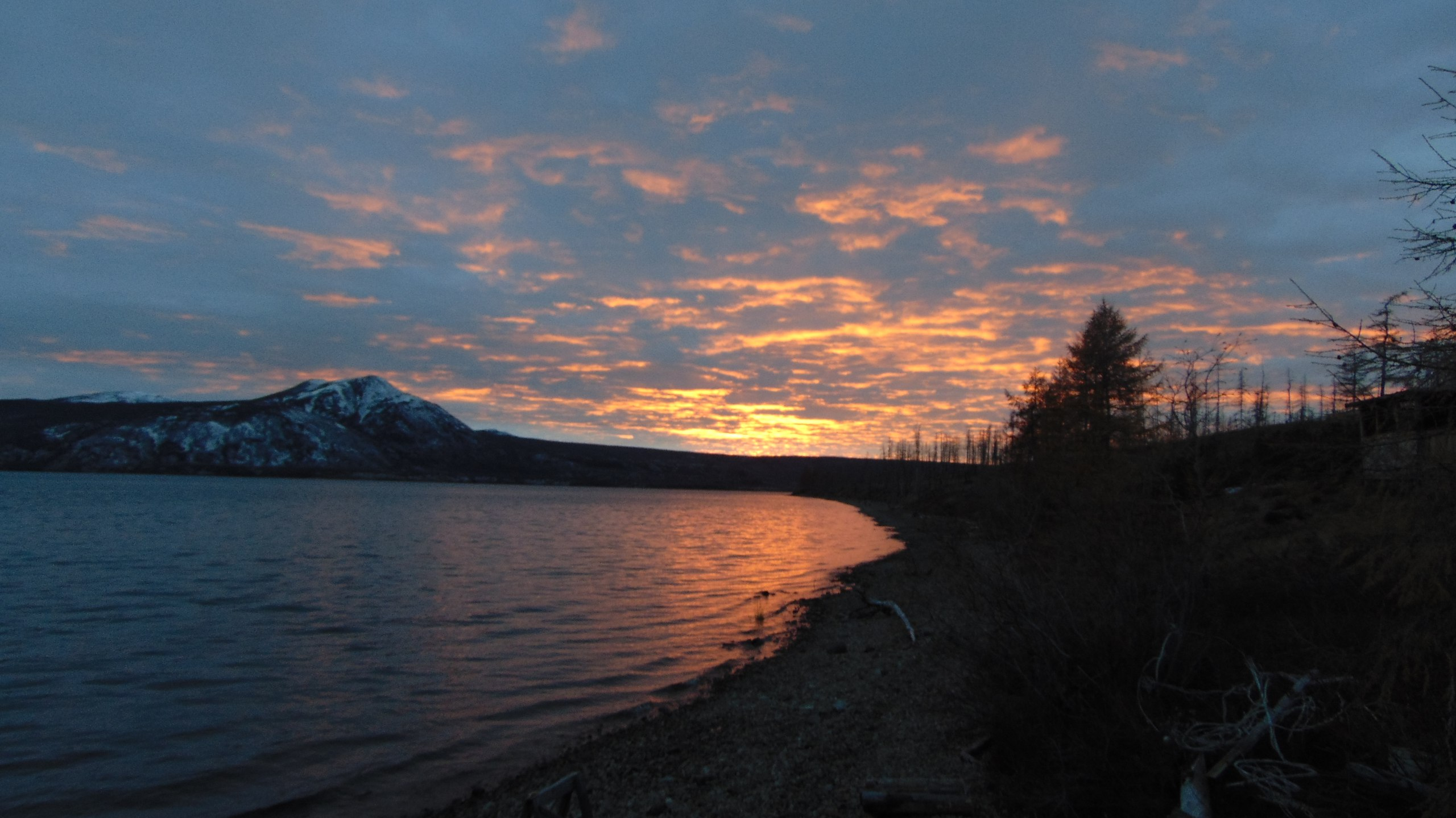
- View of the lake

- Location in the Sakha Republic, Russia
- Interactive map of Labynkyr
- Location: Sordonokh Plateau
- Coordinates: 62.49710°N 143.60687°E
- Basin countries: Russia
- Max. length: 14.3 km (9 mi)
- Max. width: 4.1 km (3 mi)
- Surface area: 44.7 km^{2} (17.3 sq mi)
- Average depth: 52 m (171 ft)
- Max. depth: 75 m (246 ft)
- Surface elevation: 1,020 m (3,346 ft)
- Frozen: October–June

Labynkyr (Russian: Лабынкыр, Yakut: Лабыҥкыр, romanized: Labıñkır) is a lake in Oymyakonsky Ulus, Sakha Republic, Russia. The lake is part of the Indigirka basin and is located near the borders of Khabarovsk Krai and Magadan Oblast. The surface area of the lake is 44.7 km^{2} (17.3 sq mi) and is 1020 meters above mean sea level. Its average depth is 52 m (171 ft). The highest summer temperature at the end of July can reach 35°C, the coldest winter temperature can fall to -65°C and colder, the most often it below colder -60 since December ended four February started, amplitude during a year several years can rise 100° and higher.

Labynkyr is unusual as it does not freeze solid during the winter as other lakes in the region do. It maintains a 2 degrees Celsius (36 Fahrenheit) water temperature which causes scientists to speculate that there may be an underground hot spring or fissure heating the lake. Surface air temperatures at their lowest have been recorded at negative 60 degrees Celsius (negative 76 Fahrenheit). There is an 80 meters (260 feet) deep underwater trench that divers have not by 2013 been able to explore. There is also a suspicion by scientists that Labynkyr connects by underground tunnel to lake Vorota, 20 km (12 mi) away. One reason this is suspected is because both lakes are at the same water levels. Folklore and eyewitness accounts speculate that a lake monster called the Labynkyr Devil or Labynkyrsky Chert lives there.

== Research ==
In March 2013, the Russian Geographic Society and the Diving Sport Federation of Russia put together a scientific expedition with the goal to take water and soil samples from various parts of the lake to compare with samples taken from lake Vorota. Secondary, the team wanted to "study the human body activity and diving equipment in extreme weather conditions". They shared their results with the Mars-500 project, which was a 500-day simulation to prepare for a possible trip to the planet Mars. Scientists were also interested in understanding what food exists in the winter for the few fish and other organisms that do live in the lake as there were few observable plants under the frozen surface.

Divers Dmitry Shiller and Alexander Gubin set a world record for the "deepest-ever dive under ice in the world" with a depth of 59.6 m (196 ft). The expedition drove out to the lake using specially modified KAMAZ trucks for the drive across the ice, according to KAMAZ employee Anzhelika Akueva, it took about 20 hours to drive 30 km (19 mi). Tents were set up on the ice allowing for some protection from the wind for the photographers and rest of the team assisting the divers. Various places on the lake were chosen for dives, and one was a night time dive, they "'did about 200 different measurements and took about 20 samples'". The biggest creatures the divers encountered were dogfish which were a bit bigger than normal at about 1.2 m (3 ft 11 in) long. According to Live Science, Voice of Russia reported that the team discovered a large jawbone and skeleton using a scanner, but the divers did not bring the bones to the surface. The Siberian Times states that there was no evidence that anything other than the dogfish were discovered.

In 2019, extensive research to identify and create a species list of Lake Labynkyr during open water and ice cover was completed and reported in the 2020 article, The insight into diatom diversity, ecology, and biogeography of an extreme cold ultraoligotrophic Lake Labynkyr at the Pole of Cold in the northern hemisphere. The authors write that the first ever sampling was done in 1961 and revealed 79 species. The 2019 goals were to study the flora and compare the lake with other lakes of Yautia and with Lake Baikal. Their research found a total of 123 taxa with three new species of flora.

== Labynkyr Devil ==
According to folklore and cryptozoologists, lake Labynkyr is the location of a dreadful lake monster called the "Labynkyr Devil". The earliest written mention of the lake monster was from geologist Viktor Tverdokhlebov who wrote in 1953 that "'There have been all sort of hypothesises about what kind of creature it could be: a giant pike, a relic reptile or an amphibia. We didn't manage to prove or to disprove these versions; we managed to find remains of jaws and skeleton of some animal'". Other modern scientists have related that when using echo sounding devices or sonar they found a dense object in the water that was above the bottom of the lake and was not a fish or a shoal of fish. Local residents report seeing "something strange" and local folklore goes back many generations with stories of the "Devil". Accounts of something moving under boats in a calm lake, shaking the vessel, one story of fishermen being bucked as "'if somebody was pushing it from under the water ... The fishermen were stuck by fear. They did not see anything, no head, no jaws. Soon the boat went down'". A fisherman in 2000 stated that they got a signal from an echo sounding device that something big was under their boat, they saw "interesting trails on the water" and also found crushed gulls that had been sleeping on an island in the lake. Other witnesses state that they have seen the head and giant mouth and teeth of the creature. Local legends state that the "Devil" can survive outside of the water and has attacked people and animals.

Geologist Sergei Karpukhin who spent 35 days alone on the lake stated that there wasn't a big enough population of the creatures to allow them to survive. "'A little pack of them, like male/female plus several cubs is not enough,' he said. 'To survive this population must have such a number of animals that the lake would be swarming with them. Or at least there should be such number of them, that they would not go unnoticed'". Diver Shiller said he was aware of the Tverdokhlebov story of a lake monster, but on their many dives did not see anything but large dogfish. He said "'We did see mirages there, something like moving islands, but all of us know that it is a common thing in any Northern area with lots of ice and snow, so it is not something special about Labynkyr.'"

Yury Gerasimov from the Institute of Freshwater Biology at the Russian Academy of Sciences questioned the size of such a large fish like a pike. From the stories that are told about it, it must be about 7 to 8 meters (23 to 26 ft). For a fish to grow you need "'nutrition and comfortable water temperatures. Even if nutrition is perfect there, surely the temperatures are not that high. So, in my opinion, the view about a huge pike is a fantastic one'".
