= Nahuelito =

Alleged cryptid in Argentina

- Purported sighting of Nahuelito (circa 1988)

Creature information
- Sub grouping: Lake Monster / Sea Serpent
- Similar entities: Loch Ness Monster, Ogopogo, Altamaha-ha, Tahoe Tessie

Origin
- Country: Argentina
- Region: Nahuel Huapi Lake
- Habitat: Water

Nahuelito is a lake monster purported to live in Nahuel Huapi Lake, Patagonia, Argentina. Like Nessie, the Loch Ness Monster, the Argentine creature is named after the lake it supposedly resides in and has been described as a giant serpent or a huge hump, as well as a plesiosaur. Nahuelito has been allegedly shown through photos showing a hump or a serpentine body.

== History ==
The monster's name means yaguarete, which is a large felid species from the Americas. The origin of the current legend is believed to go back to indigenous stories prior to the colonization of the Americas. The first colonizers obtained from the native population stories about occasional encounters with aquatic monsters. In 1897, Dr. Clemente Onelli, director of the Buenos Aires Zoo, began to receive sporadic reports about a possible strange creature inhabiting the Patagonian lakes.

In 1910, George Garret worked at a company located near the Nahuel Huapi. After navigating the lake, he was preparing to disembark when he witnessed a creature about 400 m (440 yards) away, the visible part of which was between 5 and 7 m (16 and 23 feet) long and protruded about 2 m (6.6 feet) above the water. Commenting on his experience with the locals, Garret learned of similar stories told by the indigenous people. But Garret's sighting in 1910 was only made public in 1922, when he recounted it to the Toronto Globe newspaper. It was echoed in the international press, which he took as motivation to organize the first expedition to search for Nahuelito. The Buenos Aires Zoo has been attempting to collect evidence of a plesiosaur in Argentina's Patagonian lakes since 1922, under the patronage of Clemente Onelli, but no consequential evidence has been found. The small lake where the presence of the creature was claimed is known today as Laguna del Plesiosaurio (Plesiosaur's lagoon).

In 1960, the Argentine Navy was said to have chased an unidentified underwater object in the lake for 18 days, without being able to identify it, which some people related to this alleged creature.

In 1988, photos of the Nahuelito were published in a magazine of the Río Negro newspaper. These were taken at a short distance with a film camera, in which the object was near the coast of Bariloche. A man, who did not reveal his name, said in a letter he left with the photos, "It is not a log of whimsical shapes. It is not a wave. Nahuelito showed his face".
