= Lake Brosno =

Lake in Tver Oblast, Russia

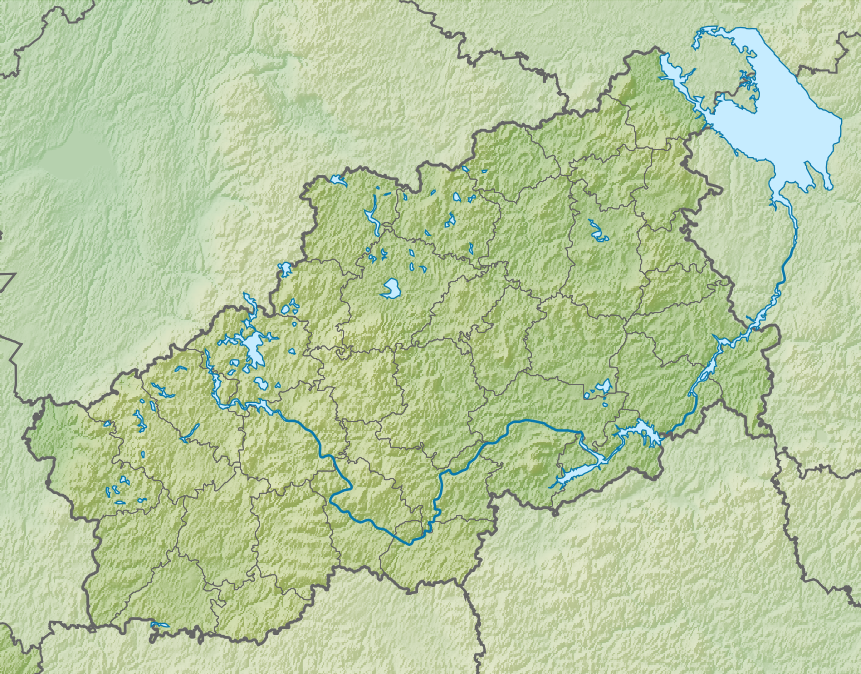
- Location within Tver Oblast Location within European Russia
- Location: Tver
- Coordinates: 56.826°N 31.942°E
- Basin countries: Russia
- Max. depth: 43 m (141 ft)

Lake Brosno is a lake situated in the European part of Russia, in the Tver region, near the town of Andreapol. It is the place where the Brosno dragon, the lake monster in Russian folklore, is supposed to live. The lake's depth is about 43 meters (140 feet) at its deepest point, and it has a sunken church in its western part. Among the fish that inhabit the lake are perch and burbot.
