= Lucy and the Lake Monster =

- Directed by: Richard Rossi
- Written by: Richard Rossi; Kelly Tabor
- Starring: Emma Pearson; Richard Rossi; Kelly Tabor
- Cinematography: Daniel Burke
- Edited by: Colin Tracy; Richard Rossi
- Music by: Joe Rossi; Richard Rossi
- Distributed by: Amazon; Plex; Freevee; Roku; Apple TV; YouTube: (Family Central), (Cinema Epoch), (Epic Movie Chronicles); Tubi
- Release date: September 2024
- Running time: 83 minutes
- Country: USA
- Language: English

Lucy and the Lake Monster is a 2024 American family drama film written and directed by Richard Rossi, and co-written by Kelly Tabor. Emma Pearson stars as nine-year-old orphan Lucy Lago, Richard Rossi as her grandfather Papa Jerry, and Kelly Tabor as Lucy's teacher, Miss Marino.

== Background ==
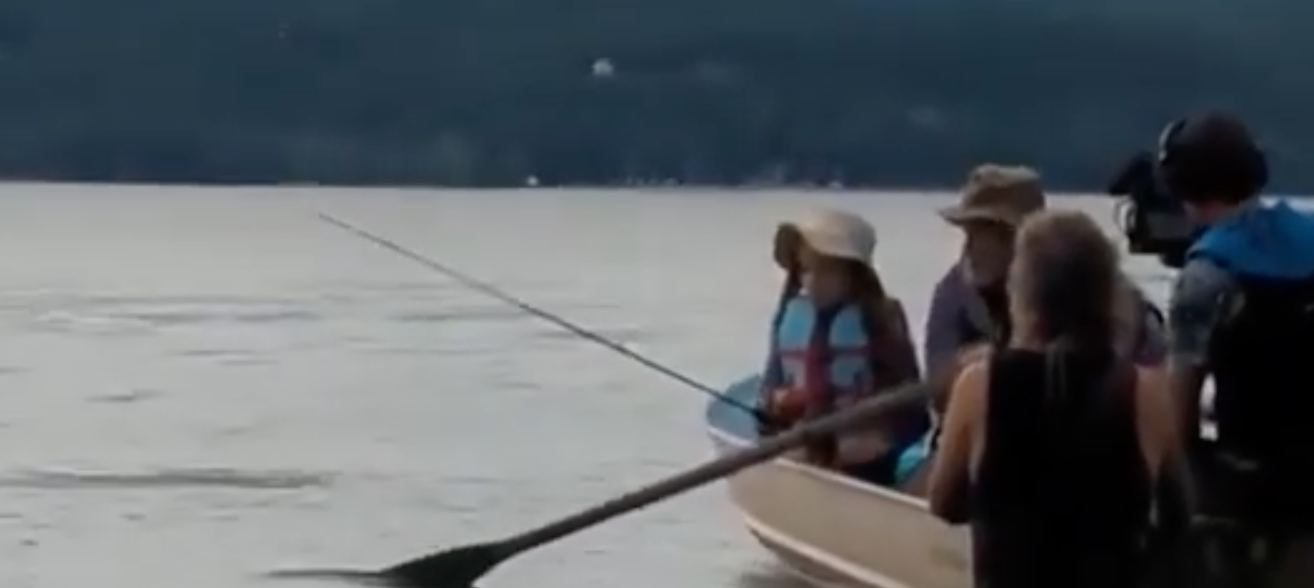
Cameramen film on Lake Champlain for the film Lucy and the Lake Monster.

In 2022, media reported that the feature film, Lucy and the Lake Monster, was in the works about a young orphan girl and her grandfather looking for the lake monster Champ, the film being based on a children's novel with the same title, loosely inspired by co-writer Kelly Tabor's childhood memories exploring Lake Champlain. WCAX-TV, Sun Community News, the Press-Republican, and other media reported the book and film are the first in a series.

== Plot ==
Lucy and the Lake Monster follows the journey of a young girl named Lucy and her grandfather, Papa Jerry, as they search for the creature known as Champ, rumored to inhabit Lake Champlain. After the loss of her mother, Lucy grapples with her grief and the skepticism of her peers, particularly a bully named Butch who makes fun of her belief in Champ.

Papa Jerry, who is supportive of Lucy, often shares comforting words about faith, love, and the importance of believing in the unseen, drawing parallels between their search for Champ and their personal journey through loss. He instills in Lucy the notion that evidence of belief isn't always tangible, and this sense of trust not only brings them closer but also helps Lucy honor her mother's memory.

The story combines elements of adventure and fantasy, showcasing Lucy's determination to locate Champ, using her imagination and her and Papa's musical talent as a means to attract the creature. Throughout her adventure, Lucy faces bullying and skepticism from her peers, and opposition from an evil couple, Beezel Beemish and Mercenary Mike, but she finds strength in the love of her Papa and the guidance of her school teacher, Miss Marino.

As the narrative unfolds, Lucy and her grandfather undertake quests on the lake. Their shared experiences come full circle during a climactic moment when they finally spot Champ, leading to revelations about belief, love, and connection.

The film culminates in a mayoral ceremony where Lucy receives recognition for her efforts and the unique bond she shares with her grandfather, as well as a validation of her hope and dreams.

== Cast ==
- Emma Pearson as Lucy
- Richard Rossi as Papa Jerry
- Kelly Tabor as Miss Marino
- D.G. Peltan as Mercenary Mike
- Lori Francisco-McVicar as Beezel Beemish

== Production and Reception ==
The production filmed in Port Henry, New York and in various locations around Lake Champlain's Bulwagga Bay in July and August, 2022. Newspapers in the Lake Champlain region reported the film finished in 2024, and premiered in the Lake Champlain region in September, 2024. As of 2025, the film has garnered multiple prizes on the film festival circuit and is streaming on Amazon and Plex. The film is internationally distributed, and both the book and the film are award-winners.

== Alleged Evidence for Champ Legend ==
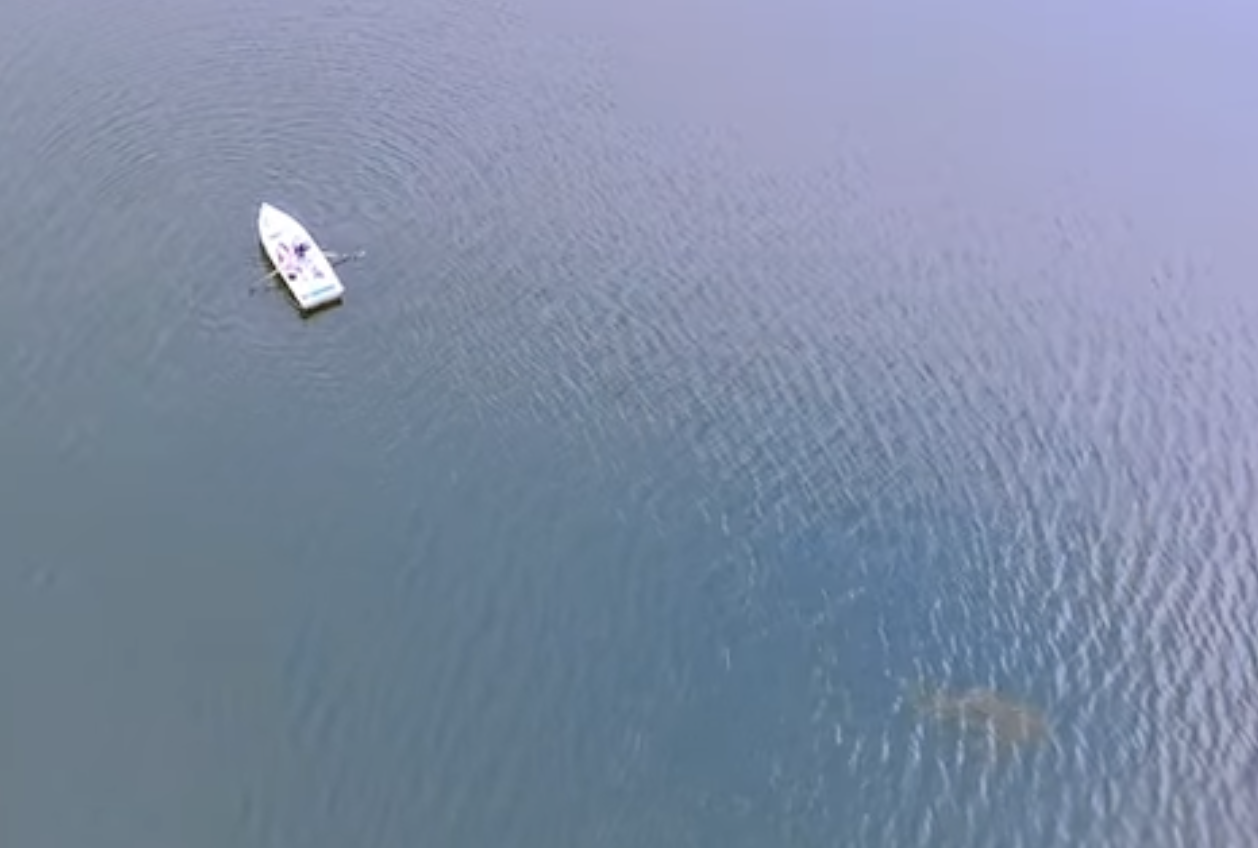
Still shot from 5 minute drone footage of Champ swimming behind boat containing two lead actors in the Lucy and the Lake Monster film

During post-production of the film, the filmmakers reviewed their drone footage from production on August 2, 2024, and noticed what appeared to be a large creature swimming just below the surface of the water in Bulwagga Bay. The alleged creature is visible in the bottom right portion of the screen, swimming behind a boat on which the two lead actors of the film were aboard. The boat was 142 inches from the tip of the bow to the stern and 50.5 inches at the widest point, and the alleged creature appears to be larger than the boat.

One of the co-writers, Kelly Tabor, believes it to be a foundational piece of evidence for Champ. The second co-writer and director of the film, Richard Rossi, said that he shared the footage with scientists. A ten-second clip from the longer twelve-minute footage was shared publicly on YouTube and went viral worldwide, garnering millions of views.

On October 3, 2025, William Shatner presented the Tabor-Rossi footage on his program The UnXplained, a television series on History. The show had various experts analyze the footage, and the conclusion was that Champ might be real (Season 7, Episode 15, "Terrors of the Deep".)
