= Wild Goose Festival =

Annual festival in North Carolina, US

- Mainstage at Wild Goose Festival 2011
- Genre: Mixed
- Dates: Labor Day weekend
- Locations: VanHoy Farms & Campground, North Carolina
- Years active: 2011–2019; 2021–ongoing
- Website: wildgoosefestival.org

The Wild Goose Festival is an art, music, and story-driven festival grounded in faith-inspired social justice. The nationwide annual event is attended by between 1,000-approximately 3,500, in Union Grove, North Carolina. There have also been some regional events. It encourages co-creation of music, story, theater, and spectacle, and engagement in a wide variety of robust, respectful conversations with participants and with thought leaders and artists from other communities. Wild Goose is welcoming and hospitable to people of all faiths – or no faith – who join in seeking the common good. It fully affirms and celebrates people of every age, ethnicity, gender, gender expression, sexual identity, education, bodily condition, religious affiliation, and economic background, particularly those who are most often marginalized.

Wild Goose is rooted in Progressive Christianity, moving beyond belief and centered in justice and compassion, in solidarity with the marginalized and the oppressed. The festival is popular among many involved with the emerging church movement.

The Wild Goose Community is committed to Co-Creation, Storytelling, Radical Hospitality. Real Relationship, Non-Violence, and Continual Evolution.

== History ==
The Wild Goose Festival was inspired in by the popular Greenbelt festival in the United Kingdom. The board of directors for the Wild Goose Festival was formed in 2009, and Gareth Higgins was hired as festival director in March 2010. Rosa Lee Hardin succeeded Higgins in 2013, and in 2016 Rosa Lee was succeeded by Jeff Clark.

The first festival was held June 23–26, 2011, at Shakori Hills farm (home of the Shakori Hills Grassroots Festival) in Silk Hope, North Carolina. It was attended by an estimated 1,500 people. Music at the 2011 festival included Michelle Shocked, David Wilcox, Over The Rhine, Jennifer Knapp, Derek Webb, David Bazan, David LaMotte, Tom Prasada-Rao, Ashley Cleveland, Agents of Future, Sarah Masen, Psalters, Denison Witmer, and The Redding Brothers.

Speakers at the 2011 festival included Jim Wallis, Brian McLaren, T-Bone Burnett, Father Richard Rohr, Rev. Matt Pritchard, Phyllis Tickle, Vincent Harding, John Dear, Shane Claiborne, Lynne Hybels, Tony Campolo, Diana Butler Bass, Paul Knitter, Soong-Chan Rah, Frank Schaeffer, Jay Bakker, Peter Rollins, Doug Pagitt, Richard Twiss, Carl McColman, Tony Jones, Margot Starbuck, Ian Cron, David Dark, Jonathan Wilson-Hartgrove, Nadia Bolz-Weber, Mark Scandrette, Ed Dobson, Paul Fromberg, Melvin Bray, Cynthia La Grou, Eliacin Rosario-Cruz, Anthony Smith, Samir Selmanovic, Chad Holtz, Becky Knight, Kester Brewin, and Pamela Wilhelms.

In 2012, festivals were held in Shakori Hills, North Carolina and in Portland, Oregon. The festival moved to Hot Springs, North Carolina, in 2013 and has continued there until 2022, when Wild Goose Festival moved to VanHoy Farms & Campground in Union Grove, North Carolina.

The COVID-19 pandemic concerns caused the 2020 event to be cancelled; the 10th was deferred to 2021. The 2022 festival was moved to Union Grove, North Carolina, where the 2023 festival was held on July 13-16, the usual 2nd weekend in July dates. The festival has now moved to Labor Day weekend.
