= Kongamato =

Pterosaur-looking reptilian cryptid in Central Africa

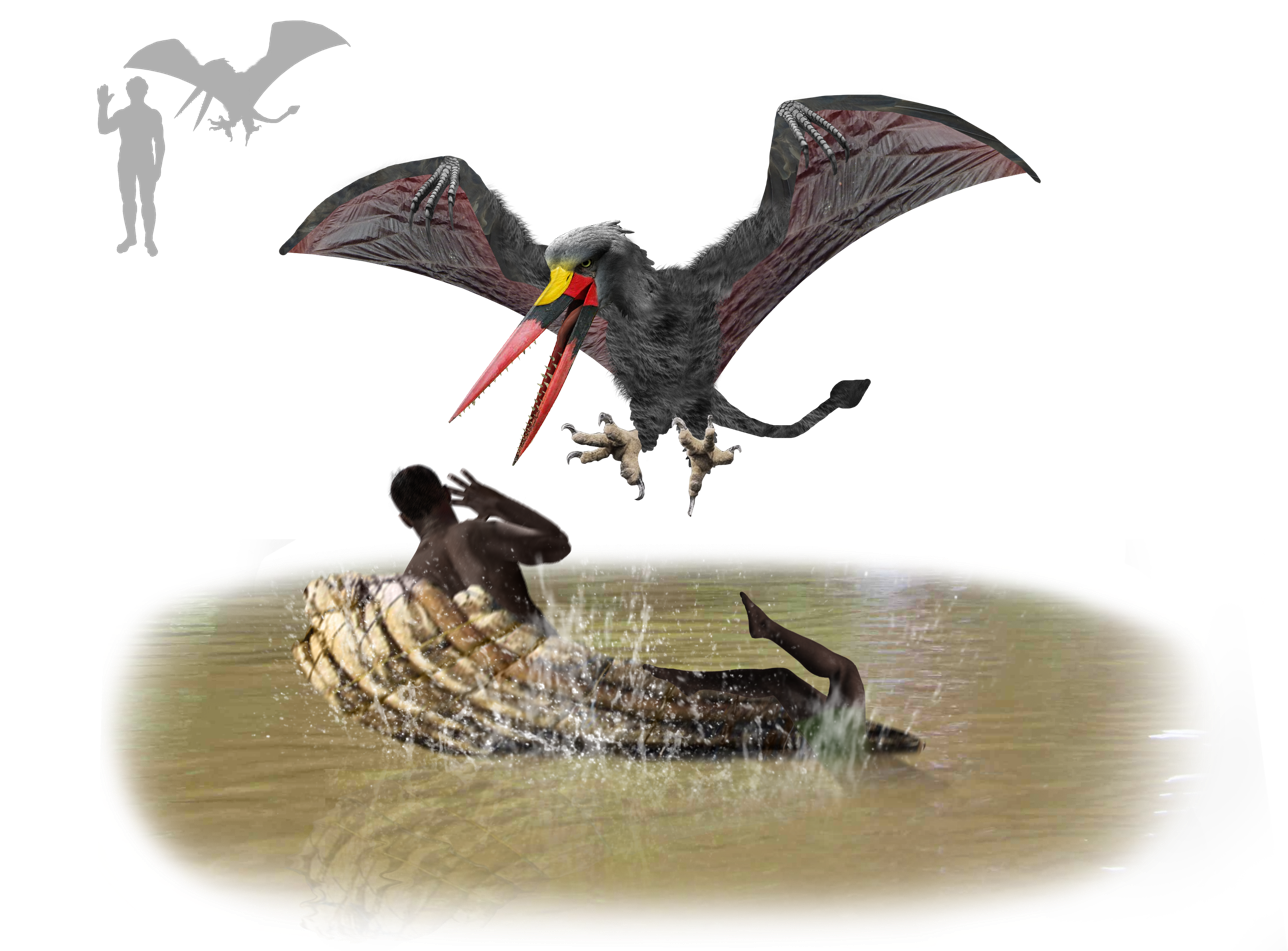
- An artist's impression of the kongamato attacking a boat.

Creature information
- Grouping: Cryptid
- Sub grouping: Pterosauria

Origin
- First attested: 1923
- Country: Zambia, Angola, Democratic Republic of the Congo
- Habitat: Jiundun swamps

The Kongamato ("overwhelmer of boats") is a pterosaurlike cryptid reportedly seen by members of the indigenous population and researchers in the Jiundu Swamps in the Mwinilunga district of western Zambia, Angola, and the Democratic Republic of the Congo. It has been suggested that it may be a surviving pterosaur like a Rhamphorynchus, a giant bat, or an unidentified bird (such as the morphologically similar saddle-billed stork). Skeptics have argued that such sightings are likely the misidentification of known fauna with superficially prehistoric features. Most accounts are based on large wounds and eyewitness testimony. The kongamato has been discussed alongside similar pterosaurlike cryptids, like the ropen and duah of Papua New Guinea, as well as the Texas "big bird".

== Description ==
The kongamato is said to have a wingspan of approximately 4–7 feet (1.2–2.1 m). Further descriptions note a lack of feathers, smooth and mainly reddish skin, as well as a toothy beak. Variation in color and a tail have also been reported. In Frank Melland's 1923 book In Witch-Bound Africa, he claimed that some details were up for debate as "no one ever saw a kongamato close and lived to tell the tale". Local legends ostensibly implied that the act of witnessing the kongamato was in and of itself considered dangerous. The word kongamato means "overwhelmer of boats".

== History ==
Frank Melland describes the alleged creature in his 1923 book In Witch-Bound Africa. The kongamato is said to live around certain rivers and is considered very dangerous. It has reportedly attacked boats, specifically by means of diving into the water and capsizing them from below. The coloration has been described as reddish, and the wingspan has been reported to stretch between 4 and 7 feet (1.2 and 2.1 m). Members of the Kaondé, upon seeing an image in Melland's book, determined that the creature looked exactly like a pterosaur. It was said to inhabit the Jiundu swamp.

Two years later, press correspondent G. Ward Price reported in his book Extra-Special Correspondent that he, along with then-future King Edward VIII, were audience to firsthand eyewitness testimony regarding the kongamato in Southern Rhodesia. During this trip, they met a local man who had been injured in a nearby swamp. The swampland in question was particularly feared in the region, and he reportedly identified the animal that attacked him based on an illustration of a pterosaur. It was also reported that he reacted with a state of heightened fear at the sight of the image.

In 1932, naturalist Gerald Russell and cryptozoologist Ivan T. Sanderson claimed to have sighted a kongamato together in Cameroon, which Sanderson theorized was a type of hammerhead bat. Further sightings were reported by engineer J.P.F. Brown from Zaire in 1956, and by an individual identified as D. Gregor from Southern Rhodesia who, along with his wife, claimed to have witnessed flying reptiles.

In 1957, a man with severe chest injuries arrived in a hospital in the area where Brown had claimed to have seen his pterosaurs. The man stated that he had been attacked by a large bird in the Bangweulu Swamps. When the doctors asked him to draw the attacker, he purportedly sketched the outline of a pterosaur.

An alleged photograph of an unknown animal was claimed to have been taken by Ian Colvin of the Daily Telegraph in the Zambezi Valley near the end of the 1950s. It was speculated to be a pterosaurlike creature by at least one viewer, but upon analysis, the subject of the image was determined to most likely be a shoebill stork or a saddle-billed stork.

== Explanations ==
Skeptics have argued that such a dramatic discontinuity in the fossil record is not only unlikely, but also that the theoretical limitations on how pterosaurs could fold their wings would most likely preclude the water-diving behavior reported by locals. Skeptics have instead suggested that sightings of pterosaurlike cryptids such as the kongamato may be attributable to misidentified fauna, such as birds with phenotypic traits that might be confused with those of prehistoric animals. Carl Winman, a professor of paleontology from Uppsala University, hypothesized in 1928 that the legends could have stemmed from Tanzanian locals participating in paleontological unearthings of pterosaur fossils in the east prior to World War I, the stories of which eventually morphed as they made their way westward. Reay Smithers, who directed Southern Rhodesia's National Museum, opined in 1957 that shoebill storks might be behind the sightings, at least in the case of J.P.F. Brown's account. Zoologist Maurice Burton concurred with this hypothesis in the early 1960s. It has been proposed by author Rick Emmer that saddle-billed storks or marabou storks defending their nests may be the origin of the boat attack legends.

Several cryptozoologists themselves have taken a relatively skeptical approach to the kongamato, with Ivan T. Sanderson and Bernard Heuvelmans both endorsing the megabat theory to varying degrees. Cryptozoologist Loren Coleman and writer Jerome Clark subtly implied their own skepticism toward the pterosaur hypothesis, ending the kongamato chapter in Cryptozoology A to Z by stating: "Other cryptozoologists, such as Karl Shuker and Mackal, have toyed with the idea, perhaps not too seriously, that the kongamato may be a surviving pterosaur."

== See also ==
- Mokele-mbembe – Water-dwelling entity that supposedly lives in the Congo River Basin
- Mbielu-mbielu-mbielu – Alleged living Stegosaurid in the Congo
- Dingonek – Cryptid allegedly seen in Africa in the early 20th century
