= Richard Greenwell =

Cryptozoologist (1942–2005)

J. Richard Greenwell (1942 – November 1, 2005) was a cryptozoologist and explorer. He participated in expeditions to look for mysterious creatures or cryptids. He was the secretary for the International Society for Cryptozoology from its inception to his death.

== Biography ==
Born in Surrey, England, Greenwell travelled to South America and stayed there for six years. He later travelled to Tucson, Arizona, where he was appointed research coordinator for the Office of Arid Land Studies at the University of Arizona. During the 1970s, he was assistant director of the Aerial Phenomena Research Organization (APRO) in Tucson.

=== Cryptozoology and expeditions ===
In 1982, after a discussion with Roy Mackal, Greenwell helped to found the International Society for Cryptozoology. With funding from the society, he was able to travel the planet searching for Bigfoot, the Onza, and Mokele-mbembe. He also journeyed to China along with the anthropologist Frank Poirier to try to discover the Yeren, a Chinese version of Bigfoot. All the expeditions were unsuccessful.

=== Later life ===
Greenwell wrote a column for BBC Wildlife Magazine for several years. He also appeared as a paid consultant on various documentaries about cryptozoology and lectured at universities and museums. For the last several years of his life Greenwell was a research associate at the International Wildlife Museum in Tucson, where he also ran the International Society for Cryptozoology. He participated in his last expedition in August 2005, searching for evidence of Bigfoot in the Northern Californian wilderness, while he was in the last stages of cancer. He died on November 1, 2005, in Tucson, Arizona.

== Legacy ==
Greenwell is commemorated in the scientific name of a species of Nigerian snake in the family Leptotyphlopidae, Tricheilostoma greenwelli.
