= Monique Watteau =

Belgian fantasy fiction writer and artist

- Born: Monique Dubois; 23 December 1929 (age 96); Liège, Belgium
- Other names: Alika Watteau; Alika Lindbergh
- Occupations: Writer, artist
- Known for: Fantasy fiction, cryptozoological art
- Spouses: Bernard Heuvelmans (divorced 1961); Scott Lindbergh (married 1968–1983)

Alika Lindbergh (born Monique Dubois, 23 December 1929), commonly known by her former name Monique Watteau, is a Belgian fantasy fiction writer and artist.

== Early life ==
Watteau was born Monique Dubois in Liège on 23 December 1929. Her father was Hubert Dubois, a playwright and poet with ties to Surrealism.

Watteau studied painting and drawing at the Académie royale des beaux-arts de Liège, and then went on to the Royal Conservatory of Liège to study theatre. At twenty, she left Belgium for Paris, where she met the Belgian scientist Bernard Heuvelmans, famous for his work in cryptozoology. In 1951, she appeared under the name Monique Watteau in Jean Anouilh's film Two Pennies' Worth of Violets. She also worked as a photography model.

== Career ==
Watteau's first novel, La colère végétale, was published in 1954. Critics praised it as a striking literary debut; Albert-Marie Schmidt wrote that Watteau had created "a new kind of fantasy" (un nouveau fantastique). Watteau was reportedly considered for the Prix Goncourt and the Prix Femina, but she was removed from the running of the latter prize in 1954 when the jury discovered that she had posed for nude photographs.

Her following novels, La nuit aux yeux de bête (1956), L'ange à fourrure (1958), and Je suis le ténébreux (1962), cemented her reputation as one of the foremost Francophone fantasy writers of the twentieth century. Her work is marked by its sensuality of expression and its ecological, Taoist, and Surrealist themes. The writer Anne Richter described Watteau's novels as prime examples of feminism in twentieth-century fantasy.

Her first three novels were written under the name Monique Watteau; her fourth gave her name as Monique-Alika Watteau. After its publication, she abandoned the name Monique altogether, going by Alika Watteau and later Alika Lindbergh.

After publishing four novels, she turned to painting as a career. Her output as a painter includes a notable corpus of cryptozoological art, including her work as the primary illustrator of Bernard Heuvelmans's books. When the cartoonist Hergé, researching Tintin in Tibet, asked Heuvelmans for details on the yeti, Watteau supplied a "graphic reconstitution" of the creature for Hergé's reference.

In the 1970s, Watteau published two new books, Nous sommes deux dans l'Arche et Quand les singes hurleurs se tairont. She published an autobiographical work, Le testament d'une fée, in 2002.

Watteau also worked as an animal rights activist. In the early 1990s, she was the president of the Cercle national pour la défense de la vie, de la nature, et de l'animal (CNDVNA), a conservation advocacy group within the French National Front.

== Personal life ==
Heuvelmans was Watteau's first husband; they divorced in 1961, but remained friends and collaborators. According to her autobiography, Watteau was romantically involved with actor Yul Brynner from 1961 to 1967. It was after this affair that she changed her first name to Alika, which she and Brynner had used as her nom d'amour.

She married zoologist Scott Lindbergh, son of aviator Charles Lindbergh, in 1968. In 1972, Lindbergh and Watteau established a grant-funded primate research center on an 82-acre estate in the Dordogne valley in France, where they raised and studied dozens of South American monkeys. Watteau and Lindbergh separated in 1983.

During Watteau's marriage to Lindbergh, the couple arranged for Heuvelmans, then in poverty, to live in a small house on the grounds of the Dordogne estate. Watteau attended to Heuvelmans during his final years, and was with him at his death in 2001. In accordance with his last wishes, Watteau was in charge of his private funeral in Le Vésinet.

== List of works ==
The following list comprises the original publications of Watteau's works. Because Watteau used multiple names, each entry includes the name under which the work was published.

=== As writer ===
- Monique Watteau, La colère végétale (Paris: Plon, 1954)
- Monique Watteau, La nuit aux yeux de bête (Paris: Plon, 1956)
- Monique Watteau, L'ange à fourrure (Paris: Plon, 1958)
- Monique-Alika Watteau, Je suis le ténébreux (Paris: Julliard, 1962)
- Alika Lindbergh, Nous sommes deux dans l'arche (Paris: Presses de la Cité, 1975)
- Alika Lindbergh, Quand les singes hurleurs se tairont (Paris: Presses de la Cité, 1976)
- Alika Lindbergh, Le testament d'une fée (Paris: E-dite, 2002)
- Alika Lindbergh, "Préface," in Bernard Marck, Lindbergh, l'ange noir (Paris: L'Archipel, 2006)
- Alika Lindbergh, "Préface," in Jean-Jacques Barloy, Bernard Heuvelmans, un rebelle de la science (Paris: Oeil du sphinx, 2007)

=== As illustrator ===
- Hubert Dubois, Le danseur du sacre: poèmes, frontispiece by Monique Watteau (Brussels: Éditions des artistes, 1953)
- André Romus, Voix dans le labyrinthe, frontispiece by Monique Watteau (Paris: Éditions James, P.J. Oswald, 1954)
- Bernard Heuvelmans, Sur la piste des bêtes ignorées, illustrations by Monique Watteau (Paris: Plon, 1955)
- Bernard Heuvelmans, Dans le sillage des monstres marins, Vol. I, Le kraken et le poulpe colossal, illustrations by Monique Watteau (Paris: Plon, 1958)
- Edward Lear, Le hibou et la poussiquette, translated by Francis Steegmuller, illustrated by Monique-Alika Watteau (London: Hart-Davis, 1961)
- Bernard Heuvelmans, Le grand serpent-de-mer: le problème zoologique et sa solution: histoire des bêtes ignorées de la mer, illustrated by Alika Watteau (Paris: Plon, 1965)
- Albert Jeannin, En vacances avec l'oncle Antoine, four volumes, illustrated by Alika Watteau (Lausanne: Rencontre, 1967)
- Bernard Heuvelmans, Les derniers dragons d'Afrique, illustrated by Alika Lindbergh (Paris: Plon, 1978)
- Bernard Heuvelmans, Les bêtes humaines d'Afrique, illustrated by Alika Lindbergh (Paris: Plon, 1980)
- Jean-Léo, Histoire illustrée du cirque à Bruxelles: saltimbanques et gens du voyage depuis le dix-septième siècle, illustrations by Alika Lindbergh and others (Brussels: Archives générales du Royaume, 1998)

=== Other works ===
- Ian Cameron, Le cimetière des cachalots, translated from the English by Alika Watteau (Paris: Laffont, 1966)
- Allain Bougrain-Dubourg, L'agonie des bébés phoques, contributions by Alika Lindbergh and others (Paris: Presses de la Cité, 1978)
- Regards croisés: collectif d'artistes peintres animaliers: Zsuzsa Farkas, Alika Lindbergh, István Nemes, catalogue for a Musée Cantonal de Zoologie exhibition of paintings by Lindbergh and others, 17 March to 19 May 2002 (Lausanne: Musée cantonal de zoologie, 2002)
