= Mbielu-mbielu-mbielu =

Alleged living Stegosaurid in the Congo

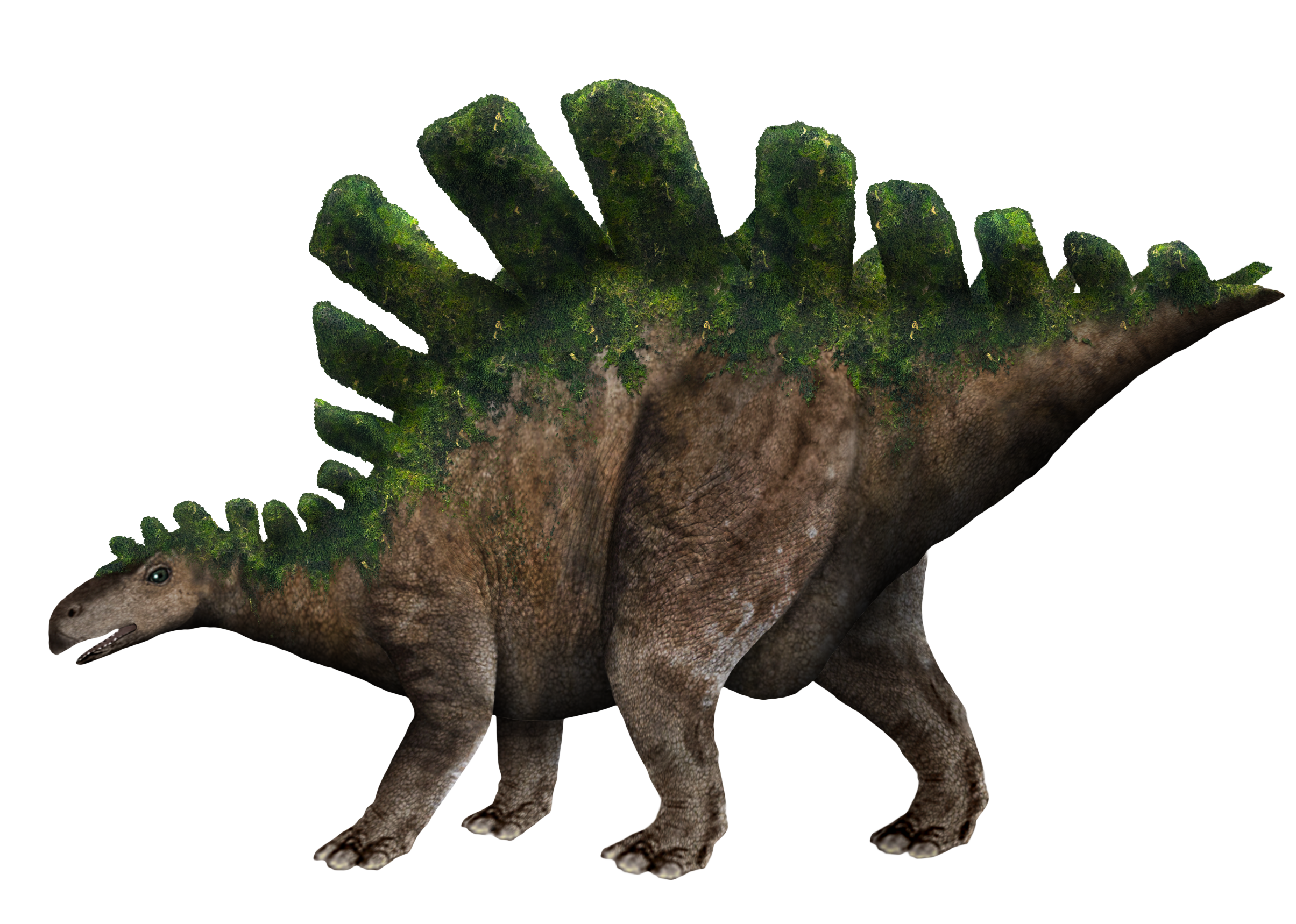
- An artistic rendition of mbielu-mbielu-mbielu by Tim Bertelink.

Creature information
- Grouping: Cryptid
- Similar entities: Mokele-mbembe

Origin
- Country: Democratic Republic of the Congo
- Habitat: Likouala River

Mbielu-mbielu-mbielu ("the animal with planks growing out of its back") is a cryptid reportedly seen at the Likouala River in the Democratic Republic of the Congo.

== Description ==
A complete description of mbielu-mbielu-mbielu's appearance has never been completely agreed upon by cryptozoologists; however, it is said to have green "planks" growing out of its back, leading some in cryptozoological circles to propose that the alleged animal represents an extant stegosaurid.

Similarities have also been drawn to another purported cryptid from Africa, the nguma-monene. It has also been suggested that the mbielu-mbielu-mbielu may be synonymous with mokele-mbembe; however, mokele-mbembe has not been described as possessing "planks" growing out of its back.

== Habitat ==
Similar to accounts of another alleged dinosaur-like cryptid, emela-ntouka, it has been said that mbielu-mbielu-mbielu can be sighted in the rivers and lakes of Likouala-Mossaka in the Democratic Republic of the Congo.

Mbielu-mbielu-mbielu is said to typically submerge itself in water with only its back showing, which is often covered in (usually green) algal growths. It has also been claimed that mbielu-mbielu-mbielu is mostly active in the afternoon.

== Sightings ==
The first sighting of mbielu-mbielu-mbielu purportedly took place in a location called "Ikeikesse", which is near Epena, the Republic of the Congo.

== Possible explanations ==
American biologist Roy Mackal subscribed to the theory that mbielu-mbielu-mbielu was a giant monitor lizard; however, Mackal also regarded the animal as an "enigma".

American anthropologist Dale A. Drinnon theorised that the creature could be a species of giant crocodilian with a serrated back.

In 1980, Odette Gesonget (a local from Bouanila, the Republic of the Congo) selected an image of a Stegosaurus from books provided by Mackal in providing a description of mbielu-mbielu-mbielu. However, she also disclosed that she had never actually witnessed the creature herself, having ostensibly based her selection on information shared by her parents and grandparents.

Mackal also cites anecdotal evidence that cave paintings of "elephant-like creatures with stegosaurus-like backs" have reportedly been discovered in multiple areas.

== See also ==
- Mokele-mbembe
- Kongamato
