= Nittaewo =

Hominid cryptid native to Sri Lanka

Creature information
- Grouping: Cryptid
- Sub grouping: Hominid

Origin
- Country: Sri Lanka
- Region: South Asia
- Habitat: Rainforest

Nittaewo (or Nittevo) were said to be a small tribe of short-statured bigfoot or Yeti-like hominid cryptids native to Sri Lanka. No archeological evidence has been found to prove the existence of these humanoids, but they are ubiquitous in Veddha mythology and Sri Lankan folklore.

== Etymology ==
Hugh Nevill explained that "nittaewo" may be a derivative from "niṣāda", an Indo-Aryan term that referred to some indigenous tribes. The Sinhalese form of this word was "nigadiwa" or "nishadiwa," from which "nittaewo" may have derived. A possible alternative etymology given by George Eberhart is "niya-atha" ("one who possesses nails").

== Description ==
The nittaewo were described as being even smaller than the diminutive Veddahs, only between 3 and 4 ft (0.91 and 1.22 m) in height, with the females being even shorter. They were covered in hair, which was often said to be reddish in colour, and were said to have very short, powerful arms with short, long-clawed hands. Unlike monkeys, they walked upright always and had no tails.

The nittaewo lived in small parties, and slept in caves or among the branches of trees, in leaf-nests of their own design. They had a varied diet, eating whatever raw game they could catch, including squirrels, small deer, tortoises, lizards, and sometimes even crocodiles. They did not use tools, instead disembowelling their prey with their long claws or hooked nails, allowing them to feed on the entrails. They were said to have a sort of language of their own, a "sort of burbling, or birds' twittering," which a handful of Veddahs could understand. The Veddahs themselves were the enemies of the nittaewo, which had no defense against the Veddahs’ bows and arrows. It was said that whenever a nittaewa came across a sleeping Veddah, it would disembowel them with its claws.

During an exploration of caves at Kudimbigala, army captain A. T. Rambukwelle discovered a stone building, "reminiscent of the miniature Stonehenge" in the forest. The Veddahs in the area told him that it was "the nittaewa altar," but Ivan Mackerle later discovered that it had been built by Veddah monks.

== Attestations ==
The last of the nittaewo were said to have been exterminated by the Veddahs of Leanama during the late 18th century, when they were rounded up into a cave, the entrance of which was then blocked up with brushwood which was set alight, suffocating the trapped nittaewo over three days. The cave's position was lost when the Veddahs of Leanama themselves became extinct just a few generations later. Bernard Heuvelmans estimated that the genocide took place in around 1800, whilst Ivan Mackerle estimates 1775.

The story of the extermination was first reported by explorer Hugh Nevill in 1887, who was told of it by a Sinhalese hunter, who was himself told by an elderly Leanama Veddah, who himself had been told by a relative of his named Koraleya. Despite being a fourth-hand account, the story was confirmed in 1915, when Frederick Lewis was given the same information by several informants in Uva and Punawa Pattu. According to an old Veddah named Dissam Hamy, the nittaewo were exterminated no more than five generations earlier than his visit—Dissam Hamy's grandfather had taken part in the genocide. Lewis made inquiries of other people in the village, and in another village, and was given the same story.

== Sightings ==
=== 1963 ===
In 1963, Sri Lankan army captain A. T. Rambukwelle led an expedition to the caves of Kudimbigala to search for evidence of the nittaewo. He discovered the shells of molluscs and vertebrae and shells of turtles, animals which the nittaewo were said to have fed on.

=== 1984 ===
The first and so far only recorded sighting of the nittaewo since the 18th century supposedly occurred in 1984, when one was allegedly seen by the Spanish anthropologist Salvador Martinez. He claimed that the nittaewa he saw was human-like, with a coat of long hair with scabs, and emitted unintelligible sounds before fleeing into the forest.

=== 2019 ===
In 2019, sightings re-surged again starting in several locations such as Walasmulla and Bambaragala and Anuradhapura which often caused panic in certain villages. Villagers reported the creature to be totally black, gorilla faced and having long claws which was different from the Veddah descriptions, leading to the possibility of a fraud.

=== Mistaken identity ===
In 1945, noted primatologist William C. Osman Hill made a detailed examination of the nittaewo, and came up with several plausible identities. Some sort of Sri Lankan gibbon was regarded by both him and Bernard Heuvelmans as a fairly good candidate, as these animals do conform to the nittaewo's description in a number of ways. They are small, only around 3 ft (0.91 m) when standing upright, live in troops, and are the only apes to habitually walk bipedally. Unlike many other apes, they will eat animals such as insects, birds, and eggs. Although a far cry from the savage nittaewa, which was said to disembowel people and kill crocodiles, Heuvelmans notes that the Veddahs may have simply villainized "their greatest enemy".

However, one argument against this theory is the fact that, in India, gibbons—the Indian species are specifically hoolock gibbons (Hoolock spp.), the only modern ape known from India—are only found east of the Ganges and south of the Brahmaputra. They are not known from Sri Lanka, and Heuvelmans writes that it would be surprising to find them there. Gibbons also have famously long, bandy arms, unlike the short arms of the nittaewo.

Hugh Nevill wrote that one of his informants compared the nittaewa to an orangutan. Orangutans have sometimes been reported from mainland India, but Heuvelmans notes that this ape is too large, heavy, arboreal, vegetarian, and solitary to make a good nittaewa identity.

Another suggestion is that the nittaewo could have been bears, which are known to walk bipedally, and leave infamously human-like footprints. However, Sri Lanka's only known bear, the sloth bear (Melursus ursinus), although dangerous when disturbed and liable to inflict severe wounds with its hooked claws, is among the most quadrupedal of bears, only rarely walking upright. Its fur is also usually black, turning red on the surface only occasionally, and it is an insectivore, not a predator.

=== Unknown human race ===
Another theory is that the nittaewo could have been a Sri Lankan population of Negritos, a race native to the Philippines who are about 2 in (51 mm) shorter on average than the Veddahs, who he suggests may have inhabited Sri Lanka before the arrival of the Veddahs. South and Southeast Asia were subject to a great number of racial migrations, with each new race displacing or pushing out the previous rulers, and it is possible that this is what happened with the nittaewo and the Veddahs. However, Heuvelmans concludes by writing that the Negritos "do not look in the least like the description of the nittaewo". Eberhart also records the theory that they may have been some unknown short-statured race of people, similar to the Negritos, the Semang of Malaysia, or the Andaman islanders.

=== Primitive hominoid ===
Hill and Heuvelmans theorised that the nittaewo could have been a surviving Pithecanthropus (now Homo erectus), which is known from Southeast Asia. According to Heuvelmans, Homo erectus no doubt once inhabited the rest of Asia before being pushed down into the Southeast by one of the waves of human invaders mentioned above. Before this decline, however, they might easily have reached Sri Lanka from India when the island was still connected to the mainland—which happened several times prior to 5000 B.C.—and survived until recent times.

Hill also wrote that the size of Homo erectus was consistent with the nittaewo, but this is untrue, as Homo erectus was much closer to a normal human height, creating a problem with the theory. However, Heuvelmans notes that, if they did reach Sri Lanka, they might well have developed into a pygmy race, as often happens with species isolated on islands. The Homo erectus theory was favoured by both Hill and Heuvelmans.

Captain A. T. Rambukwella also theorised that the nittaewo could be a Sri Lankan species of the African Australopithecus, the females of which reached 4.3 ft (1.3 m).

However, the discovery of remains of Homo floresiensis on the island of Flores in Indonesia in 2004 has also led to the belief that they could even be a similar species existing in Sri Lanka.
