= Giant penguin hoax =

Fictitious bird resulting from a hoax

The giant penguin is a creature allegedly seen in Florida during the 1940s and is at least partly documented as a hoax. This legend has no scientific merit, despite there having been giant penguins that became extinct millions of years ago.

== History ==
In 1948, several people reported finding large, three-toed animal tracks at Clearwater Beach in Florida. Later, more tracks were found along the shore of the Suwannee River, 40 miles (64 kilometers) from the ocean.

Later that year, a giant penguin was allegedly sighted at a distance. The huge bird was described as 15 feet (4.6 meters) tall, and having alligator-like feet. During this same period, people in a boat off the Florida gulf coast reported seeing a huge penguin-like bird floating on the water. These incidents were reported in several newspapers. Later that year, another huge, penguin-like bird was allegedly seen from an airplane on the banks of the Suwannee River in northern Florida. Cryptozoologist Ivan T. Sanderson declared that the creature was a giant penguin that had somehow been driven away from its natural habitat.

== The hoax ==
On April 11, 1988, St. Petersburg Times reporter Jan Kirby revealed that the penguin hoax had been perpetrated by Tony Signorini and Al Williams, a locally known prankster who died in 1969. Signorini stated he had been inspired by a photograph of fossilized dinosaur tracks and showed the reporter the huge penguin feet made of iron used in creating the tracks. The hoaxers would row to beaches after dark, where Signorini would strap on the metal feet and hop along the sand, creating trails that appeared to emerge from the Gulf.

The hoax might have remained a local curiosity had it not attracted Ivan Sanderson, a Scottish-born naturalist who wrote for the New York Herald Tribune and hosted a science program on NBC’s flagship station. When Sanderson decided to investigate personally in November 1948, he invited Williams to join the investigation team. “I can state categorically that these tracks could not be made by some unknown animal,” Sanderson declared on radio. The press widely reported this conclusion, with O’Reilly’s newspaper describing tracks made by “simulated dinosaur feet … ingeniously strapped to the legs.” When more tracks appeared after the investigation, Sanderson told reporters: “As far as I’m concerned, the case is closed. The full scope of Sanderson’s deception remained hidden until researcher Daniel Loxton discovered unpublished papers in the 2020s. These documents revealed that Sanderson had been corresponding with hoaxer Al Williams from the beginning, had invited him on the investigation team, and had publicly declared the tracks a hoax.

Most damning, Loxton found Sanderson’s original manuscript for More Things covered in red pencil marks showing exactly how he revised the story. "Sanderson simply erased the critical fact that his expedition publicly declared the tracks to be a hoax. He cut all discussion of suspected hoaxers, including Al Williams," Loxton says. Sanderson deleted "passages discussing inconsistencies in the evidence, the section heading 'Suspicious Circumstances', and a page and a half of general scientific objections."

== Extinct giant penguins ==
There were numerous prehistoric species of gigantic penguins (such as Pachydyptes ponderosus and Anthropornis nordenskjoeldi; see also Palaeeudyptinae). However, actual prehistoric megafaunal birds occurred only in South Pacific and Cape Horn ocean waters. This is known from fossil remains. All such lineages certainly became extinct some 37 to 60 million years ago at the latest; they were never encountered alive by humans and were barely contemporaries of the earliest hominids.

== In literature ==
Giant penguins based on the fossil finds also appear in Jules Verne's novel Journey to the Center of the Earth, and in At the Mountains of Madness by H. P. Lovecraft. In Lovecraft's novella, they are found in a fictitious Antarctic underground setting, and the author attempted a plausible evolutionary explanation for the creatures.
