= On the Track of Unknown Animals =

1955 book by Bernard Heuvelmans

- Cover-art for the 1995 edition
- Author: Bernard Heuvelmans
- Language: French
- Genre: Non-fiction, cryptozoology
- Publication date: 1958
- Publication place: France
- Media type: Print (hardback & paperback)
- ISBN: 0-7103-0498-6

On the Track of Unknown Animals is a cryptozoological book by the Belgian-French zoologist Bernard Heuvelmans that was first published in 1955 under the title Sur la Piste des Bêtes Ignorées. The English translation by Richard Garnett was published in 1958 with some updating by the author and with a foreword by Gerald Durrell. A revised and abridged edition was published in 1965, and a further edition in 1995. It is credited with introducing the term cryptozoology and established its author as the "Father of Cryptozoology."

== Subject ==
As one reviewer explained, it is a book "about animals that might exist." On the Track of Unknown Animals cites animals that had only been discovered relatively recently, such as the pygmy chimpanzee, coelacanth, Komodo dragon and giant panda; and those that are believed to have become extinct relatively recently, such as the moa and Tasmanian tiger. A major theme is that these animals were generally known to local peoples, but their stories were dismissed by visiting zoologists, particularly the okapi.

The author then discusses evidence for mystery animals from all over the world including the Mokele-mbembe, sea serpents and the Yeti, with an extensive bibliography. He begins by complaining that "The Press has made such a laughing-stock of the Loch Ness Monster... that no scientific commission has ever dared tackle the problem" and ends with the wish that any new species are not merely slaughtered for trophies: "Have pity on them all, for it is we who are the real monsters."

Reviewers praised the breadth of study, careful citation and the author's knowledge but it was criticized for being somewhat shallow and "overly long and rambling."

== Contents ==
- Part 1: The Great Days of Zoology are Not Done
- Part 2: The Man-Faced Animals of South-East Asia
- Part 3: The Living Fossils of Oceania
- Part 4: Riddles of the Green Continent
- Part 5: The Giants of the Far North
- Part 6: The Lesson of the Malagasy Ghosts

Accurate summary (from original edition 1955) :

VOLUME 1 – INDO-MALAYSIA, OCEANIA

Introduction.

ZOOLOGICAL ADVENTURE IS NOT DEAD

Chap. 1: The lost world is omnipresent.

Sea serpents and their ilk are no longer the stars – Why we no longer believe in fantastic beasts – Our planet still has many unknowns – The white deserts of the Poles – Africa has not revealed all its mysteries – Light does not necessarily come from the East – The lost worlds of the Green Continent – The terra incognita of zoologists – The Alpine legged worm – The lesson of the Tatzelwurm

Chap. 2: The hope of discovering more unknown beasts.

The imprudent assertion of Baron Cuvier and the inopportune tapir – The giant ape with a dog’s snout and the relict chevrotain – The dwarf hippopotamus, buried by the unbelievers – The aptly named takin and Schomburgk’s invisible deer – Last-minute rescue of the mi-lou – The monkey with the Parisienne nose and Père David’s black and white bear – And the series continues! – President Grevy’s Funny Zebra and Colonel Przewalski’s Horse – Small Fry with a Sensational Character – Three Discreet Giants: the Kodiak Bear, the White Rhino, and the Mountain Gorilla – The Incredible Okapi – The Giant Forest Boar – Resurrection of the Pygmy Hippopotamus – The Third Elephant – The Pygmy Swamp Elephant – The Pygmy Elephant is Not an Invention of Ivory Traffickers – The Komodo Dragon and the White Flag of Lake Toung-Ting – Great Apes Have Their Pygmies Too – A Tale of Enigmatic Feathers – The Animal with No Name, the Leopard-Hyena, and the Flying Jackal – The Romantic Adventure of the Lady and the Giant Panda – The Thorny Case of the Cambodian Gray Ox – Our Latest Acquisition: An Andean Wolf Fur

Chapter 3: Survivors from the Past.

What is a Living Fossil? – Some priceless relics – Apparently stationary beings – The impotence of paleontology – Yesterday: faunas succeed one another – Today: faunas overlap and exterminate each other – The permanence of the process of discovering unknown animals – Our itinerary

THE BEASTS WITH HUMAN FACE OF INDO-MALAYSIA

Chapter 4: Nittaewo, the vanished people of Ceylon.

A paradoxical hunt for the ancestor – The beast-men of Pliny the Elder – From the pygmies of Ctesias to the Negritos del Monte – The dog-headed men – The Veddas, true prototypes of the pygmies of Ctesias – The civilized monkeys of Ibn Batoutah – Portrait of the Nittaewo – The Nittaewo are not Negritos – Are the Nittaewo monkeys? – Are the Nittaewo bears? – The Tailed Men of Indochina – The Sign of the Beast – Demons with Sharp Forearms – Tyrants Follow One Another and Often Look Alike – Are Hairy Gnomes Dwarf Pithecanthropus? – The Moustachioed Ape-Men of Perak

Chapter 5: Orang Pendek, the Incongruous Ape-Man of Sumatra.

Badak Tanggiling, a Very Unusual Rhinoceros – The Identity of the Scaly Rhinoceros – A Puzzle for Zoologists – Invention and Discovery of the Ape-Man – There is Orang and Orang – Portrait of the Little Gibbon – Could It Be an Old, Hairy and Mangy Gibbon? – The testimonies follow one another – A collection of intriguing footprints – The elusive sedapa – An encounter with the ape-man – New footprints in the soft earth – Is the Malayan bear at the origin of the legend? – Blood... a few mysterious hairs – An orang pendek has been shot! – A humiliating mystification

Chap. 6: The abominable “snowman”.

Portrait of the Ogre – The Lugubrious Assembly of Hairy Giants – The Giant with Retroverted Feet – First Hypothesis: It is a Small Monkey – Second Hypothesis: It is a Bear – A Near Certainty: It is a Biped – It Could Be a Giant Monkey – King Kong is Not a Myth – The Giants of China, Java and Africa – The Giants of Genesis: Children of Gods and Women – Is the “Snowman” a Delayed Gigantopithecus? – Alone, on the trail of the “snowman” – A couple of yetis observed for two hours – Why the “snowman” has the neck of a Prussian officer – The consequences of an ancient bipedalism – A price is put on the head of the yeti – There is unknown and unknown – The scalp of the temple of Pangbotchi – Scientific baptism of the “snowman”

THE LIVING FOSSILS OF OCEANIA

Chap. 7: The surreal dinosaur of New Guinea.

An intriguing defense – Face to face with the raou! – Where are Mr. Miller’s pieces of evidence? – “Exquisite corpse” of a dinosaur

Chap. 8: The incredible bunyips of Australia.

Snakes in the sky and snakes in the waters – The gauarge, image of an extinct dinosaur – Yarama-yha-who, the child-eating gnomes – The Philippine wood demon – Australian animals look faked – Impossible egg-laying mammals – The bunyip, omnipresent bogeyman – The bunyip’s description is becoming clearer – Is it an ordinary seal or an aquatic marsupial? – Rabbits as big as rhinoceroses – The last of the Diprotodons

Chap. 9: The marsupial tiger of Queensland.

From the Dampier hippopotamus to the bush gorillas – The Angourie crocodile – Are there tigers in Australia? – The Australian tiger bursts into scientific literature – Tiger hunting is organized – Dramatic and precise testimonies – The existence of the marsupial tiger, unofficially admitted

Chap. 10: The moa, a fossil that may be doing well.

Strange birds – New Zealand, the end of the world – Was the moa exterminated by man or not? – Simultaneous discovery of the fossil moa and the living moa – The terrible moa of the east coast – Rivalries between collectors and quarrels over priority – When did the moa live? – Toa and moa – Hunting and eating moas – Giant birds survived later in the South Island – On the trail of the last of the moas – The roa-roa, dwarf moa or giant kiwi? – Discovery of the fossil moho and the living takahe – Death, resurrection and new death of the takahe – The takahe is alive and well – The cahow, Lazarus of the world of birds

Chap. 11: Waitoreke, the impossible New Zealand mammal.

Waitoreke requires the drying up of the South Pacific – Waitoreke, a New Zealand bunyip – Is it a sea otter, returned to fresh water? – Could it be a cloaca beast?

Bibliography.

Table of illustrations outside the text.

Table of illustrations in the text.

Table of maps in the text.

Index.

Table of contents.

VOLUME 2 – SOUTH AMERICA, SIBERIA, AFRICA

ANIMAL RIDDLES OF THE GREEN CONTINENT

Chap. 1: The Giant Sloth of Patagonia.

A World Upside Down – The Invulnerable Giant of the Tehuelche – Discovery and Baptism of the Megatherium – Man Was Contemporary with the Giant Edentates – The Giant Sloth Is Still Alive! – Captain Eberhardt’s Incredible Trophy – The Skin Has Been Preserved Intact Since Time Immemorial – Suspicious Irruption of the Fearsome Iemisch – Were Mylodonts Domestic Animals? – Quarrels Over a Baptismal Name – Professor Santiago Roth’s Iemisch – The Strange Marriage of the Iemisch and the Mylodont – Is the Iemisch Just an Otter? – The “tiger de agua” is none other than the jaguar – The otter with the characteristics of a jaguar and the jaguar with the name of an otter – The Patagonians remember the megatherae – The terrible Su of Father André Thévet, cosmographer of the King – Have we looked in the right place?

Chap. 2: The giant anaconda, and other continental “sea serpents”.

Major Fawcett’s 19-meter anaconda – Anacondas do not exceed (officially) 6m. 10 – On the difficulty of assessing the size of a living snake – The giant anacondas of the Marquis de Wavrin – The giant boa, rival of the anaconda – The “sucury gigante” of Father Heinz – Lorenz Hagenbeck wants to film the monster – Would a 40-meter snake weigh five tons? – The minhocão of the eminent Fritz Müller – Is it a burrowing snake? – Could the minhocão be a giant armadillo?

Chap. 3: The anthropoid ape of the Sierra de Perija.

Quadrumane incubi and succubi – Terror in the Matto Grosso – The great tailless ape of Mr. de Loys – Baptism of the ameranthropoid – Is it an American pithecanthropus? – The brain of the ameranthropoid poses a delicate problem – The ameranthropoid is not a known spider monkey – New witnesses of the ameranthropoid – An unfortunate trick – The identity of the men with retroverted feet of the Andes

THE BELONGING GIANTS OF THE GREAT NORTH

Chap. 4: The mammoth, hairy colossus of the Taiga.

The Disturbing Science of the Eskimos – The One Who Lives Under the Earth – From the Impossible Northern Elephant to Baron Kagg’s Super-Cow – Inopportune Intervention of the Behemoth and the Woolly Rhinoceros – Of the Canned Mammoth – Portrait of the Hairy Colossus – The Extinction of the Mammoth Has the Character of a Dogma – The Retreat of the Hairy Hordes – The Presumed End of the Giant – Has the Mammoth Really Disappeared? – The Colossus Struck Down by Light – The Mammoth is a Forest Animal – The Monster Seen Alive – The Hairy Elephants of Yermak the Conqueror

THE TERRORS OF AFRICA

Chap. 5: The Lion-Leopard, the Elephant-Hippopotamus and Other Bastards.

The Hot Nights of the Black Continent – Africans Are Subtle Observers Who Interpret the World in Their Own Way – Do Gorillas Abduct Women? – Africa is a conservative continent – The mountain dwarf rhinoceros and the aquatic elephant – The little spotted lion of Mount Kenya – There is Simba and there is Marozi – A bundle of concordant testimonies – Unconvincing objections – It could well be a new species – What if the lion-leopard were a hybrid?

Chap. 6: The Nandi bear, terror of East Africa.

A very unusual bear – Influx of disparate testimonies – The beast, seen through the eyes of terror – How one becomes a man-eater – Panic in the East – Terror in the South – The Nandi bear becomes an official figure – The experts have their say – The Nandi bear is not an aardvark – The Nandi bear is not a bear – Many Nandi bears seem to be giant baboons – Is the Nandi bear a red hyena? – The portrait of the Nandi bear is blurred by various superimpositions – Is the Nandi bear an entirely black honey badger? – The solution to the enigma of the black honey badgers – Is the Nandi bear two? – The honey badger belongs to a family of killers – The four horsemen of the Nandi Apocalypse – Don’t sell the skin of the Nandi bear

Chap. 7: Mngwa, the strange beast.

The legend of Sultan Majnún – The monster does not like the police

Chap. 8: Agogwe, the hairy dwarves of Mozambique.

A “new” anthropoid that has a hard life – Strange stories of leprechauns – Pygmies or Bushmen? – Australopithecus, Prometheus of the animal pantheon – Has man exterminated his tiny rivals?

Chap. 9: The dragon that is still waiting for its Saint George.

Trader Horn’s Giant Diver – The Lukwata of Lake Victoria-Nyanza – The Lau, the Tentacled Serpent of the Sources of the Nile – Half Elephant, Half Dragon: The Monster of Lake Bangweolo – The Chipekwe of the Sources of the Congo – The Report of Lewanika, King of the Barotse – There Is a Photo of the Dilolo Dragon – Charged by a Dinosaur, or the Misdeeds of Belgian Humor – The Coje Ya Menia of Upper Cuanza – The Mokélé-Mbembé of Baron Von Stein zu Lausnitz – Is There One or More Amphibious Monsters in Africa? – Portrait of the Congolese Dragon – Is It a Dinosaur? – The Sirrouch of the Ishtar Portico – The Babylonian Dragon is a Naive Image of the Congolese Dragon – Zoology Needs Reactionaries and Adventurers

Chap. 10: Kongamato, the Last Flying Dragon.

The Kongamato of the Jiundu Marshes – Portrait of the Flying Saurians – Stany, Always Off the Beaten Track, on the Track of the Kongamato – The Reasons for a Failure – Assailed by the Olitiau – The Big Bats Are Too Peaceful and the Fierce Bats Are Too Small – Pterodactyl or Monstrous Bat?

THE LESSON OF THE MADAGASCAN GHOSTS

Chap. 11: Trétrétrétré, Vouroupatra and Co.

The Vouroupatra of the Lord of Flacourt and the Roc Bird of Arab Tales – The Incredible Eggs of the Aepyornis – When Did the Giant Bird Disappear? – Where we talk again about the Congolese dragon – The tretrétrétré and the man with a dog’s head – The dying heart of ancient Gondwana – The memory of the giant lemurs is still alive – Unknown ungulates or specialized lemurs? – The time of the giants is over – A plea in favor of monsters

Bibliography.

Table of illustrations outside the text.

Table of illustrations in the text.

Table of maps in the text.

Index.

Table of contents.

== Bibliography ==
- Sur la Piste des Bêtes Ignorées by Bernard Heuvelmans, Libraire Plon, 1955
- On the Track of Unknown Animals by Bernard Heuvelmans, trans Richard Garnett, Rupert Hart-Davis, 1958
- On the Track of Unknown Animals by Bernard Heuvelmans, Paperback – Abridged, MIT Press, 22 May 1972, ISBN 0262580209
- Sur la Piste des Bêtes Ignorées by Bernard Heuvelmans, 2nd edition, 1982
- On the Track of Unknown Animals by Bernard Heuvelmans, Kegan Paul, 3rd revised edition, 1995 ISBN 0-7103-0498-6
- On the Track of Unknown Animals by Bernard Heuvelmans, Routledge, 3rd edition, Kindle format, 10 July 2014
