= Ivan T. Sanderson =

British naturalist, writer and cryptozoologist (1911–1973)

Ivan Terence Sanderson
- Sanderson in 1953
- Born: January 30, 1911; Edinburgh, Scotland
- Died: February 19, 1973 (aged 62); New Jersey, United States
- Education: Cambridge University (MA)
- Occupations: Biologist; Paranormal Writer
- Organization: Society for the Investigation of the Unexplained

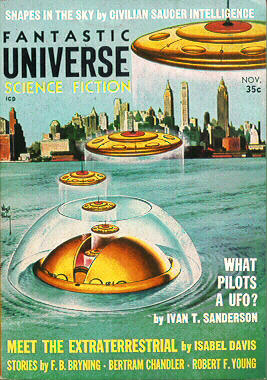
Sanderson's essay "What Pilots a UFO?" was cover-featured on the November 1957 issue of Fantastic Universe

Ivan Terence Sanderson (January 30, 1911 – February 19, 1973) was a British biologist and writer born in Edinburgh, Scotland, who became a naturalized citizen of the United States. Sanderson wrote on nature and travel, and was a frequent guest on television talk shows and variety shows of the 1950s and '60s, displaying and discussing exotic animals.

Along with Belgian-French biologist Bernard Heuvelmans, Sanderson was a founding figure of cryptozoology, or the study of unknown animals, a field critics describe as a pseudoscience and subculture. Sanderson authored material on various paranormal subjects, and also wrote fiction under the pen name Terence Roberts.

== Biography ==
Born in Scotland, Sanderson traveled widely in his youth. His father, who distilled whisky professionally, was killed by a rhinoceros while assisting a documentary film crew in Kenya in 1925.

As a teenager, Sanderson attended Eton College and at 17 years old began a yearlong trip around the world, spending the majority of his excursion in Asia. By 1932, he had attained a masters degree with honors in zoology, botany, and ethnology from Cambridge University.

Sanderson conducted a number of expeditions as a teenager and young man into tropical areas in the 1920s and 1930s, gaining fame for his animal collecting as well as his popular writings on nature and travel. During a 1932 expedition in the British Cameroons, he reported having seen a large black winged creature he described as "the Granddaddy of all bats". He claimed the local native name for it was "olitiau".

During World War II, Sanderson worked for British Naval Intelligence, in charge of counter-espionage against the Germans in the Caribbean, then for British Security Coordination, finally finishing out the war as a press agent in New York City. Afterwards, Sanderson made New York his home and became a naturalized U.S. citizen. In the 1960s, Sanderson lived in Knowlton Township in northwestern New Jersey before moving to Manhattan. He died in 1973.

== Nature writing ==
Sanderson published: Animal Treasure, a report of an expedition to the jungles of then-British West Africa; Caribbean Treasure, an account of an expedition to Trinidad, Haiti, and Surinam, begun in late 1936 and ending in late 1938; and Living Treasure, an account of an expedition to Jamaica, British Honduras (now Belize), and the Yucatan.

Illustrated with Sanderson's drawings, they are accounts of his scientific expeditions addressed to a popular audience and include somewhat purple prose of the beauties of nature, as well as humorous anecdotes, some of which may be exaggerated. Sanderson's serious scientific work was published in scientific journals. He collected animals for museums and scientific institutions, and included detailed studies of their behaviors and environments. He also killed and dissected some while in the field.

== Media appearances ==
In 1948 Sanderson began appearing on American radio and television, speaking as a naturalist and displaying animals. In 1951 he hosted the world's first regularly scheduled colour TV series, The World is Yours. Sanderson also provided the introduction for 12 episodes of the 1953 television wildlife series Osa Johnson's The Big Game Hunt a.k.a. The Big Game Hunt featuring the films of Martin and Osa Johnson.

During the 1950s and 1960s, Sanderson was widely published in such journals of popular adventure as True, Sports Afield, and Argosy, as well as in the 1940s in general-interest publications such as the Saturday Evening Post. In the 1950s, Sanderson was a frequent guest on John Nebel's paranormal-themed radio program. He was a frequent guest on The Garry Moore Show, where he brought live specimens.

Sanderson's television appearances with animals led to what he termed his "animal business". Initially Sanderson borrowed or rented animals from zoos in the New York metropolitan area for his TV appearances. In 1950 at a meeting of the National Speleological Society, he met 20-year-old Edgar O. ("Eddie") Schoenenberger, who by 1952 was his assistant (and ultimately partner) in his animal business. Schoenenberger suggested that instead of "renting" animals, they should purchase and house them, and gain some additional income by displaying them in a zoo.

In November 1952, Sanderson purchased the "Frederick Trench place", which comprised a 250-year-old farmhouse, outbuildings, and 25 acres (10 ha) of land a short ways from the ultimate location of the zoo between the communities of Columbia and Hainesburg. He refurbished and expanded, moving 200 of his rarest animals to a barn nearby so he could keep close watch on them. In the spring of 1954, he established "Ivan Sanderson’s Jungle Zoo" and Laboratory, a permanent, summer, roadside attraction near Manunka Chunk, White Township, Warren County, New Jersey.

Sanderson developed and toured winter traveling exhibits of rare and unusual animals for sports shows and department stores. A fire on the night of Tuesday or early morning hours of Wednesday, February 2, 1955 destroyed his collection of 45 rare animals kept in a barn at his New Jersey home. Ivan Sanderson's Jungle Zoo was flooded out by the Delaware River during the floods caused by Hurricane Diane on August 19, 1955.

== Cryptozoology and the paranormal ==
Sanderson was an early follower of Charles Fort. Later he became known for writings on topics such as cryptozoology, a word Sanderson coined in the early 1940s, with special attention to the search for lake monsters, sea serpents, Mokèlé-mbèmbé, giant penguins, Yeti, and Sasquatch.

Sanderson's book Abominable Snowmen argued that there are four living types of abominable snowmen scattered over five continents. The book was criticized in the journal Science as unscientific. The reviewer noted that "unfortunately, the author's concept of what constitutes scientific evidence will scarcely be accepted by most scientists. His standards are unbelievably low." The reviewer noted how Sanderson relied heavily and uncritically upon anecdotal reports and dubious footprints.

In 1948, Sanderson led a team to investigate claims of giant three-toed footprints at Clearwater Beach in Florida. The team determined that the tracks were a hoax with Sanderson declaring on radio, "I can state categorically that these tracks could not be made by some unknown animal." Sanderson would later damage his credibility with an endorsement of the hoax by proclaiming that the footprints were impossible to fake and were made by a fifteen-foot tall penguin. In 1988, prankster Tony Signorini admitted that with a friend he had made the footprints by a pair of cast iron feet attached to high-top sneakers.

In the 2020s, writer Daniel Loxton discovered unpublished documents including correspondences between Sanderson and hoaxer Al Williams, who set up the giant penguin hoax with Signorini, showing that Sanderson had been in contact since the beginning of the hoax and that Sanderson invited Williams to be part of the investigation team. Additionally, Loxton found Sanderson's original manuscript of More Things with revisions where, according to Loxton, "Sanderson simply erased the critical fact that his expedition publicly declared the tracks to be a hoax. He cut all discussion of suspected hoaxers, including Al Williams."

Sanderson founded the Ivan T. Sanderson Foundation in August 1965 on his New Jersey property, which became the Society for the Investigation of the Unexplained (SITU) in 1967. SITU was a non-profit organization that investigated claims of strange phenomena ignored by mainstream science. His friend and fellow cryptozoologist Loren Coleman says that Sanderson could be skeptical. In Mysterious America, Coleman writes that Sanderson discovered the 1909 "Jersey Devil" incident was an elaborate real estate hoax.

== Vile vortexes ==
Sanderson has been described as credulous for suggesting that aircraft and boats went missing at Devil's Sea because of a wrinkle in spacetime, gravitational or magnetic aberrations, extra-terrestrials, or mysterious underwater people. Larry Kusche, who traced the Devil's sea stories to their original sources, suggested that the phenomena of Devil's Sea had been fabricated and was an exaggeration based on the loss of several fishing boats over a period of five years. Sanderson was a proponent of the space animal hypothesis, which argued flying saucers or UFOs may be caused not by technological alien spacecraft or mass hysteria, but rather by animal lifeforms that are indigenous to Earth's atmosphere or interplanetary space.

In 1968, Sanderson introduced the concept of the "vile vortex". Vile vortices are supposed to be "anomalic regions" regularly distributed on Earth where disproportionately many strange phenomena occur, such as disappearances, UFO sightings, or poltergeist activity. The first and second "vile vortex" were the Bermuda Triangle and the Devil's Sea. Larry Kusche analyzed the data underlying that idea and found it insufficient.

== Personal life ==
Sanderson was married twice. His first wife Alma accompanied him in the travels discussed in Caribbean Treasure and Living Treasure.

He died of brain cancer in New Jersey, which had become his adopted home.

== Works ==
=== Nature/travel ===
- Green silence: Travels through the jungles of the Orient, D. McKay Co., 1974, ISBN 0-679-50487-7.
- Animal Treasure, The Viking Press, September 1937, hardback; Pyramid Books, July 1966, paperback.
- Ivan Sanderson's Book of Great Jungles, Julian Messner, 1965, hardback.
- Caribbean Treasure, The Viking Press, November 1939, hardback, ISBN 0-670-20479-X; Pyramid Books, November 1965, paperback, second printing July 1966.
- Living Treasure, The Viking Press, April 1941, hardback, second printing April 1945; Pyramid Books, September 1965, paperback.
- The Dynasty of Abu a History and Natural History of the elephants and Their Relatives Past and Present, Alfred A. Knopf, 1962, hardback.
- The Continent We Live On, Random House, 1961.
- Living mammals of the world in color: A treasury of real-life, natural-color photographs and complete up-to-date, accurate description of 189 mammals, Hanover House, 1958.
- Follow the Whale, Little Brown, 1956, hardback.
- The Silver Mink, Little, Brown, and Company, 1952. Young adult fiction.
- How to Know the American Mammals, Little, Brown and Company, 1951, hardback.
- Animals Nobody Knows, The Duenewald Printing Corporation, 1940, hardback. “FIRST PUBLISHED SEPTEMBER 1940.COPYRIGHT 1940 BY IVAN T. SANDERSON, PRINTED IN THE UNITED STATES OF AMERICA. PUBLISHED ON THE SAME DAY IN THE DOMINION OF CANADA BY THE MACMILLAN COMPANY OF CANADA LIMITED.

=== Paranormal subjects ===
- Abominable Snowmen: Legend Come to Life: The Story Of Sub-Humans On Five Continents From The Early Ice Age Until Today, Adventures Unlimited Press, 2006, paperback, ISBN 1-931882-58-4, originally published 1961.
- Uninvited Visitors: A Biologist Looks At UFOs, Cowles Education Corporation, 1967, hardback.
- Things (essays), Pyramid Books, 1967, paperback.
- More Things (essays), Pyramid Books, 1969, paperback.
- Invisible Residents: The Reality of Underwater UFOs, with David Hatcher Childress, Adventures Unlimited Press, 2005, paperback, ISBN 1-931882-20-7, originally published 1970.
- Investigating the Unexplained (essays) Prentice Hall, 1972, hardback, ISBN 0-13-502229-0.
- Things and More Things (essays), combined and reprinted by Adventures Unlimited Press, 2007, paperback, ISBN 1-931882-78-9

=== Fiction under the name Terence Roberts ===
- Mystery Schooner, Viking Press, 1944, hard cover.
- Report on the Status Quo, Merlin Press, 1955, hard cover.
- Black Allies (short story) published in The Saint Magazine: March [Mar] 1967
