= The Monster of "Partridge Creek" =

1908 story by Georges Dupuy

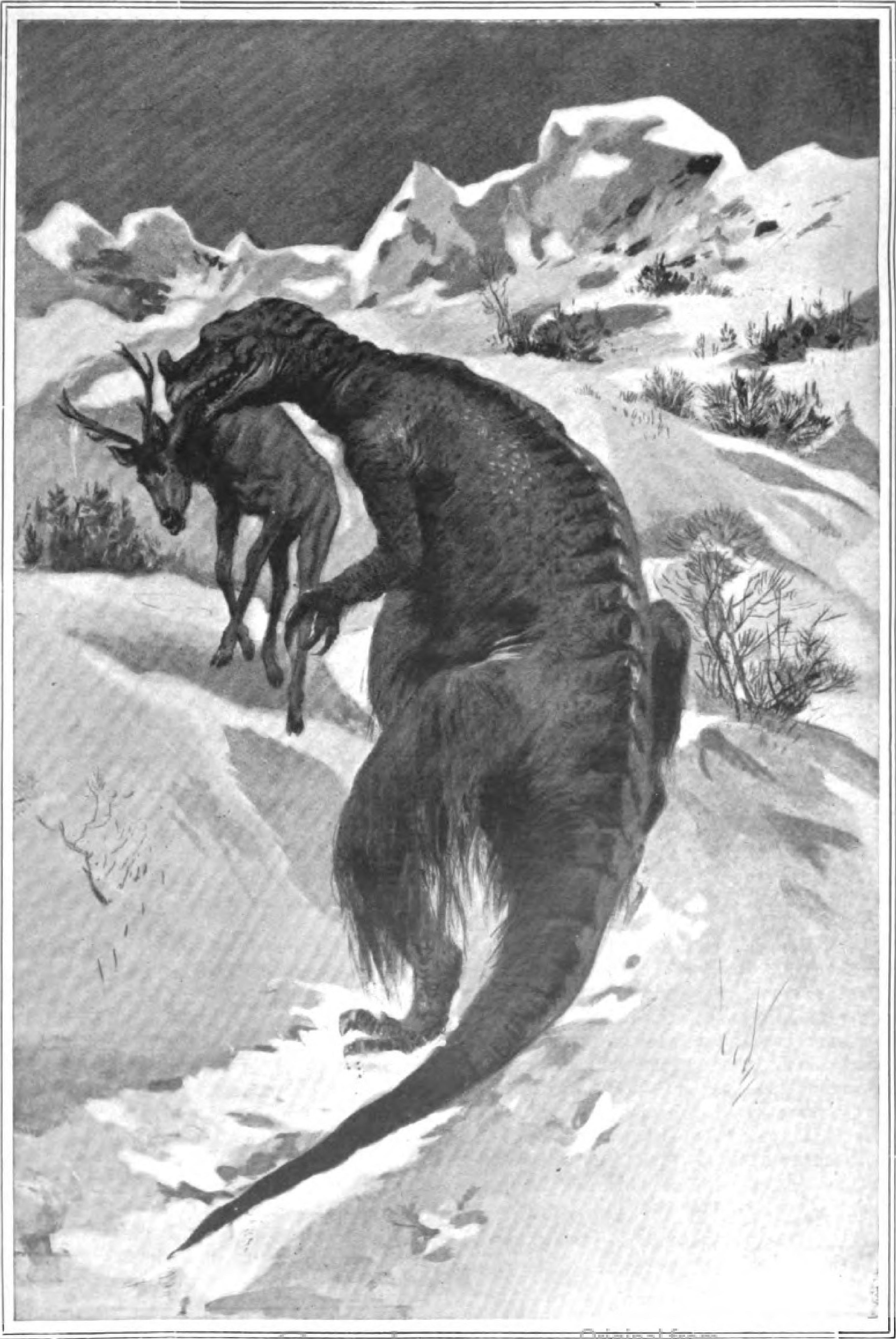
Illustration from The Monster of "Partridge Creek".

The Monster of "Partridge Creek" is a 1908 story by French writer Georges Dupuy published in Je sais tout and The Strand Magazine. It describes alleged encounters with a large dinosaur at Partridge Creek, in the Yukon territory of Canada.

== Plot ==
Banker James Lewis Buttler and miner Tom Leemore tell Dupuy that they were hunting moose near Clear Creek when the animals they were hunting began running away in fright. The men said they followed tracks, which they interpreted as being made by a large animal, into a deep rocky gorge. Dupuy agrees to join the men, along with French-Canadian missionary Father Pierre Lavagneux and five unnamed First Nations individuals, to search for the reported animal. The group establishes a camp site overlooking a ravine near Partridge Creek where, for 10 minutes, they observe a creature described as 30 feet long with a hairy body. In the French language version of the story, upon seeing it, a frightened Lavagneux exclaimed, "A Ceratosaurus. It is the Ceratosaurus of the Arctic Circle".

Dupuy's story describes how he and Buttler were "the laughing stock of Golden City" for a month after they reported an encounter with a dinosaur, and that the Dawson Daily Nugget wrote a satirical article comparing him to Edgar Allan Poe. Dupuy's story includes a letter he allegedly later received from Lavagneux in which the missionary claimed to have spotted the creature again in the same area on December 24, 1907, carrying a dead caribou in its jaws and leaving tracks identical to previous ones.

== Translations ==
In addition to the aforementioned English translation in The Strand, the story was also loosely adapted into Japanese in a 1908 anthology. This version, roughly titled "The Incredible Monster-Slaying", is notable as one of the first sources to apply the term Kaiju to a present-day dinosaur, decades before Toho's famed Godzilla franchise.

== Reception ==
In the September 1908 issue of Knowledge & Illustrated Scientific News, naturalist Richard Lydekker commented on the publication of Dupuy's story, noting the existence of carnivorous dinosaurs in northern Alaska "seems incredible to every scientific mind" and pointing out the "prima facie presumption" that "the larger dinosaurs were inhabitants of warm rather than of Arctic zones".

American comics artist Stephen R. Bissette calls the story "one slice of great northern Yukon territory fiction" and cites it as among early "Western/paleontology tales" involving protagonists in the Wild West facing still-living dinosaurs. According to Bissette, Dupuy's story is "enshrined as the real thing by certain cryptozoology circles".

== See also ==
- Mokele-mbembe
