= Jacques Rousseau (secular activist) =

South African academic (born 1971)

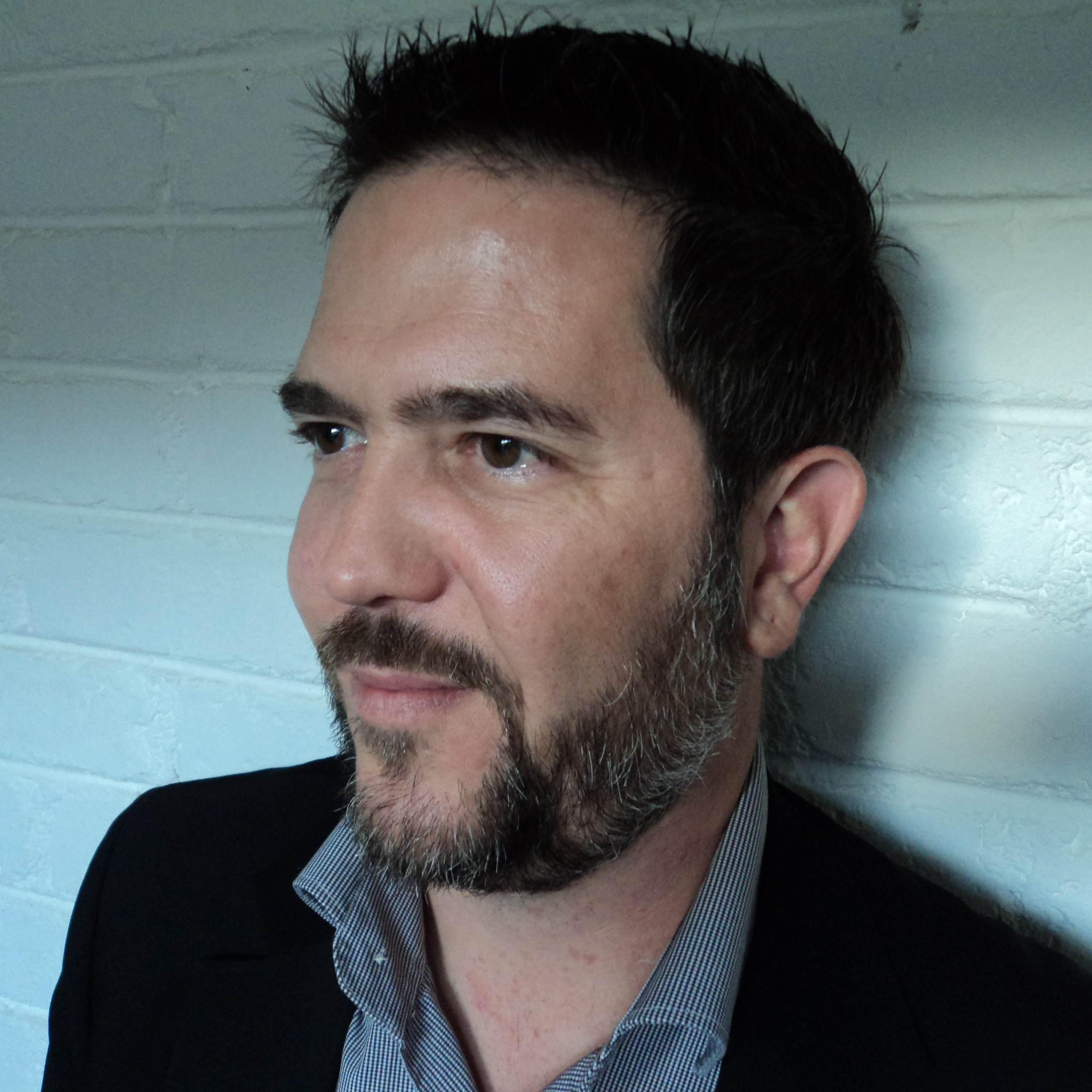
- Born: 3 December 1971 (age 54); Cape Town, South Africa
- Education: University of Cape Town
- Occupations: Academic, secular activist, social commentator
- Spouse: Signe Rousseau
- Website: www.jacquesrousseau.com

Jacques André Rousseau (born 3 December 1971) is a South African academic, secular activist and social commentator.

== Early life ==
Rousseau was born in Cape Town in 1971. He attended Stellenberg High School and the University of Cape Town (UCT), where he obtained a BA (Hons) in Philosophy and a MA in English.

== Academia ==
Rousseau lectures on critical thinking and ethics in the UCT Commerce Faculty's School of Management Studies. Since his appointment to the UCT academic staff in the 1990s, he has served on various UCT committees including the Senate, the Senate Executive Committee, the Faculty of Commerce Readmission Appeals Committee and the Ethics in Research Committee. He currently serves on the University Information and Communication Technology Committee and the University Student Discipline Tribunal, and is the chairperson of the Academic Freedom Committee. He was elected to both the UCT Senate and Council for the four-year term of office from 1 July 2012 to 30 June 2016.

He also participates in various research activities at UCT. In 2004 he became a member of the National Centre for the Study of Gambling, and from 2008 to 2012 he served as co-ordinator of its Academic Division at UCT which conducted research into gambling in South Africa on behalf of the South African Responsible Gambling Foundation. His current research relates to epistemic standards in science journalism, decision theory, business ethics and religious conflict.

== Published works ==
- Critical Thinking, Science, and Pseudoscience: Why We Can't Trust Our Brains (Springer Publishing 2016) (ISBN 0-826-19419-2)

== Secular activism and social commentary ==
Rousseau is an atheist, secularist, humanist, naturalist, materialist, freethinker, scientific sceptic and rationalist. In 2006 he established a local community of the Brights movement, which he describes as "an international movement which aims to promote the civic understanding and acknowledgement of the naturalistic world-view, which is free of supernatural and mystical elements". In 2009 he founded the Free Society Institute to promote secularity, scientific reasoning, a naturalistic worldview and freedom of speech.

Since 2008 his blog Synapses has focussed on secular issues in South Africa, and he is on the editorial board of International Humanist News. He was included on a panel of "top skeptic bloggers" who presented a Blogging Skepticism workshop at The Amaz!ng Meeting 2013 conference in Las Vegas organised by the James Randi Educational Foundation.

He regularly contributes to public debates in the South African media. From March 2010 to June 2013, he was a regular contributor for the South African online newspaper the Daily Maverick. He has been interviewed on South African television channels M-Net, eTV and eNCA, and has been quoted in various news publications such as The Independent in the UK and the Financial Mail in South Africa. He has also written op-eds for local newspapers including the Cape Times, the Cape Argus, The Star, The Mercury and the Mail & Guardian.
