= List of cryptids =

Cryptids are animals or other beings whose present existence is disputed or unsubstantiated by science. Cryptozoology, the study of cryptids, is a pseudoscience claiming that such beings may exist somewhere in the wild; it has been widely critiqued by scientists. The subculture is regularly criticized for reliance on anecdotal information and because in the course of investigating animals that most scientists believe are unlikely to have existed, cryptozoologists do not follow the scientific method. Many scientists have criticized the plausibility of cryptids due to lack of physical evidence, likely misidentifications and misinterpretation of stories from folklore. While biologists regularly identify new species following established scientific methodology, cryptozoologists focus on entities mentioned in the folklore record and rumor.

== List ==
=== Aquatic or semi-aquatic ===
Name	Other names	Description	Purported location	Depiction
Anguila peluda	Hairy eel	Giant eel	Pamital ravine, Canary Islands	
Beast of Busco	Oscar	Giant snapping turtle	Churubusco, Indiana, United States	
Bunyip		Amphibious creature, described originally in Aboriginal Australian legends as a cross between a large Ratite bird and an alligator.	Australia	
Cadborosaurus	Caddy	Sea animal	Pacific Coast of North America	
Champ	Champy	Lake monster	Lake Champlain, North America	
Cryptid whales	Giglioli's whale, Rhinoceros dolphin, High-finned sperm whale, Alula whale, Unidentified beaked whales	Sea animal	Pacific Ocean, Atlantic Ocean, Indian Ocean	
Dobhar-chú	Water Hound, King Otter	Extra-large otter-like carnivorous aquatic mammal	Ireland	
Gloucester sea serpent		Large serpent	Gloucester, Massachusetts (Cape Ann), United States	
Ground Shark		Man-eating shark that lacks a prominent dorsal fin and lies in wait for its prey on the seafloor	Timor Sea	
Iemisch	Iemisch Listai	Mix of a jaguar and otter	Patagonian region of Argentina	
Igopogo	Kempenfelt Kelly	Lake monster	Lake Simcoe, Ontario, Canada	
Labynkyr Devil	Labynkyrsky Chert	Lake monster	Oymyakonsky Ulus, Sakha Republic, Russia	
Loch Ness Monster	Nessie	Lake monster	Loch Ness, Scotland	Sculpture of the Loch Ness monster as a plesiosaurus
Loveland Frog	Loveland frogman, Loveland lizard	Humanoid frog	Loveland, Ohio, United States	
Manipogo		Lake monster	Lake Manitoba, Manitoba, Canada	
Mbielu-mbielu-mbielu		Stegosaurid dinosaur (lake, river and/or swamp monster)	Democratic Republic of the Congo	
Megalodon (surviving populations)	Otodus megalodon (Note: Otodus is the currently accepted genus name for megalodon. Older sources refer to the genus as Carcharodon, Carcharocles, and several other names.)	Giant prehistoric shark	Oceans	
Mermaid	Siren	Top half human female and bottom half fish	Oceans, various bodies of water	
Mokele-mbembe		Dinosaur (lake, river and/or swamp monster)	Democratic Republic of the Congo	
Montauk Monster		Small bald beaked mammal	Montauk, New York, United States	
Morgawr		Sea serpent	Falmouth Bay, Cornwall, United Kingdom	
Ogopogo	N'ha•a•itk, Naitaka	Lake monster	Okanagan Lake, British Columbia, Canada	
Sea serpents		Sea animals, dinosaurs	All bodies of water	
Selma	Seljords-ormen, Sjøormen av Seljordsvatnet	Lake monster	Lake Seljord, Telemark, Norway	
Steller's sea ape	Simia marina	Sea animal	Northern Pacific Ocean	
Storsjö monster		Lake monster	Lake Storsjön, Jämtland, Sweden	

=== Terrestrial ===
Name	Other names	Description	Purported location	Depiction
British big cats	Alien big cats, phantom cats, Beast of Bodmin, Beast of Exmoor	Non-native, wild big cats	Great Britain	
Chupacabra	Chupacabras (Spanish for goat-sucker)	Highly variable – typically falling into two categories: 1) bipedal humanoid with spiked spines (original description); 2) a quadrupedal canid	Puerto Rico (originally), South and Central America, Southern North America	
Dover Demon		Approximately four-foot tall humanoid creature with glowing eyes	Dover, Massachusetts, United States	
Fresno nightcrawler		Resembling a pair of white trousers, this creature reportedly has long, white legs immediately topped by a rounded head.	Fresno, California, United States	
Grafton monster		A tall, pale headless figure who produces strange whistling noises.	Grafton, West Virginia	
Goatman	Pope Lick Monster; Lake Worth monster	Humanoid creature with the torso and head of a man (with horns sprouting from the head) and the legs of a goat	Prince George's County, Maryland; Louisville, Kentucky; Lake Worth, Texas	
Katanga Snake		Greenish-Brown 50-foot long snake with a horse-like head	Katanga Province, Democratic Republic of the Congo	
Lizard Man of Scape Ore Swamp	Lizard Man of Lee County	Bipedal, humanoid reptilian creature	Lee County, South Carolina, United States	
Michigan Dogman		Humanoid dog	Wexford County, Michigan, United States	
Moa (surviving original populations) (Note: There is an ongoing de-extinction project to revive the bush moa through genome editing, this entry refers to the possibility of surviving original populations)	Dinornis robustus (South Island giant moa), Dinornis novaezelandiae (North Island giant moa), Anomalopteryx didiformis (Bush moa, little bush moa, or lesser moa)	Medium to large flightless birds	New Zealand	
Mongolian death worm	Allghoi khorkhoi	Worm-like animal	Gobi Desert (Asia)	
Nandi bear	Chemosit, Kerit, Koddoelo, Ngoelo, Duba	Large, powerfully built carnivore	Eastern Africa	
Phantom kangaroo		Kangaroos which appear outside of their normal range of Australia and New Guinea.	Chicago, Illinois Japan United Kingdom Sweden	
Queensland Tiger	Yarri	Large feline	Queensland, Australia	
Thylacine (surviving original populations) (Note: There is an ongoing project to revive the species through genome editing, this entry refers to the unconfirmed sightings and reports of surviving original populations)	Tasmanian tiger, Tasmanian wolf, Thylacinus cynocephalus	Carnivorous marsupial	Australia, Papua New Guinea	

==== Hominid ====
Name	Other names	Description	Purported location	Depiction
Almas	Abnauayu, almasty, albasty, bekk-bok, biabin-guli, golub-yavan, gul-biavan, auli-avan, kaptar, kra-dhun, ksy-giik, ksy-gyik, ochokochi, mirygdy, mulen, voita, wind-man, Zana	Non-human ape or hominid	Asia/Caucasus	
Amomongo		Ape or hominid	Negros Occidental, Philippines	
Bigfoot	Sasquatch	Large and hairy ape-like creature	United States and Canada	
Bukit Timah Monkey Man	BTM, BTMM	Forest-dwelling hominid or other primate	Singapore	
Chatawa Monster		Large ape-like creature	Pike County, Mississippi, United States	
Chuchunya		Large hominid	Russia	
Ebu gogo		Human-like creatures; some cryptozoologists have claimed the stories arise from contact with surviving populations of Homo floresiensis ("Flores Man" or "Hobbit")	Flores Island, Indonesia	
Fouke Monster	Boggy Creek Monster	Hominid or other primate	Arkansas, United States	
Honey Island Swamp monster		Hominid or other primate	Louisiana, United States	
Mapinguari	Mapinguary	Man-eating hominid with a mouth on its abdomen; sometimes thought to be a ground sloth	Brazil	
Mogollon Monster	Arizona Bigfoot	Large hominid	Arizona	
Nittaewo	Nittevo	Small hominid	Sri Lanka	
Orang Pendek		Small hominid	Sumatra, Indonesia	
Skunk ape	Stink Ape, Shaawanoki	Primate	Florida, United States	
Yeren	Yiren, Yeh Ren, Chinese Wildman	Primate (possible hominin)	China	
Yeti	Abominable Snowman	Large and hairy human-like entity, various other descriptions	Himalayas (Asia)	
Yowie		Large and hairy human-like entity, various other descriptions	Australia	

=== Flying ===
Name	Other names	Description	Purported location	Depiction
Flatwoods monster	Braxton County Monster, Phantom of Flatwoods, Flatwoods Green Monster	A floating creature with a head that looks like a spade	Flatwoods, West Virginia	
Jersey Devil	Leeds Devil	Winged, bipedal horse	United States, mainly the South Jersey Pine Barrens, as well as other parts of New Jersey and southeastern Pennsylvania	
Kongamato		Living species of pterosaur	Mwinilunga, Zambia; Angola; The Democratic Republic of the Congo	
Mothman		Winged bipedal	Mason County, West Virginia, United States	

== See also ==
- Animalia Paradoxa
- Apeman
- De-extinction
- Fearsome critters
- Legendary creature
- List of cryptozoologists
- Lists of legendary creatures
- List of megafauna discovered in modern times
- List of urban legends
- Rare species
- 🫈

== Sources ==
- Loxton, Daniel; Prothero, Donald R. (2013). Abominable Science: Origins of the Yeti, Nessie, and other Famous Cryptids. Columbia University Press. ISBN 978-0-231-52681-4.
