= Cryptozoology =

Pseudoscience and subculture that studies creatures

Cryptozoology is a pseudoscience and subculture that searches for and studies unknown, legendary, or extinct animals whose present existence is disputed or unsubstantiated, particularly those popular in folklore, such as Bigfoot, the Loch Ness Monster, the Yeti, the chupacabra, the Jersey Devil, or the mokele-mbembe. Cryptozoologists refer to these entities as cryptids, a term coined by the subculture. Because it does not follow the scientific method, cryptozoology is considered a pseudoscience by mainstream science: it is a branch of neither zoology nor folklore studies. It was originally founded in the 1950s by zoologists Bernard Heuvelmans and Ivan T. Sanderson.

Scholars have noted that the pseudoscience rejected mainstream approaches from an early date, and that adherents often express hostility to mainstream science. Scholars have noted associations between cryptozoology and young Earth creationism. Sharon A. Hill commented on parallels between cryptozoologists and other amateur paranormal researches such as ghost hunters and ufologists, calling cryptozoology a subculture of the broader paranormal research movement.

== Terminology, history, and approach ==
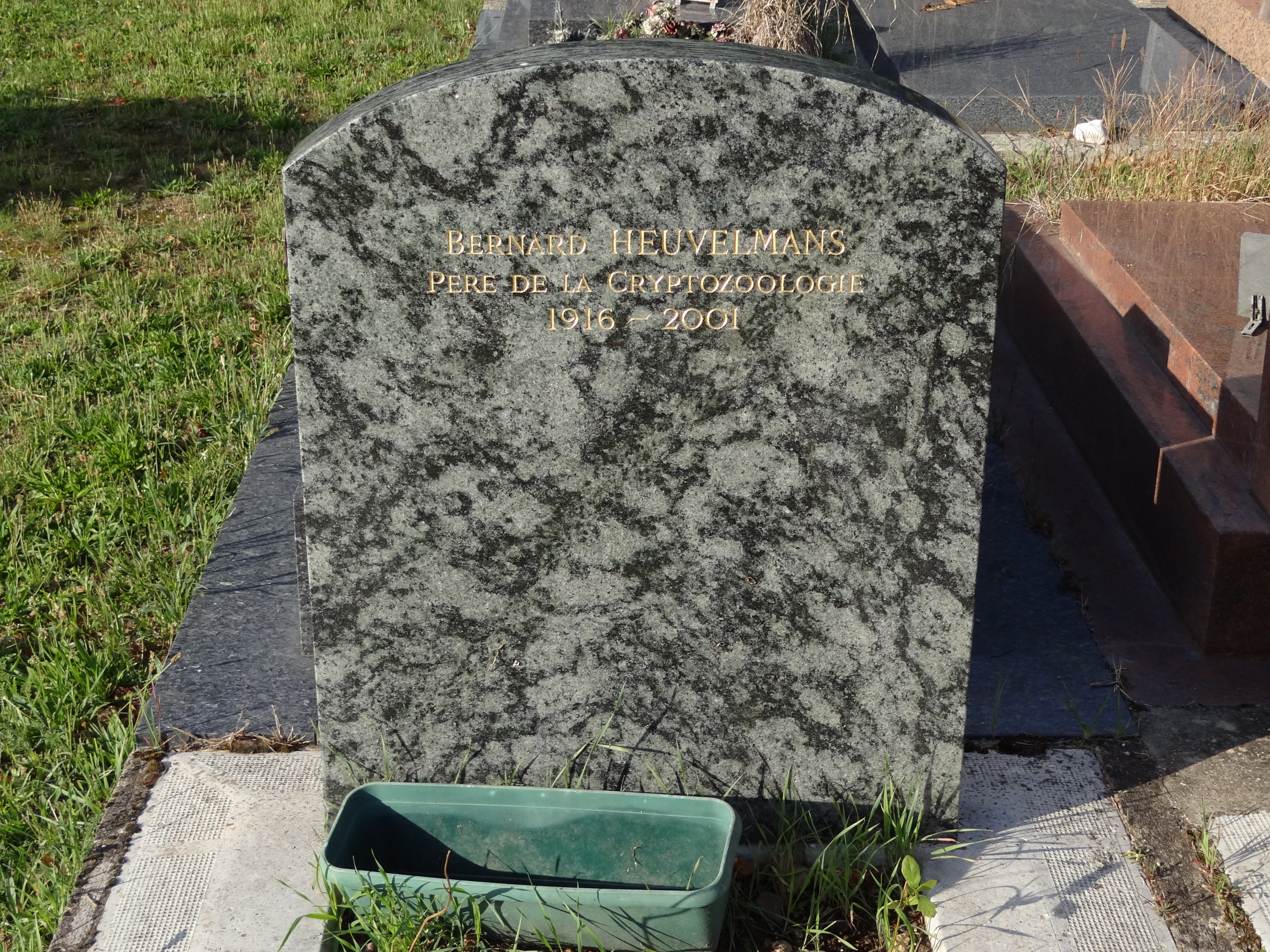
Tombstone of Bernard Heuvelmans, the "father of cryptozoology", at Le Vésinet cemetery

As a field, cryptozoology originates from the works of Bernard Heuvelmans, a Belgian zoologist, and Ivan T. Sanderson, a Scottish zoologist. Notably, Heuvelmans published On the Track of Unknown Animals (French: Sur la piste des bêtes ignorées) in 1955, a landmark work among cryptozoologists that was followed by numerous other similar works. In addition, Sanderson published a series of books that contributed to the developing hallmarks of cryptozoology, including Abominable Snowmen: Legend Come to Life (1961). Heuvelmans himself traced cryptozoology to the work of Anthonie Cornelis Oudemans, who theorized that a large unidentified species of seal was responsible for sea serpent reports.

Cryptozoology is 'the study of hidden animals' (Ancient Greek: κρυπτός, romanized: kryptós, "hidden, secret"; ζῷον, zōion, "animal"; and λόγος, logos, i.e. "knowledge, study"). The term dates from 1959 or before—Heuvelmans attributes the coinage of the term cryptozoology to Sanderson. Following cryptozoology, the term cryptid was coined in 1983 by cryptozoologist J. E. Wall in the summer issue of the International Society of Cryptozoology newsletter. According to Wall "[It has been] suggested that new terms be coined to replace sensational and often misleading terms like 'monster'. My suggestion is 'cryptid', meaning a living thing having the quality of being hidden or unknown ... describing those creatures which are (or may be) subjects of cryptozoological investigation."

The Oxford English Dictionary defines the noun cryptid as "an animal whose existence or survival to the present day is disputed or unsubstantiated; any animal of interest to a cryptozoologist". While used by most cryptozoologists, the term cryptid is not used by academic zoologists. In a textbook aimed at undergraduates, psychologist Caleb W. Lack and philosopher Jacques Rousseau note that the subculture's focus on what it deems to be "cryptids" is a pseudoscientific extension of older belief in monsters and other similar entities from the folkloric record, yet with a "new, more scientific-sounding name: cryptids".

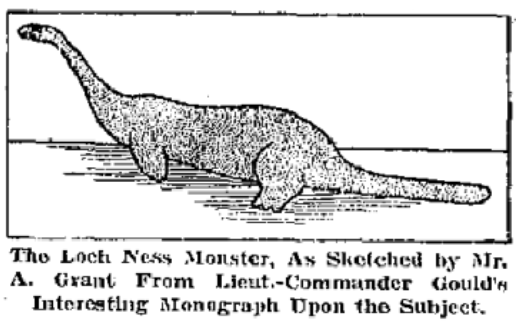
Anonymous sketch by A. Grant from a book on the Loch Ness monster by Rupert Thomas Gould (1934). Like Bigfoot, the Loch Ness Monster has historically been of significant interest to cryptozoologists.

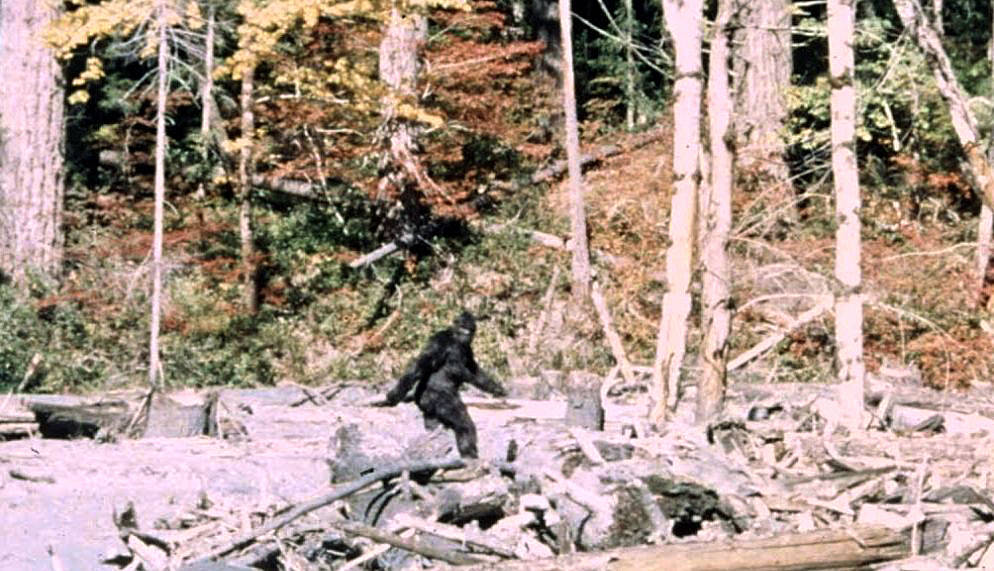
A frame from the Patterson–Gimlin film (1967), whose filmmakers claimed to feature Bigfoot in Northern California. Bigfoot is a popular figure in cryptozoology.

While biologists regularly identify new species, cryptozoologists often focus on creatures from the folkloric record. Most famously, these include the Loch Ness Monster, Champ, Bigfoot, the chupacabra, as well as other "imposing beasts that could be labeled as monsters". In their search for these entities, cryptozoologists may employ devices such as motion-sensitive cameras, night-vision equipment, and audio-recording equipment. While there have been attempts to codify cryptozoological approaches, unlike biologists, zoologists, botanists, and other academic disciplines, however, "there are no accepted, uniform, or successful methods for pursuing cryptids". Some scholars have identified precursors to modern cryptozoology in certain medieval approaches to the folkloric record, and the psychology behind the cryptozoology approach has been the subject of academic study.

Few cryptozoologists have a formal science education, and fewer still have a science background directly relevant to cryptozoology. Adherents often misrepresent the academic backgrounds of cryptozoologists. According to writer Daniel Loxton and paleontologist Donald Prothero, "[c]ryptozoologists have often promoted 'Professor Roy Mackal, PhD.' as one of their leading figures and one of the few with a legitimate doctorate in biology. What is rarely mentioned, however, is that he had no training that would qualify him to undertake competent research on exotic animals. This raises the specter of 'credential mongering', by which an individual or organization feints a person's graduate degree as proof of expertise, even though his or her training is not specifically relevant to the field under consideration." Besides Heuvelmans, Sanderson, and Mackal, other notable cryptozoologists with academic backgrounds include Grover Krantz, Karl Shuker, and Richard Greenwell.

In a 2025 interview with science writer Sharon Hill, she stated: "Cryptids have become cutified" ... The reason why cryptids are seeing a resurgence is because of the Internet, for example, the Flatwoods monster is seen in over 33 video games, but the real reason according to Hill is because for a while cryptids were thought to be real animals that some people had assigned magical powers to, and with some investigation the hope was that the magic could be stripped away and they would discover a real, perhaps unknown animal. "One of the reasons why I think that fell apart completely was because the International Society of Cryptozoology fell apart completely, so there were no longer any gatekeepers as of the early 1990s to say 'a cryptid is these animals that we are studying because we think it's got a zoological basis', those people were gone ... they were quite old, they died and there was nobody there to take over that gatekeeping aspect although some people tried. ... Then you saw an explosion of amateurs in the 2000s ... they became researchers that connected via the Internet. Now they start making media they can publish themselves ... it started to hit a younger and younger generation ... who love these creatures ... now everything can be a cryptid."

Historically, notable cryptozoologists have often identified instances featuring "irrefutable evidence" (such as Sanderson and Krantz), only for the evidence to be revealed as the product of a hoax. This may occur during a closer examination by experts or upon confession of the hoaxer.

=== Expeditions ===
Cryptozoologists have often led unsuccessful expeditions to find evidence of cryptids. Bigfoot researcher René Dahinden led searches into caves to find evidence of sasquatch, as early sasquatch legends claimed they lived in rocky areas. Despite the failure of these searches, he spent years trying to find proof of bigfoot. Adam Christoffer Knuth, Lensgreve of Knuthenborg, led an expedition into Lake Tele in the Congo to find the Mokele-mbembe in 2018. While the expedition was a failure, they discovered a new species of green algae.

=== Young Earth creationism ===
A subset of cryptozoology promotes the pseudoscience of Young Earth creationism, rejecting conventional science in favor of a literal Biblical interpretation and promoting concepts such as "living dinosaurs". Science writer Sharon Hill observes that the Young Earth creationist segment of cryptozoology is "well-funded and able to conduct expeditions with a goal of finding a living dinosaur that they think would invalidate evolution".

Anthropologist Jeb J. Card says that "[c]reationists have embraced cryptozoology and some cryptozoological expeditions are funded by and conducted by creationists hoping to disprove evolution." In a 2013 interview, paleontologist Donald Prothero notes an uptick in creationist cryptozoologists. He observes that "[p]eople who actively search for Loch Ness monsters or Mokele Mbembe do it entirely as creationist ministers. They think that if they found a dinosaur in the Congo it would overturn all of evolution. It wouldn't. It would just be a late-occurring dinosaur, but that's their mistaken notion of evolution."

Citing a 2013 exhibit at the Petersburg, Kentucky-based Creation Museum, which claimed that dragons were once biological creatures who walked the earth alongside humanity and is broadly dedicated to Young Earth creationism, religious studies academic Justin Mullis notes that "[c]ryptozoology has a long and curious history with Young Earth Creationism, with this new exhibit being just one of the most recent examples".

Academic Paul Thomas analyzes the influence and connections between cryptozoology in his 2020 study of the Creation Museum and the creationist theme park Ark Encounter. Thomas comments that, "while the Creation Museum and the Ark Encounter are flirting with pseudoarchaeology, coquettishly whispering pseudoarchaeological rhetoric, they are each fully in bed with cryptozoology" and observes that "[y]oung-earth creationists and cryptozoologists make natural bed fellows. As with pseudoarchaeology, both young-earth creationists and cryptozoologists bristle at the rejection of mainstream secular science and lament a seeming conspiracy to prevent serious consideration of their claims."

=== Lack of critical media coverage ===
Media outlets have often uncritically disseminated information from cryptozoologist sources, including newspapers that repeat false claims made by cryptozoologists or television shows that feature cryptozoologists as monster hunters (such as the popular and purportedly nonfiction American television show MonsterQuest, which aired from 2007 to 2010). Media coverage of purported "cryptids" often fails to provide more likely explanations, further propagating claims made by cryptozoologists.

== Reception and pseudoscience ==
There is a broad consensus among academics that cryptozoology is a pseudoscience. The subculture is regularly criticized for reliance on anecdotal information and because in the course of investigating animals that most scientists believe are unlikely to have existed, cryptozoologists do not follow the scientific method. No academic course of study nor university degree program grants the status of cryptozoologist and the subculture is primarily the domain of individuals without training in the natural sciences.

Anthropologist Jeb J. Card summarizes cryptozoology in a survey of pseudoscience and pseudoarchaeology:

Cryptozoology purports to be the study of previously unidentified animal species. At first glance, this would seem to differ little from zoology. New species are discovered by field and museum zoologists every year. Cryptozoologists cite these discoveries as justification of their search but often minimize or omit the fact that the discoverers do not identify as cryptozoologists and are academically trained zoologists working in an ecological paradigm rather than organizing expeditions to seek out supposed examples of unusual and large creatures.

Card notes that "cryptozoologists often show their disdain and even hatred for professional scientists, including those who enthusiastically participated in cryptozoology", which he traces back to Heuvelmans's early "rage against critics of cryptozoology". He finds parallels with cryptozoology and other pseudosciences, such as ghost hunting and ufology, and compares the approach of cryptozoologists to colonial big-game hunters, and to aspects of European imperialism. According to Card, "[m]ost cryptids are framed as the subject of indigenous legends typically collected in the heyday of comparative folklore, though such legends may be heavily modified or worse. Cryptozoology's complicated mix of sympathy, interest, and appropriation of indigenous culture (or non-indigenous construction of it) is also found in New Age circles and dubious "Indian burial grounds" and other legends ... invoked in hauntings such as the 'Amityville' hoax".

In a 2011 foreword for The American Biology Teacher, then National Association of Biology Teachers president Dan Ward uses cryptozoology as an example of "technological pseudoscience" that may confuse students about the scientific method. Ward says that "Cryptozoology ... is not valid science or even science at all. It is monster hunting." Historian of science Brian Regal includes an entry for cryptozoology in his Pseudoscience: A Critical Encyclopedia (2009). Regal says that "as an intellectual endeavor, cryptozoology has been studied as much as cryptozoologists have sought hidden animals".

In a 1992 issue of Folklore, folklorist Véronique Campion-Vincent says:

Unexplained appearances of mystery animals are reported all over the world today. Beliefs in the existence of fabulous and supernatural animals are ubiquitous and timeless. In the continents discovered by Europe indigenous beliefs and tales have strongly influenced the perceptions of the conquered confronted by a new natural environment. In parallel with the growing importance of the scientific approach, these traditional mythical tales have been endowed with sometimes highly artificial precision and have given birth to contemporary legends solidly entrenched in their territories. The belief self-perpetuates today through multiple observations enhanced by the media and encouraged (largely with the aim of gain for touristic promotion) by the local population, often genuinely convinced of the reality of this profitable phenomenon."

Campion-Vincent says that "four currents can be distinguished in the study of mysterious animal appearances": "Forteans" ("compiler[s] of anomalies" such as via publications like the Fortean Times), "occultists" (which she describes as related to "Forteans"), "folklorists", and "cryptozoologists". Regarding cryptozoologists, Campion-Vincent says that "this movement seems to deserve the appellation of parascience, like parapsychology: the same corpus is reviewed; many scientists participate, but for those who have an official status of university professor or researcher, the participation is a private hobby".

In her Encyclopedia of American Folklore, academic Linda Watts says that "folklore concerning unreal animals or beings, sometimes called monsters, is a popular field of inquiry" and describes cryptozoology as an example of "American narrative traditions" that "feature many monsters".

In his analysis of cryptozoology, folklorist Peter Dendle says that "cryptozoology devotees consciously position themselves in defiance of mainstream science" and that:

The psychological significance of cryptozoology in the modern world [...] serves to channel guilt over the decimation of species and destruction of the natural habitat; to recapture a sense of mysticism and danger in a world now perceived as fully charted and over-explored; and to articulate resentment of and defiance against a scientific community perceived as monopolising the pool of culturally acceptable beliefs.

In a paper published in 2013, Dendle refers to cryptozoologists as "contemporary monster hunters" that "keep alive a sense of wonder in a world that has been very thoroughly charted, mapped, and tracked, and that is largely available for close scrutiny on Google Earth and satellite imaging" and that "on the whole the devotion of substantial resources for this pursuit betrays a lack of awareness of the basis for scholarly consensus (largely ignoring, for instance, evidence of evolutionary biology and the fossil record)."

According to historian Mike Dash, few scientists doubt there are thousands of unknown animals, particularly invertebrates, awaiting discovery; however, cryptozoologists are largely uninterested in researching and cataloging newly discovered species of ants or beetles, instead focusing their efforts towards "more elusive" creatures that have often defied decades of work aimed at confirming their existence.

Paleontologist George Gaylord Simpson (1984) lists cryptozoology among examples of human gullibility, along with creationism:

Humans are the most inventive, deceptive, and gullible of all animals. Only those characteristics can explain the belief of some humans in creationism, in the arrival of UFOs with extraterrestrial beings, or in some aspects of cryptozoology. [...] In several respects the discussion and practice of cryptozoology sometimes, although not invariably, has demonstrated both deception and gullibility. An example seems to merit the old Latin saying 'I believe because it is incredible,' although Tertullian, its author, applied it in a way more applicable to the present day creationists.

Paleontologist Donald Prothero (2007) cites cryptozoology as an example of pseudoscience and categorizes it, along with Holocaust denial and UFO abductions claims, as aspects of American culture that are "clearly baloney".

In Scientifical Americans: The Culture of Amateur Paranormal Researchers (2017), Hill surveys the field and discusses aspects of the subculture, noting internal attempts at creating more scientific approaches and the involvement of Young Earth creationists and a prevalence of hoaxes. She concludes that many cryptozoologists are "passionate and sincere in their belief that mystery animals exist. As such, they give deference to every report of a sighting, often without critical questioning. As with the ghost seekers, cryptozoologists are convinced that they will be the ones to solve the mystery and make history. With the lure of mystery and money undermining diligent and ethical research, the field of cryptozoology has serious credibility problems."

== Organizations ==
There have been several organizations, of varying types, dedicated or related to cryptozoology. These include:

- International Fortean Organization – a network of professional Fortean researchers and writers based in the United States
- International Society of Cryptozoology – an American organisation that existed from 1982 to 1998
- Kosmopoisk – a Russian organisation whose interests include cryptozoology and Ufology
- The Centre for Fortean Zoology- an English organization centered around hunting for unknown animals

== Museums and exhibitions ==
The zoological and cryptozoological collection and archive of Bernard Heuvelmans is held at the Musée Cantonal de Zoologie in Lausanne and consists of around "1,000 books, 25,000 files, 25,000 photographs, correspondence, and artifacts".

In 2006, the Bates College Museum of Art held the "Cryptozoology: Out of Time Place Scale" exhibition, which compared cryptozoological creatures with recently extinct animals like the thylacine and extant taxa like the coelacanth, once thought long extinct (living fossils). The following year, the American Museum of Natural History put on a mixed exhibition of imaginary and extinct animals, including the elephant bird Aepyornis maximus and the great ape Gigantopithecus blacki, under the name "Mythic Creatures: Dragons, Unicorns and Mermaids".

In 2003, cryptozoologist Loren Coleman opened the International Cryptozoology Museum in Portland, Maine. The museum houses more than 3000 cryptozoology related artifacts.

== Examples of cryptids ==
Some of the most famous creatures considered to be cryptids include Bigfoot, the Loch Ness Monster, the Yeti, the chupacabra, Mothman, and the Jersey Devil. Living populations of supposedly extinct animals are also often considered to be cryptids. The actual likelihood that these organisms continue to exist varies, but examples include the thylacine, the giant ground sloth, the megalodon, and the ivory-billed woodpecker. Many cryptids are also often theorized to be extinct species; for example, the Loch Ness Monster is often theorized to be an extant plesiosaur and the mokele-mbembe is thought to be a sauropod dinosaur. There are thousands of local cryptid legends from around the world including the Loveland frog, the Mapinguari, the Fresno nightcrawler, the skunk ape, the Burrunjor, the Great South Bay Giant Horseshoe Crab, the Inkanyamba, the Kasai Rex, the Ningen, and many more.

== See also ==
- List of cryptids
- Ethnozoology
- Fearsome critters, fictional beasts that were said to inhabit the timberlands of North America
- Folk belief
- List of cryptozoologists, a list of notable cryptozoologists
- Scientific skepticism

== Sources ==
- Bartholomew, Robert E. 2012. The Untold Story of Champ: A Social History of America's Loch Ness Monster. State University of New York Press. ISBN 978-1438444857
- Campion-Vincent, Véronique. 1992. "Appearances of Beasts and Mystery-cats in France". Folklore 103.2 (1992): 160–183.
- Card, Jeb J. 2016. "Steampunk Inquiry: A Comparative Vivisection of Discovery Pseudoscience" in Card, Jeb J. and Anderson, David S. Lost City, Found Pyramid: Understanding Alternative Archaeologies and Pseudoscientific Practices, pp. 24–25. University of Alabama Press. ISBN 978-0817319113
- Church, Jill M. (2009). Cryptozoology. In H. James Birx. Encyclopedia of Time: Science, Philosophy, Theology & Culture, Volume 1. SAGE Publications. pp. 251–252. ISBN 978-1-4129-4164-8
- Dash, Mike. 2000. Borderlands: The Ultimate Exploration of the Unknown. Overlook Press. ISBN 0-440-23656-8
- Dendle, Peter. 2006. "Cryptozoology in the Medieval and Modern Worlds". Folklore, Vol. 117, No. 2 (Aug., 2006), pp. 190–206. Taylor & Francis.
- Dendle, Peter. 2013. "Monsters and the Twenty-First Century" in The Ashgate Research Companion to Monsters and the Monstrous. Ashgate Publishing. ISBN 978-1472418012
- Hill, Sharon A. 2017. Scientifical Americans: The Culture of Amateur Paranormal Researchers. McFarland. ISBN 978-1476630823
- Lack, Caleb W. and Jacques Rousseau. 2016. Critical Thinking, Science, and Pseudoscience: Why We Can't Trust Our Brains. Springer. ISBN 978-0826194268
- Lee, Jeffrey A. 2000. The Scientific Endeavor: A Primer on Scientific Principles and Practice. Benjamin Cummings. ISBN 978-0805345964
- Loxton, Daniel and Donald Prothero. 2013. Abominable Science: Origins of the Yeti, Nessie, and other Famous Cryptids. Columbia University Press. ISBN 978-0-231-52681-4
- Mullis, Justin. 2019. "Cryptofiction! Science Fiction and the Rise of Cryptozoology" in Caterine, Darryl & John W. Morehead (ed.). 2019. The Paranormal and Popular Culture: A Postmodern Religious Landscape, pp. 240–252. Routledge. ISBN 978-1351731812.
- Mullis, Justin. 2021. "Thomas Jefferson: The First Cryptozoologist?". In Joseph P. Laycock & Natasha L. Mikles (eds). Religion, Culture, and the Monstrous: Of Gods and Monsters, pp. 185–197. Lexington Books. ISBN 978-1793640253
- Nagel, Brian. 2009. Pseudoscience: A Critical Encyclopedia. ABC-CLIO.
- Paxton, C.G.M. 2011. "Putting the 'ology' into cryptozoology." Biofortean Notes. Vol. 7, pp. 7–20, 310.
- Prothero, Donald R. 2007. Evolution: What the Fossils Say and Why It Matters. Columbia University Press. ISBN 978-0231511421
- Radford, Benjamin. 2014. "Bigfoot at 50: Evaluating a Half-Century of Bigfoot Evidence" in Farha, Bryan (ed.). Pseudoscience and Deception: The Smoke and Mirrors of Paranormal Claims. University Press of America.
- Regal, Brian. 2011a. "Cryptozoology" in McCormick, Charlie T. and Kim Kennedy (ed.). Folklore: An Encyclopedia of Beliefs, Customs, Tales, Music, and Art, pp. 326–329. 2nd edition. ABC-CLIO. ISBN 978-1-59884-241-8.
- Regal, Brian. 2011b. Sasquatch: Crackpots, Eggheads, and Cryptozoology. Springer. ISBN 978-0-230-11829-4.
- Roesch, Ben S & John L. Moore. (2002). Cryptozoology. In Michael Shermer (ed.). The Skeptic Encyclopedia of Pseudoscience: Volume One. ABC-CLIO. pp. 71–78. ISBN 1-57607-653-9
- Shea, Rachel Hartigan. 2013. "The Science Behind Bigfoot and Other Monsters".National Geographic, September 9, 2013. Online.
- Shermer, Michael. 2003. "Show Me the Body" in Scientific American, issue 288 (5), p. 27. Online.
- Simpson, George Gaylord (1984). "Mammals and Cryptozoology". Proceedings of the American Philosophical Society. Vol. 128, No. 1 (Mar. 30, 1984), pp. 1–19. American Philosophical Society.
- Thomas, Paul. 2020. Storytelling the Bible at the Creation Museum, Ark Encounter, and Museum of the Bible. Bloomsbury Publishing. ISBN 978-0567687142
- Uscinski, Joseph. 2020. Conspiracy Theories: A Primer. Rowman & Littlefield Publishers. ISBN 978-1538121214
- Wall, J. E. 1983. The ISC Newsletter, vol. 2, issue 10, p. 10. International Society of Cryptozoology.
- Ward, Daniel. 2011. "From the President". The American Biology Teacher, 73.8 (2011): 440–440.
- Watts, Linda S. 2007. Encyclopedia of American Folklore. Facts on File.
