= International Humanist News =

- Language: English

Publication details
- Frequency: Quarterly

Standard abbreviations
- ISO 4: Int. Humanist News

Indexing
- ISSN: 0929-4589

Links
- Journal homepage

International Humanist News is a quarterly British journal published by International Humanist and Ethical Union which is based in London. It is published on a quarterly basis.
