= International Society of Cryptozoology =

Defunct American cryptid organisation

- Abbreviation: ISC
- Formation: 1982; 44 years ago
- Dissolved: 1998; 28 years ago
- Type: Organisation
- Purpose: A focal point for the investigation, analysis, publication, and discussion of all matters related to animals of unexpected form or size, or unexpected occurrence in time or space
- Headquarters: Washington, D.C.
- Leader: Bernard Heuvelmans
- Main organ: Cryptozoology

The International Society of Cryptozoology (ISC) was an organization dedicated to the field of cryptozoology founded in 1982 in Washington, D.C. It ceased to exist in 1998.

It was founded to serve as a center for documenting and evaluating topics of interest to cryptozoologists. The study of such animals is known as cryptozoology, and Cryptozoology was also the title of its journal. The President was Bernard Heuvelmans, and the Vice-President Roy Mackal. The Secretary was J. Richard Greenwell (died 2005), of the University of Arizona. Loren Coleman, John Willison Green, and several other prominent cryptozoologists were either Life Members, Honorary Members, or Board Members.

The official emblem of the society was the okapi, which was chosen because, although it was well known to the inhabitants of its region, it was unknown to the European scientific community until the English explorer Harry Johnston sent to London an okapi skin which received international attention in 1901.

The journal Cryptozoology was published from 1982 to 1996. The Society also published a newsletter ISC News.

The ISC ended its activities in 1998 due to financial problems, though a website continued until 2005.

In a 2025 interview, science writer Sharon Hill stated that the reason why cryptids are seeing a resurgence is because of the Internet; for example, the Flatwoods monster is seen in over 33 video games, but according to Hill, the real reason is because for a while cryptids were thought to be real animals that some people had assigned magical powers to, and with some investigation the hope was that the magic could be stripped away and they would discover a real, perhaps unknown animal. “One of the reasons why I think that fell apart completely was because the International Society of Cryptozoology fell apart completely, so there were no longer any gatekeepers as of the early 1990s to say ‘a cryptid is these animals that we are studying because we think it’s got a zoological basis’, those people were gone … they were quite old, they died and there was nobody there to take over that gatekeeping aspect although some people tried. … Then you saw an explosion of amateurs in the 2000s … they became researchers that connected via the Internet. Now they start making media they can publish themselves … it started to hit a younger and younger generation … who love these creatures … now everything can be a cryptid.”

According to the journal Cryptozoology, the ISC served "as a focal point for the investigation, analysis, publication, and discussion of all matters related to animals of unexpected form or size, or unexpected occurrence in time or space."
