= Bernard Heuvelmans =

Belgian-French scientist, explorer, and early cryptozoologist (1916–2001)

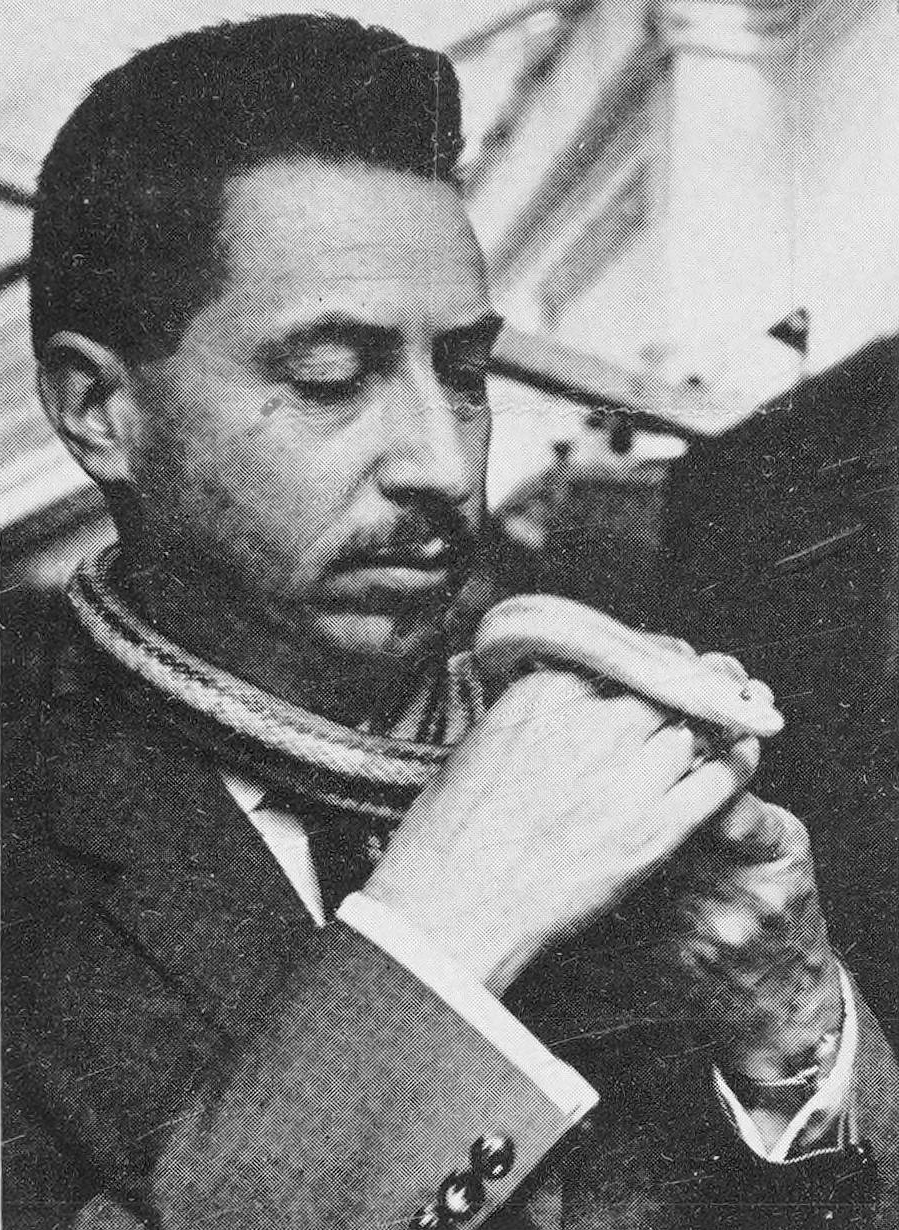
- Heuvelmans, c. 1968
- Born: 10 October 1916; Le Havre, France
- Died: 22 August 2001 (aged 84); Le Vésinet, France
- Education: Free University of Brussels (PhD)
- Occupations: Zoologist; Cryptozoologist
- Organization(s): Center for Cryptozoology, International Society of Cryptozoology, Centre for Fortean Zoology
- Spouse: Monique Watteau (div. 1961)

Bernard Heuvelmans (10 October 1916 – 22 August 2001) was a Belgian-French writer, explorer, and researcher known, along with Scottish-American biologist Ivan T. Sanderson, as a founding figure in the pseudoscience and subculture of cryptozoology. His 1955 book On the Track of Unknown Animals is regarded as one of the most influential cryptozoology texts.

== Life ==
Heuvelmans was born on 10 October 1916 in Le Havre, France, and raised in Belgium and earned a doctorate in zoology from the Free University of Brussels (now split into the Université libre de Bruxelles and the Vrije Universiteit Brussel). Heuvelmans was a pupil of Serge Frechkop, a proponent of the Theory of Initial Bipedalism. In 1939, his doctoral dissertation concerned the teeth of the aardvark. During World War II he had escaped from a Nazi prison camp and later worked as a jazz singer in Paris.

Heuvelmans' books made reference to literary sources. He was influenced by Jules Verne's works and by Arthur Conan Doyle's book The Lost World (1912). Though earlier interested in zoological oddities, he credits a 1948 Saturday Evening Post article, "There Could be Dinosaurs" by Ivan T. Sanderson, with inspiring a determined interest in unknown animals. Sanderson discussed the possibility of dinosaurs surviving in remote corners of the world. Heuvelmans was also influenced by the work of Anthonie Cornelis Oudemans, who had defended the existence of the sea serpent.

Heuvelmans wrote many other books and articles, only a few of which have been translated into English. His works sold well among general audiences but saw little attention from mainstream scientists and experts. In the Wake of the Sea-Serpents was his second book; it was translated into English and sold in the United States in 1968. It consisted of his book on sea serpents with parts of his book on the giant squid (and gigantic octopuses) added. As he continued his research, he saw the need to "give a name to the totally new discipline in zoology my research implied. That is how I coined the word 'cryptozoology', the science of hidden animals".

There is evidence that Heuvelmans planned to author a third book on freshwater cryptozoology, but instead he assisted Irish author Peter Costello to produce his 1974 book In Search of Lake Monsters, providing source material from his files.

Science writer David Quammen has stated that Heuvelmans's On the Track of Unknown Animals is "heavily researched and encyclopedic" but contains "leaps of credulity that leave a skeptical reader behind". He also wrote that Heuvelmans was known for making "overstated claims".

His book The Natural History of Hidden Animals (published posthumously) was heavily criticized. Biologist Aaron Bauer noted that "Heuvelmans's own writings, this book included, often eschew critical analysis of available data". John Burton has written that the book's "credibility is seriously undermined by sloppy research".

Heuvelmans's wife was the novelist and artist Monique Watteau; she was also the main illustrator of his books. They divorced in 1961, but remained friends and colleagues.

Heuvelmans eventually converted to Buddhism. He died on 22 August 2001 at the age of 84.

His zoological and cryptozoological collection and archive is held at the Musée Cantonal de Zoologie in Lausanne and consists of around 1,000 books, 25,000 files, 25,000 photographs, correspondence, and artifacts.

== Books ==
- Sur la piste des bêtes ignorées. Paris: Plon. 1955.
- Dans le sillage des monstres marins - Le Kraken et le Poulpe Colossal. Paris: Plon. 1958.
- On the Track of Unknown Animals. London: Hart-Davis. 1958. ISBN 0-7103-0498-6.
- On the Track of Unknown Animals. New York: Hill and Wang. 1959. ISBN 0-7103-0498-6.
- Le Grand-Serpent-de-Mer, le problème zoologique et sa solution. Paris: Plon. 1965.
- On the Track of Unknown Animals. New York: Hill and Wang. 1965. ISBN 0-7103-0498-6. Abridged, revised.
- In the Wake of the Sea Serpents. New York: Hill and Wang. 1968. ISBN 0-8090-5815-4.
- L'homme de Néanderthal est toujours vivant. Paris: Plon. 1974. (with Boris F. Porchnev)
- Dans le sillage des monstres marins - Le Kraken et le Poulpe Colossal. Paris: François Beauval. 1975. Second Edition.
- Le Grand-Serpent-de-Mer, le problème zoologique et sa solution. Paris: Plon. 1975. Second Edition.
- Les derniers dragons d'Afrique. Paris: Plon. 1978.
- Les bêtes humaines d'Afrique. Paris: Plon. 1980.
- On the Track of Unknown Animals. London: Kegan Paul International. 1995. ISBN 0-7103-0498-6.
- The Kraken and the Colossal Octopus: In the Wake of Sea-Monsters. London: Kegan Paul International. 2003. ISBN 0-7103-0870-1.
- The Natural History of Hidden Animals. London: Kegan Paul. 2007. ISBN 978-0-7103-1333-1. (ed. Peter Gwynvay Hopkins)
- Neanderthal: The Strange Saga of the Minnesota Iceman. San Antonio, TX: Anomalist Books. 2016. ISBN 978-1938398612.
