= Mokele-mbembe =

Water-dwelling entity that supposedly lives in the Congo River Basin

Mokele-mbembe (mokèlé-mbèmbé)
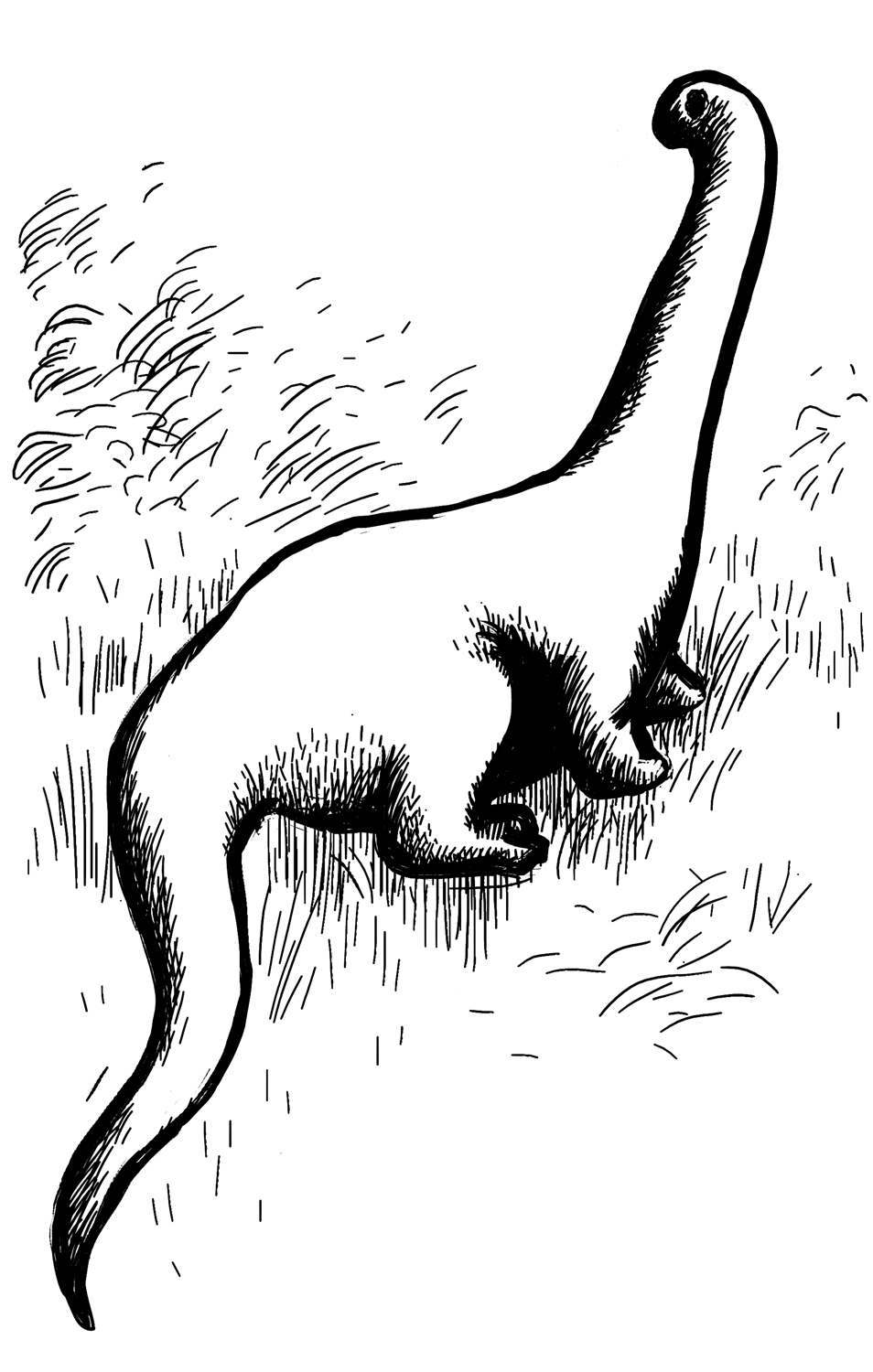
- Mokele-mbembe sketch

Creature information
- Grouping: Dinosaur
- Sub grouping: Sauropoda

Origin
- First attested: 1913
- Country: Republic of the Congo
- Region: Africa
- Habitat: Basin

In several Bantu mythologies, mokele-mbembe (also written as "mokèlé-mbèmbé") is a mythical water-dwelling creature that is said to exist in the Congo River Basin. It is variously described as a reptilian creature, a spirit, or a member of the extinct lineage of sauropods.

In the early to mid-20th century, the creature became a point of focus among adherents of cryptozoology and young Earth creationism, resulting in numerous expeditions led by cryptozoologists and often funded by young Earth creationists and other groups with the objective to find evidence that invalidates or contradicts the scientific consensus regarding the theory of evolution. Paleontologist Donald Prothero remarks that "the quest for Mokele-Mbembe ... is part of the effort by creationists to overthrow the theory of evolution and teaching of science by any means possible". Additionally, Prothero noted that "the only people looking for mokele-mbembe are creationist ministers, not wildlife biologists."

However, in the 1980s, Roy Mackal, a microbiologist from the University of Chicago, conducted multiple expeditions to locate the animal and eyewitness testimony described it:

"The head was distinctly snake-like, a long thin tail, and a body approximating the size of an elephant, or at least that of a hippopotamus. The legs are short, with the hind legs possessing three claws. The animals are a reddish brown in color, and have a rooster-like frill running from the top of the head down the back of the neck." However, no expeditions have found evidence of the animal other than eyewitness testimonies.

Most mainstream experts believe that mokele-mbembe, as reported by Congolese natives, was probably inspired by the black rhinoceros, which once thrived in the region. Historian Edward Guimont has argued that the mokele-mbembe myth grows out of earlier pseudohistorical claims about Great Zimbabwe, and in turn influenced the later reptilian conspiracy theory. It is also thought of as a "half elephant, half dragon" creature by various reports.

== History ==
=== 20th century ===
The first report of the mokele-mbembe comes from German Captain Ludwig Freiherr von Stein zu Lausnitz, as described by Willy Ley in the book The Lungfish and the Unicorn (1941). Von Stein was ordered to conduct a survey of German colonies in what is now Cameroon in 1913. He heard stories of an enormous reptile called "Mokele-mbembe" alleged to live in the jungles, and included a description in his official report. According to Ley, "von Stein worded his report with utmost caution," knowing it might be seen as unbelievable. Nonetheless, von Stein thought the tales were credible: trusted native guides had related the tales to him, and the stories were related to him by independent sources, yet featured many of the same details. Though von Stein's report was never formally published, Ley quoted von Stein as writing:

The animal is said to be of a brownish-gray color with a smooth skin, its size is approximately that of an elephant; at least that of a hippopotamus. It is said to have a long and very flexible neck and only one tooth but a very long one; some say it is a horn. A few spoke about a long, muscular tail like that of an alligator. Canoes coming near it are said to be doomed; the animal is said to attack the vessels at once and to kill the crews but without eating the bodies. The creature is said to live in the caves that have been washed out by the river in the clay of its shores at sharp bends. It is said to climb the shores even at daytime in search of food; its diet is said to be entirely vegetable. This feature disagrees with a possible explanation as a myth. The preferred plant was shown to me, it is a kind of liana with large white blossoms, with a milky sap and apple-like fruits. At the Ssombo River I was shown a path said to have been made by this animal in order to get at its food. The path was fresh and there were plants of the described type nearby. But since there were too many tracks of elephants, hippos, and other large mammals it was impossible to make out a particular spoor with any amount of certainty.

However, according to Brian Dunning, in a 1929 German book by science author Wilhelm Bölsche called Dragons: Legend and Science, Bölsche wrote that von Stein clearly believed that the creature described was not an actual animal, but instead was nothing more than local folklore.

According to German adventurer Lt. Paul Gratz's account from 1911:

The crocodile is found only in very isolated specimens in Lake Bangweulu, except in the mouths of the large rivers at the north. In the swamp lives the nsanga, much feared by the natives, a degenerate saurian which one might well confuse with the crocodile were it not that its skin has no scales and its toes are armed with claws. I did not succeed in shooting a nsanga, but on the island of Mbawala I came by some strips of its skin.

Tales of entities like mokele-mbembe, living saurians or large scientifically unidentified creatures walking around the African rain forest, are not rare; there have been multiple tales of large, smooth-skinned quadrupeds with long necks that fed on large prey still living in central Africa. It was only after the description of the mokele-mbembe surfaced that the rest of the world started interpreting those legends as possessing a dinosaur-like body structure. A notable example would be the emela-ntouka, an elephant-sized creature that shares a lot of similarities with the mokele-mbembe. It is described as having smooth skin, a strong and muscular tail, and a "horn" or "tooth". Another similar creature, the jago-nini, was described by Alfred Aloysius Smith, who had worked for a British trading company in what is now Gabon in the late 19th century, who briefly mentions it in his 1927 memoir.

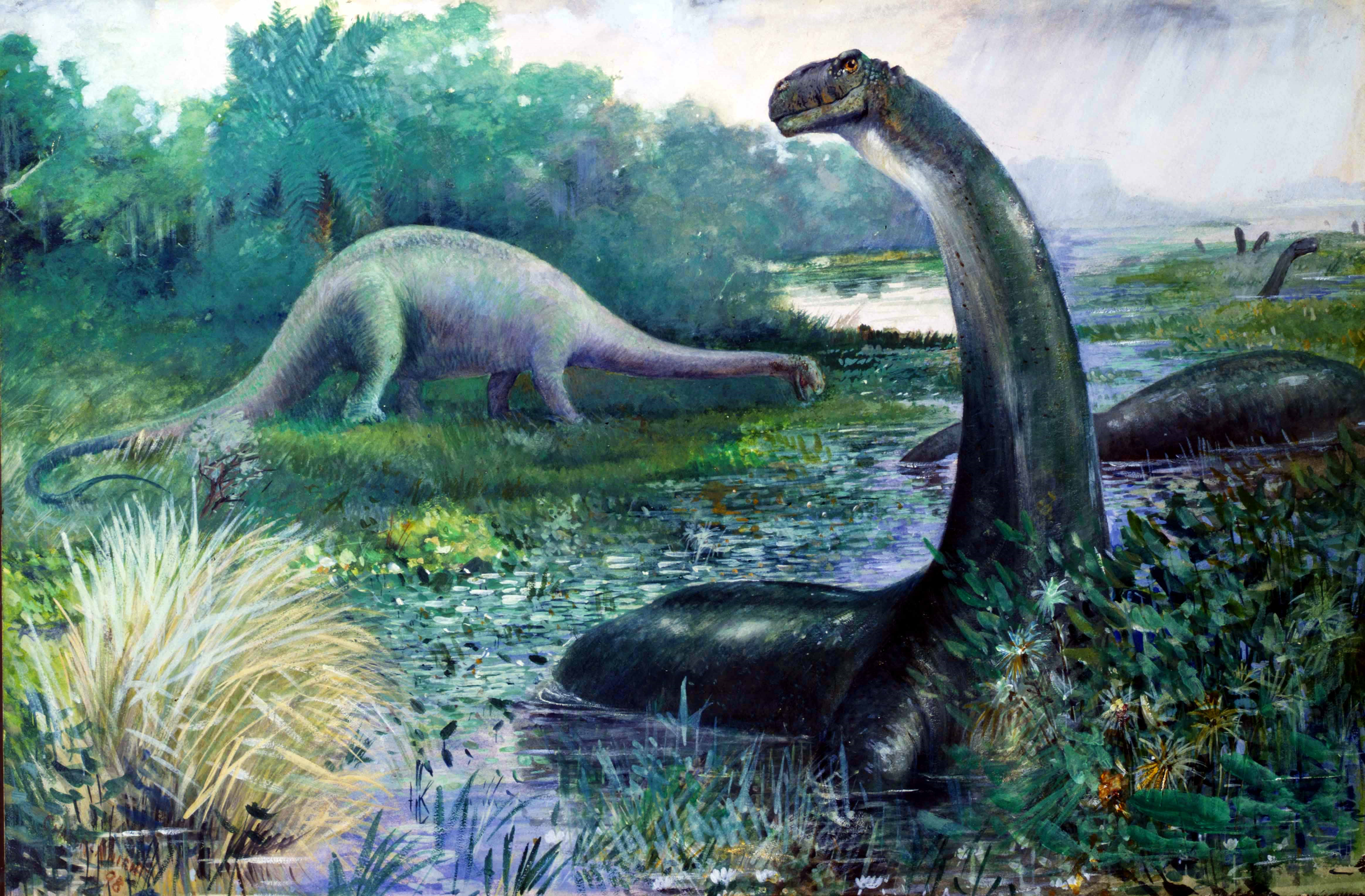
Outdated 1897 restoration of a submerged Brontosaurus by Charles R. Knight; depictions like this may have influenced the myth

Reports of entities described to be dinosaur-like in Africa caused a minor sensation in the mass media, and newspapers in Europe and North America carried many articles on the subject in the early 1910s; some took the reports at face value, while others were more skeptical. It is notable that Western Europe and the Americas were going through a pop cultural interest in dinosaurs, of which the Brontosaurus was one of the most popular. This cultural trend could have contributed to both the reports as well as the tendency for newspapers to claim the reported beast was a sauropod.

Several expeditions, of varying scientific credibility, were undertaken in the 20th century to search for mokele-mbembe or interview claimed eyewitnesses. In 1980 and again in 1981, explorer Henry Powell and biologist Roy Mackal visited the Congo region and interviewed native residents. They did not find any direct physical evidence, but nonetheless argued consistent statements from claimed eyewitnesses tended to support the creature's existence. Mackal published a book in 1987 detailing his expeditions. Mackal admitted his investigation was "tinged with some romanticism", but also insisted he had serious scientific intent. Prothero argues the Powell-Mackall expedition almost single-handedly popularized the modern concept of mokele-mbembe to Westerners, yet was seriously flawed. Mackal's training was in virology, which arguably did not qualify him to search for a large, exotic creature; and Mackal seemed to uncritically accept eyewitness statements without considering the possibility people might lie or exaggerate for financial gain, for attention, or to impress an American visitor. Furthermore, Mackal was dismissive of Africans who "denied knowledge of mokele-mbeme" or who asserted the creature did not exist. In 1981, explorer Herman Regusters and his expedition team traveled to Lake Tele, where Regusters claimed he took a photograph of the dinosaur as well as recorded its sound. Roy Mackal was skeptical of Regusters and his team.

Zoologist Marcellin Agnagna said he took a film of mokele-mbeme in 1983 but the footage did not develop properly. Prothero describes the story as "suspicious", noting critical details of Agnagna's account have changed and none of it was supported by other witnesses. Scottish explorer William "Billy" Gibbons led two expeditions in 1985 and 1992, though Prothero question his motives as a creationist and describes Gibbons as not following even basic scientific principles. Journalist Rory Nugent's book Drums Along The Congo: On The Trail Of Mokele-Mbembe, the Last Living Dinosaur was published in 1993 by Houghton Mifflin. Nugent's book included a photograph he claimed was possibly mokele-mbembe, but which Prothero argues was more likely a floating log.

=== 21st century ===
In 2001, BBC's Congo, a television documentary series on the natural history of the region, included an interview with the Biaka people who identified the mokele-mbembe as a rhinoceros while looking at an illustrated manual of wildlife. However, neither species of African rhinoceros is common in the Congo Basin, so the mokele-mbembe may be a mixture of mythology and folk memory from a time when rhinoceroses were found in the area.

In 2016, a travel documentary crew from South Africa made a documentary about searching for mokele-mbembe, which they later sold to Discovery Africa. The team spent roughly four weeks in the Likuoala swamp region visiting various Aka (pygmy) villages, collecting stories of the creature's existence. They pointed out the difficulty of differentiating between a mokele-mbembe's metaphysical and physical existence. While they interviewed people who believed in its presence, others stated it died at least a decade ago.

In 2018, Lensgreve of Knuthenborg, Adam Christoffer Knuth, along with a film crew from Danish Radio and a DNA scientist, traveled to Lake Tele in Congo, in search of the mokele-mbembe. They did not find the creature; however, they found a new species of green algae.

== Theories ==
The lack of physical evidence and the conflicting witnesses have made the existence of the entity doubted by the large majority of scientists and historians. The most reasonable and agreed upon explanation is that the mokele-mbembe is a legend based on the black rhinoceros, a species once common to central Africa, where the stories of the mokele-mbembe originated. According to skeptic Ben Radford, the origin of the creature can be traced back to a 1909 book by zoologist Carl Hagenbeck called Beasts and Men. Based on recently discovered dinosaur bones, Hagenbeck speculated that sauropods may still live in Africa. Although he offered no evidence other than legends, the claims were circulated by the press, including The Washington Post. Daniel Loxton and Donald Prothero claimed it "launched what would become the modern cryptozoological legend of mokele-mbembe". They concluded that the reports of the monster were not result of hard evidence or genuine first-hand accounts of native encounters with the creature, but rather a "distillation of many creatively varied stories from widely separated regions. The absence of evidence supporting the creature's existence, despite several centuries of Western contact with the region, numerous expeditions in search of the animal, and periodic aerial and satellite surveillance, all of which have detected elephants and other large animals - but no sauropods - all serve to argue against the existence of mokele-mbembe.

In his book Beasts and Men (1909), Carl Hagenbeck linked the legend to a rumour of a "half elephant, half dragon". Furthermore, the Pygmies of Congo Basin suspect that the mokele-mbembe is an amphibious water dragon with a large elephantine body. Additionally, the creature is believed to be herbivorous. Various reports have described the mokele-mbembe as a dragon with a long neck and tail, three-clawed feet and a single horn on its neck or a tusk-like tooth.

== In popular culture ==
- A rather disadvantageous line of the chess opening Alekhine's Defence is named after the creature: the "mokele-mbembe variation".
- The mokele-mbembe was featured in The Secret Files of the Spy Dogs episode "Earnest." It is among the creatures that have been caught by Earnest Anyway.
- In the 1985 film Baby: Secret of the Lost Legend, rumors of a sighting of mokele-mbembe lead the main characters to a family of live sauropods.
- In 1989 The Punisher/Wolverine African Saga (On the Track of Unknown Animals/Endangered Species, The Punisher War Journal #6-#7) by Carl Potts and Jim Lee, the two mentioned superheroes stop a band of poachers who tried to hunt mokele-mbembe.
- In the 1994 video game Uncharted Waters: New Horizons, the mokele-mbembe can be discovered in the Congo River.
- In the 2010 video game Metal Gear Solid: Peace Walker, Mokele-mbembe is one of the creatures said to be dinosaurs that the character Chico tells Big Boss about.
- In May 2013 the Norwegian experimental music outfit Sturle Dagsland released a song entitled "mokele-mbembe".
- The Roland Smith novel Cryptid Hunters revolves around a search for the mokele-mbembe and successful recovery of two of its eggs (the only known adult specimens having died beforehand) from the jungles of the Congo.
- Mokele-mbembe is one of six creatures sought by comedian and journalist Dom Joly in his travel book Scary Monsters and Super Creeps.
- The American artist David Choe claimed on an episode of The Joe Rogan Experience that as a young man he travelled to the Congo in search of mokele-mbembe after reading about it in a magazine while he was living in Israel.
- In the World of Darkness universe by White Wolf Publishing, the Mokole are a breed of were-reptiles who serve as the "memory" of Gaia.
- The 2019 film Godzilla: King of the Monsters mentions a Titan dubbed Mokele-mbembe, though it is not seen in the film. But the creature's figure was seen in its misty and foggy containment in Outpost 75 Jebel Barkal, Sudan while it arises and escapes after being awoken by King Ghidorah alongside the other 17 titans. The creature is featured more prominently in the film's novelization.
- In the SCP Foundation, mokele-mbembe is what a village of Mbochi people call a specimen of SCP-1265, specifically a Camarasaurus. They also mention mbielu-mbielu-mbielu also being a part of SCP-1265, with it being a Kentrosaurus.
- In the book Mortal Engines, Captain Khora's airship is named Mokele Mbembe.
- In the second season of the Goblin Slayer anime, the adventurers encounter a large creature referred to as "Mokele Mubenbe", a huge sauropod-like creature with purple crystals protruding from its hide.
- In the comic book Zagor by Italian publisher Sergio Bonelli no. 106 'Queen of the Dead City' Mokele Mbembe are shown as gigantic worms who attack protagonist of the story.

== See also ==
- Altamaha-ha
- Mušḫuššu
- Human–dinosaur coexistence
- Living dinosaur
- The Monster of "Partridge Creek"
- Loch Ness Monster
- Lariosauro
- Nahuelito
- Mbielu-mbielu-mbielu

== Bibliography and further reading ==
- Loxton, Daniel; Prothero, Donald R. (2013). Abominable Science: Origins of the Yeti, Nessie, and other Famous Cryptids. Columbia University Press. ISBN 978-0-231-52681-4.
- Prothero, Donald R. (2015). The Story of Life in 25 Fossils: Tales of Intrepid Fossil Hunters and the Wonders of Evolution. Columbia University Press. ISBN 978-0-231-53942-5.
- Dunning, Brian (12 May 2020). "Skeptoid #727: Hunting the Mokele-Mbembe". Skeptoid.
