= Igopogo =

Legendary lake monster of Lake Simcoe, Ontario

- Alleged photograph of Igopogo, taken by an observer in 1976.

Creature information
- Other name(s): Kempenfelt Kelly, Beaverton Bessie, Simcoe Kelly
- Sub grouping: Lake monster

Origin
- Country: Canada
- Region: Lake Simcoe, Ontario
- Details: Found in water

In Canadian folklore, the Igopogo is a legendary creature said to dwell in Lake Simcoe, Ontario. The creature's name is ostensibly based on the Ogopogo of Lake Okanagan, British Columbia, and also the title of the 1952 book I Go Pogo, a slogan often mentioned in the comic. Other nicknames for the Igopogo include Beaverton Bessie, after Beaverton, Ontario, and "Kempenfelt Kelly", after the bay that extends from the lake into the city of Barrie, Ontario. The city of Barrie erected The Sea Serpent sculpture, representing the legendary Igopogo, at the waterfront.

== Alleged sightings ==
David Soules, an early settler, is credited with the first alleged Igopogo sighting in 1823. While tending sheep, Soules reportedly saw a long creature leaving a wake in the water and a trail in the mud. Another major sighting took place in 1952 that involved four witnesses, including chief of the Georgina Island First Nation Wellington Charles. In 1983, sonar operator William W. Skrypetz reported spotting a large animal with a long neck, although some have disputed this account, claiming the reading could have instead been a school of fish. The Globe and Mail also told of Charles, a local fishing guide, who described seeing a marine animal with "a neck like a stovepipe" that possessed a face resembling a boxer dog.

Other alleged sightings include reports in 1903 and 1906, and a 1991 video recording of "a large, seal-like animal". In 1952, David Luu reported to the Globe and Mail that he witnessed a "huge gray thing" that "leaped" while he was boating on the lake. In 2016, John Kirk of the British Columbia Scientific Cryptozoology Club claimed on The Shirley Show to have a tape of the creature, though he did not show it. E. J. Delaney described it as a creature with two long antennae, four octopus-like arms, three pairs of legs, and six gill-like appendages with feathers.

== Appearance ==
Descriptions of the Igopogo vary. Writer George M. Eberhart describes the Igopogo as a gray, seal-like animal stretching 12–70 feet (3.7–21.3 m) in length with a dog- or horse-like face, prominent eyes, a gaping mouth, dorsal fins, and a fishlike tail; most alleged sightings describe creatures with phenotypic characteristics resembling these.

== Proposed explanations ==
Some writers have speculated based on this appearance that the sightings were actually of pinnipeds, such as seals, or mustelids, such as otters.

== See also ==
- Ogopogo, reported to live in Okanagan Lake, in British Columbia, Canada
- Manipogo, said to live in Lake Manitoba, Manitoba
- Memphre, said to live in Lake Memphremagog, Quebec
- Seelkee, said to live in the swamps of what is now Chilliwack, in British Columbia
