= Manipogo =

Legendary lake monster of Lake Manitoba

Coordinates: 50°44′6″N 98°26′32″W

In Canadian folklore, the Manipogo is a lake monster said to live in Lake Manitoba, Manitoba, Canada. The creature was dubbed Manipogo in 1960, the name echoing British Columbia's Ogopogo. It is the namesake of the Manipogo Provincial Park.

There is also a monster called Winnepogo, named for either Lake Winnipegosis or Lake Winnipeg, thought possibly to be the same creature since the lakes are connected.

The community of St. Laurent on the southeast shore of Lake Manitoba holds a yearly Manipogo Festival during the first week of March.

== Description ==
Manipogo is described as being a serpentine monster between 4–15 metres (13–49 ft) long.

It is described as having "a brownish-black body and at least one hump that shows above the water." Its head is sometimes compared to that of a horse, camel, or sheep, while others have claimed it was flat and diamond-shaped.

It is purported to let out a shriek or cry as it surfaces; a "prehistoric type of dinosaur cry," as one witness described.

Some people have suggested that Manipogo may be some kind of prehistoric creature, such as a plesiosaur, with a long neck that lives in the water.

=== Critiques ===
Explanations by critics for supposed sightings have included that what people are likely seeing are floating logs or river otters. Other sceptics believe that the so-called monster is actually a swimming moose with its head above the surface and its humped back showing as well. Moose are known to grunt and bleat when swimming, which could explain the cries some people have heard.

Another possibility is that it could be a sturgeon, which are a common fish in Manitoba and can live for more than 150 years. Lake sturgeon never stop growing and are the largest freshwater fish in Manitoba. The average size is about 1.5 metres (4.9 ft), and they can grow up to 2.5 metres (8.2 ft) and weigh over 140 kilograms (310 lb).

== History ==
The local First Nations population has legends of serpent-like creatures in Lake Manitoba going back hundreds of years.

Sightings of the lake monster have been reported since the 1800s. The first documented sighting by a white settler came in September 1909, when Hudson's Bay Company fur trader Valentine McKay claimed to see a huge creature in Cedar Lake near Graves Point on Lake Manitoba.

In 1960, the creature was dubbed Manipogo, a hybrid of "Manitoba" and "Ogopogo," the famous monster of Okanagan Lake, British Columbia. A number of sightings were reported that year. The name was created by Tom Locke, a land inspector who was responsible for planning the Manitoba government's program for public playgrounds and recreational parks.

Locke would go on to give the name to Manipogo Provincial Park as well, located on the northwestern shore of Lake Manitoba, as reported sightings have largely taken place in the Toutes Aides area (RM of Lakeshore) nearby.

The only photo to ever come from a Manipogo sighting was taken by Richard "Dick" Vincent in August 1962 while on a fishing trip near Meadow Portage.

=== Searches ===
A group of 17 witnesses, all reportedly strangers to each other, claimed to have spotted three Manipogos swimming together.

In the early 1960s, Professor James A. McLeod of the University of Manitoba investigated the creature by trying to locate its remains. If there is a breeding population in the lake, carcasses and bones should remain after death. McLeod found none.

== Alleged sightings ==
Sightings have occurred throughout the last century, mainly in the Toutes Aides area (RM of Lakeshore), north of Sainte Rose du Lac.

- 1909: Hudson's Bay Company fur trader Valentine McKay reports seeing a massive creature in Cedar Lake.
- 1935: Timber inspector C. F. Ross and a friend saw the creature. On its head was a single horn and its head was small and flat. To them it looked very much like a dinosaur.
- 1948: C. P. Alric reported that some sort of creature rose 1.8 metres (6 ft) out of the lake and gave a "prehistoric type of dinosaur cry".
- 1957: Louis Breteche saw what he described as a serpentine animal that lifted its head out of the water about 91 centimetres (3 ft) and then slapped it down on the water again a couple of times.
- 1957: Louis Belcher and Eddie Nipanik saw a giant serpent-like creature in the lake.
- 1960s: Around the 1960s, Mr. and Mrs. Stople saw a "reptile-like beast" surfacing about 9.1 metres (30 ft) from their boat.
- 1962: Two fishermen, Richard "Dick" Vincent and John Konefell, saw a large creature like a serpent or giant snake 60 yards (55 m) away from their boat. The sighting would produce the only photo to ever come from a Manipogo witness.
- 1989: Sean Smith and family visiting from Minneapolis on a camping trip stayed at Shallow Point off Highway 6 on Lake Manitoba and saw what he described as 'many humps' in the lake about 80 feet (24 m) off shore.
- 1997: A man from the Sandy Bay First Nation claimed to come across Manipogo while harvesting hay from his lakeshore property. He said that he grabbed a rifle, shot and killed the creature, and then dragged it to a nearby barn. The RCMP was called and they loaded Manipogo on to a flatbed truck, covered it with a tarp, and drove off towards Winnipeg. The Globe and Mail reported, on June 12 of that year, "People in communities around Lake Manitoba are buzzing about a 15-metre snake-like creature, with a head like a horse." The sighting attracted national media attention.
- However the RCMP denied any knowledge of the incident. Reports by supposed witnesses contradicted each other and some denied the killing occurred.
- 1997: Several reports by cross country campers from Quebec staying at Lundar Beach campground saw what appeared to be a large reptile head rise and fall in the water several hundred feet off shore. Swimmers were evacuated from the water; the head only appeared one time. It was dismissed as a floating log, but no log was seen afterwards.
- 2004: Commercial fisherman Keith Haden, originally from Newfoundland, reported several of his fishing nets on Lake Manitoba near The Narrows one day to be torn up by what seemed like an ocean shark or killer whale. The fish that were in the nets were not nibbled on, but actually torn in half, by what seemed like huge bites.
- 2009: Several residents at Twin Lakes Beach reported seeing several humps a few hundred yards from their lake-front cottages. No photos were taken.
- 2011: Many people claimed to have seen something in the water during the 2011 flooding around Lake Manitoba, though likely to be logs.
- 2011: Many sightings of several humps emerging and then submerging seen offshore at locations like Marshy Point, Scotch Bay, and Laurentia Beach by security personnel patrolling flooded cottage and home areas.

== Pop culture ==
Manipogo was featured on an episode of the television documentary series Northern Mysteries.

The monster is mentioned in John Kirk's 1998 book, In the Domain of Lake Monsters: The Search for the Denizens of the Deep.

The community of St. Laurent on the southeast shore of Lake Manitoba holds a yearly Manipogo Festival during the first week of March.

== See also ==
- Memphre, said to live in Lake Memphremagog, Quebec
- Seelkee, said to live in the swamps of what is now Chilliwack, in British Columbia
- Turtle Lake Monster
