= Dalbec =

Dalbec may refer to:

- Aaron Dalbec, American musician
- Bobby Dalbec (born 1995), American baseball player for the Boston Red Sox
- Dalbec (folklore), a folk hero from Québec folklore
