= Northern Mysteries =

Canadian docudrama TV series

- Created by: Planète Bleue Télévision inc.
- Starring: Kenneth Welsh
- Country of origin: Canada
- No. of episodes: (list of episodes)

Production
- Running time: 30 minutes

Original release
- Network: Global Television Network 2005- present
- Release: present

Northern Mysteries is a docudrama-style television program that retells some of the stranger events in Canadian history, dealing with ghosts, paranormal events, lost treasures and bizarre murders. Hosted by Kenneth Welsh each episode usually tackles two events or subjects, by discussing with journalists, the police and eyewitnesses a complete account of what happened, as well as re-enacting the events for entertainment purposes.

Original versions of each episode were released in both English and French.

== List of episodes ==
"Albert Ostman Bigfoot Tale" – in 1924, Albert Ostman, a Scandinavian lumberjack, chose a wild area at the head of Toba Inlet on the Powell River for a combination vacation-prospecting trip. He was searching for a lost gold mine nearby. He heard about the rumored giant Sasquatch, a name which means "wild men of the woods," from an old Indian hired to take him up the fjord. These hairy humanlike creatures carried him off, and held him captive for 7 days.

"The Hutchison Effect" – In 1979, Hutchison claims to have discovered a number of unusual phenomena, while trying to duplicate experiments done by Nikola Tesla. He refers to several of these phenomena jointly under the name "the Hutchison effect", including: levitation of heavy objects; fusion of dissimilar materials such as metal and wood; while lacking any displacement, the anomalous heating of metals without burning adjacent material; the spontaneous fracturing of metals; changes in the crystalline structure and physical properties of metals; disappearance of metal samples.

"Manipogo" – Manipogo, the name given to a lake monster, reported to live in Lake Manitoba, Manitoba, Canada. Sightings of this serpent like sea monster have been going on since roughly 1908. The creature was dubbed Manipogo in 1957, the name echoing British Columbia's Ogopogo.

"Memphre of Magog Quebec" – Inland sea serpents are not unknown of in Canada. The story of the Memphe resembles very closely that of Ogopogo in central BC. Lake Memphremagog is a long finger-like running south from Magog, Quebec (near Sherbrooke) across the Canada/US border to about Newport, Vermont. Nestled in between mountains, the lake is both deep and cold. In the latter part of the 18th century stories of encounters by Indians with a giant sea creature began to emerge. In 1961 two fishermen saw a black creature about 40 feet (12 m) long swimming, partially submerged, past their boat. In 1994 four persons in two separate boats reported a 30-foot-long (9.1 m), black, three-humped creature. Is the Memphre real or just another Mystery of Canada?

"The McKay Avenue School & The Vogue Theatre" – Edmonton's oldest surviving brick schoolhouse was the site of the first Alberta legislature in 1906–1907. It was eventually to become the McKay Avenue School for young children. The sound of children laughing can still be heard in its halls. Not only are there ghostly children in this building; the eerie apparition of a man is often seen walking its halls. He is believed to be a maintenance worker who fell to his death while repairing the roof.

The Vogue Theatre opened in 1941 as a movie theatre and performing arts house. For most of its history, it actually played host to more movie showings than live performances. Nobody knows who the ghost is but, perhaps he was a performer who once played at the Vogue Theatre. Or perhaps he is simply an audience member who, even after death, still longs to be in the limelight.

"Ambrose Small's Ghost" – On December 2, 1919, on the day that Canadian theater tycoon Ambrose Small received a check for one million dollars, he vanished in the streets of downtown Toronto, leaving his money behind safely deposited in a nearby bank. By 1970, the story was reaching mythical proportions: the ghost of Ambrose Small was reported haunting one of his former properties, the Grand Theater in London, Ontario and is credited to have saved the theatre's most prominent architectural feature from unintentional demolition. The disappearance was still a big enough story in 1974, for the Toronto Sun tabloid to print a series of six full-page accounts of the case.

"MIB's & Stepehen Michalack" – Recounting tales of men in black in Vancouver, and Stephen Michalack, who came across a landed UFO while on a prospecting trip to Falcon Lake, Manitoba, on Friday, May 19, 1967. The encounter would leave him ill, with strange burns on his chest.

"Esther Cox" – Hailed by many as the scariest poltergeist in Canadian history, the strange case of Esther Cox has perplexed believers in the supernatural and scientists alike. Whether it is viewed as evidence of supernatural activity, something for scientists to get their teeth into and explain logically, or just a scary tale to tell by the fire on a dark night, it is a truly disturbing case.

"Spiritualism" – Discussing, among others, Dr Thomas Glendenning Hamilton of Winnipeg and his psychic experiments which began in 1918 with the aim of investigating rappings, psychokinesis, ectoplasm and materialisations under scientific conditions that would rule out any possibility of fraud and minimize any possibility of error.

"Philip The Ghost" – In the 1970s, a group of Canadian parapsychologists wanted to attempt an experiment to create a ghost, proving their theory that the human mind can produce spirits through expectation, imagination and visualization. The experiment took place in Toronto, Canada, in 1972, under the direction of the world-renowned expert on poltergeists, Dr A. R. G. Owen. What they came up with was Philip.

"Bigfoot & Cattle Mutilation" - Exploring Bigfoot, also known as Sasquatch, an alleged ape-like creature said to inhabit remote forests, mainly in the Pacific northwest region and the Canadian province of British Columbia; cattle mutilation which is the killing and then mutilation of cattle under unusual or anomalous circumstances.

"The Lost Lemon Mine & Oak Island" – Somewhere in south-western Alberta, in the Crowsnest Pass, close by Coleman (according to some), it is said, is a gold vein worth millions. The Oak Island Money Pit is the site of the world's longest running hunt for lost treasure. For hundreds of years, treasure hunters have ventured to Nova Scotia and tried to recover the treasure which is protected by a series of ingenious traps.

"Werewolves & Aliens" – What fearsome creature howls under the full moon? In French Canada, it can only be one thing: the legendary loup-garou, the lone werewolf of Quebec lore. In 1968, In St. Joseph Du Colleran, children playing in a cemetery encountered a strange being near an odd rock which had been split open; the creature appeared for 3 days, then vanished.

"Poltergeists" – The Dagg Poltergeist was one of the wonders of the Ottawa Valley in 1889. The focus of the disturbances caused by the poltergeist (an unseen but noisy spirit) was the farmhouse of George and Susan Dagg in the village of Clarendon on the north side of the Ottawa River, near Shawville, Quebec.

"The Montreal UFO & Shag Harbour" – On November 7, 1990, a woman spots a round, metallic object projecting a series of brilliant light beams while swimming in the rooftop pool of her downtown Montreal hotel. She tells the lifeguard who calls the hotel security guard, who contacts the police and a journalist from La Presse newspaper. The RCMP, the military and even NASA are called in. The aerial phenomenon lasts almost three hours from 7:20 p.m. to 10:10 p.m. The incident sparks sensation due to the excellent documentation and the large number of very reliable witnesses. The Shag Harbour Incident: the crash-landing of an unknown large object into Shag Harbour, Nova Scotia in October 1967. The crash was investigated by various Canadian government agencies, and at least one underwater search was launched to recover remains of the object. The Canadian government declared that no known aircraft was involved and the source of the crash remains unknown to this day, at least publicly. It is one of very few cases where governmental agency documents have formally declared an unidentified flying object was involved.

"Sea Creatures" – In 1937 the Naden Harbour whaling station in the Queen Charlotte Islands was abuzz with news that some flensers had discovered a strange animal in the stomach of a recently harvested whale. The creature was about 10 feet (3.0 m) long and had odd characteristics such as a camel-like head, a long elongated body of serpentine proportions and curiously shaped fins and tail. Tragically, the tissue samples sent to Nanaimo vanished and samples sent to Victoria were wrongly identified by curator Francis Kermode, and so the only tangible proof of these previously legendary animals was lost forever. However two sets of the photographs were discovered of the Cadborosaurus by Captain William Hagelund, who published them in his book "Whalers No More".

"Occult Crimes" – Sandy Charles, who was institutionalized in 1995 after being found not criminally responsible for the slaying of a seven-year-old boy, cut and cooked strips of flesh and fat from the boy's body in a ritual he said was inspired by the movie "Warlock." Adolfo De Jesus Constanzo, Mexican cult leader also known as El Padrino. When police raided his ranch they discovered the malodorous shed where Constanzo kept his nganga. Captive cult members directed searchers to Constanzo's private cemetery, and excavation began revealing 15 mutilated corpses by April 16, 1989, including American student Mark Kilroy.

"The Possession of Maurice Theriault" – As a child Maurice "Frenchy" Theriault lived a hard New England life, suffering long hours working on his family farm and dealing with his father's abusive attitude, becoming more and more violent towards his son as he became older. Frenchy began to ask for help, calling upon anyone who would help him, even unknowingly asking Satan to help him. It was also during this time that he witnessed something horrific in the farm's barn that is never explained fully but which is only hinted at as involving sex of some kind. Frenchy was forced to watch and participate in acts. Frenchy began to notice differences in himself. He had increased strength, knowledge of things he had never learned. He eventually left and floated around New England for years. In the spring of 1985 the town noticed something unusual going on with Frenchy. Blood would randomly appear in the house and on Frenchy. His unusual strength continued. The most disturbing activity was Frenchy's bi-location. It was decided that this was a case of possession, and Bishop Robert McKenna was called in and agreed to perform an exorcism. The exorcism was successful. There are still questions about what happened on the farm in Northern Maine.

== Cast and crew ==
- Producers: Roberto Luca, Jean Leclerc
- Directors: Éric Santerre, Jean Leclerc
- Scriptwriters: Christian Page, Jean Leclerc
- Lead Actor: Martina Adamcova
