= Escarpment Trail Race =

Race on New York's Escarpment Trail

Escarpment Trail Run
- Date: Last Sunday in July
- Location: Catskill Mountains, New York, U.S.
- Distance: 30 km (19 mi)
- Established: 1977
- Organizer: Escarpment Adventures, Inc.
- Website: escarpmenttrail.com

The Escarpment Trail Run is a 30 km (19 mi) point-to-point mountain race held annually since 1977 on the Escarpment Trail in New York's Catskill Mountains. Albany newspaper the Times Union calls it "the Catskills' most grueling trail race," and Runner's World lists it among the East Coast's classic technical events.

== History ==
Local runner and ski patroller Dick Vincent launched the race on 31 July 1977 with 22 starters. It is said to be one of the oldest trail runs in the New York area. A detailed retrospective in the Pace Setter running journal recounts its early years, when entrants carried wine-skins instead of hydration packs. The field now caps at approximately 275 and fills by lottery. As of 2019, Ben Nephew had won the race 13 times and other notable winners include Lee Berube.
