= Gougou =

Mythical creature in Canada

The Gougou is one of the oldest Mi'kmaq legends in Canadian folklore. It is said to be ogress that lives on Miscou Island, located in northeast New Brunswick in the Gulf of St. Lawrence. It was mentioned by Samuel de Champlain when writing about his exploration of the area in 1603. William F. Ganong made attempts to uncover the legend when surveying the area in 1903.
