= Seelkee =

British Columbian lake monster

Creature information
- Other name(s): Seelkee, S’í:lhqey, Si'xqe, Shla- lah-kum, Su'ike, Ts'ewalf
- Sub grouping: Lake monster

Origin
- Country: Canada
- Region: Chilliwack, British Columbia
- Habitat: Water

In Canadian folklore, Seelkee (transcribed in English from Halqemeylem, the local indigenous language) is a lake monster reported to have lived in the swamps of what is now Chilliwack, in British Columbia, Canada. Seelkee has been allegedly seen by the Stó:lō, First Nations, people for hundreds of years. The most common description of Seelkee is a 10- to 15-foot-long (3.0 to 4.6 m) sea serpent-like beast with the head of a horse.

Descriptions often portray the creature as snake-like with two heads. Furthermore, the coloration has been described as mostly black with red circular designs. Some of the longhouses in the local Stó:lō villages were defined by large house posts with Seelkee designs accented with red paint. Although some modern longhouses were built with gabled roofs, most Stó:lō longhouses were built similarly to the Xá:ytem Longhouse with a single flat, slanted roof. Acting as the primary summer shelters for the Stó:lō people, entire extended families could live in a longhouse, with the structure capable of being extended as the family expanded.

One of the first Caucasian settlers of the region, Issac Kipp, reportly saw a Seelkee and related that he was told by the local Sto:lo people never to turn your back on the beast. Saying "Don't turn around, if you do you'll be sick."

== See also ==
- Igopogo, said to live in Lake Simcoe, Ontario
- Loch Ness Monster
- Ogopogo, said to live in Okanagan Lake, BC
- Memphre, said to live in Lake Memphremagog, Quebec
- List of reported lake monsters
- Selkie, a similar named creature

== Bibliography ==
Notes

References

- Carlson, Keith; McHalsie, Albert Jules (2001). A Stó:lō-Coast Salish Historical Atlas. Vancouver, Seattle, Chilliwack: Douglas & McIntyre. ISBN 9781550548129. OCLC 44940929. - Total pages: 208
- Eberhart, George M. (2002). Mysterious Creatures: N-Z. ABC-CLIO. ISBN 9781576072837. - Total pages: 722
- Wells, Oliver N.; Maud, Ralph; Galloway, Brent Douglas; Weeden, Marie (1987). The Chilliwacks and Their Neighbors. Vancouver: Talonbooks. ISBN 9780889222557. OCLC 18907171. - Total pages: 226
- Wells, Oliver (1970). Myths and Legends: STAW-loh Indians of South Western British Columbia. Mrs. R. P. Weeden. - Total pages: 42
