= Memphre =

Legendary lake monster of Lake Memphremagog

Memphré
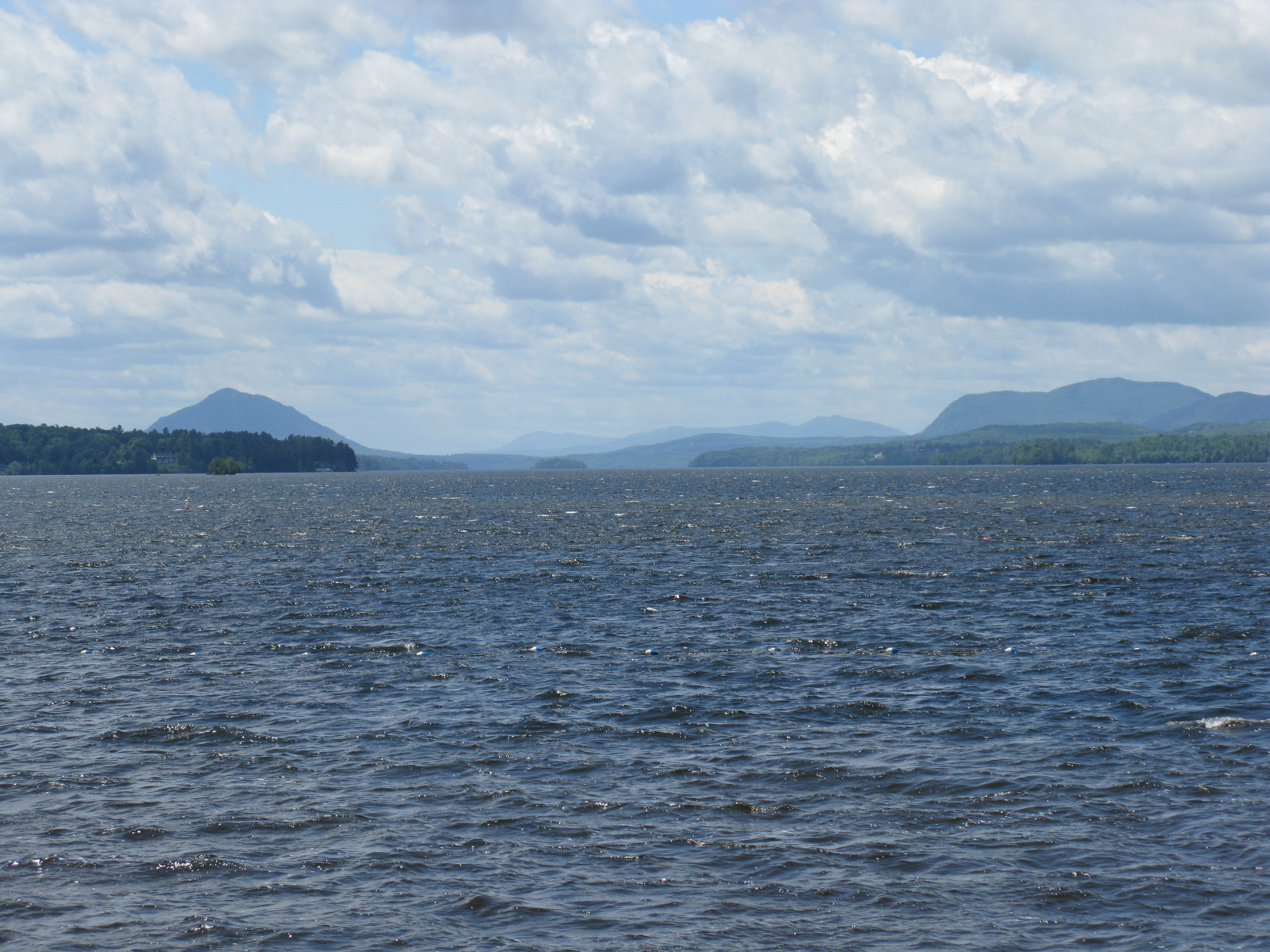
- Lake Memphremagog

Creature information
- Other name: Lake Memphremagog Monster
- Sub grouping: Lake Monster

Origin
- First attested: 1816
- Country: Canada
- Region: Lake Memphremagog, Quebec
- Details: Found in water

In Canadian folklore, Memphré is a lake monster said to live in Lake Memphremagog, a fresh water glacial lake located between Newport, Vermont, United States and Magog, Quebec, Canada.

== Background ==
Lake Memphremagog stretches for 40 kilometres (25 mi), with a mean depth of 15.5 metres (51 ft) and a deepest point at 107 metres (351 ft). It was formed by melting glaciers 10,000 years ago, during the last ice-age. The lake freezes over each winter, often becoming up to 1 m (3 ft 3 in) thick.

== History ==
Memphré is often described much like the Loch Ness Monster. While the existence of Memphré and most other lake monsters is treated skeptically by the scientific community, reports of sightings persist, with the last in 2005.

=== Coin ===
In August 2011, an artistic impression of Memphré was featured on a coloured Canadian quarter.

== See also ==
- Ogopogo, reported to live in Okanagan Lake, in British Columbia, Canada
- Manipogo, said to live in Lake Manitoba, Manitoba
- Champ, reported to live in Lake Champlain, between New York, Vermont and Quebec
- Seelkee, said to live in the swamps of what is now Chilliwack, in British Columbia
