= Folklore of Quebec =

Quebec has a rich history of folklore.

== Folk tales ==
Folktales were told by Raconteurs, who could tell tales lasting several hours, or even tell a story over the course of several evenings. Christian beliefs and superstitions are present in most Quebec folklore. La chasse-galerie (the flying canoe) is a well-known folktale about a group of lumberjacks who make a pact with the devil. Demons, witches, and werewolves were common folk motifs. The tales themselves were referred to by the name contes. The traditional conte form of story-telling has been adapted to the modern novel by writers such as Roch Carrier and Joseph Jean Jacques Ferron. Some folktales are classified under the traditional genre Märchen (fairy tales).

The Devil at the Dance is an example in which the Devil was used to reinforce Christian ideals. It is the story of a young couple in love. The girl's parents, who are Heretics, refuse the young man as a suitor after discovering he is Christian. When the daughter protests, her mother announces that she would rather have the Devil himself courting her daughter than the young Christian. The following Sunday afternoon, a stranger comes to call: the Devil himself. The three of them– mother, father and daughter, are converted by a priest, and the young couple are then married.

There are various versions of this tale: One paints the young girl as being very disobedient and flirtatious. Although her parents warn her of the evils of selfishness, her actions do not change. Thus, the Devil was able to enter her home because of her Unchristian behavior. She is saved once again by the Priest, and converts to Christianity. Another version has the tale happening in a remote village in New Brunswick, but with the same basic storyline. Clearly, the tale evolved depending on what message the storyteller was trying to portray. Regardless of the version, the vast influence of the Catholic Church is clearly noticeable.

=== Lumberjack heroes ===
A number of lumberjack heroes were made famous through stories told by itinerant lumberjacks throughout Central Canada and the northern United States. These lumberjack heroes were of French-Canadian origin, and became the basis for many Paul Bunyan stories. They include tales about Joseph Montferrand ("Joe Muffreau" or "Big Joe Mufferaw"), Julius Neville, Louis Cyr, and Napoleon La Rue.

== Superstitions ==
Other aspects of Quebec folklore include superstitions surrounding objects, events, and dreams. In essence, these stem from the belief in both white magic and black magic, where the former is seen to be beneficial and seeks to bring about positive outcomes, and the latter being essentially malicious, sinister, and all-around evil (sometimes also called witchcraft). Although Christianity had slowly chipped away at most forms of magic, the populace still held on to its various superstitions for generations. Where religion provides Quebec with a societal structure, these beliefs sought to predict the future, to help alleviate fear of the unknown.

Listed below are objects along with a brief description of the superstition associated with them.

- Age: A woman, regardless of marital status, will experience an important event during the year following her 31st birthday.
- Bonhomme sept-heures: This man is said to kidnap children who are out of bed after seven o'clock at night. He hides underneath balconies and, equipped with a mask and a bag in which to dispose the children, enters a home after the clock strikes seven.
- Freckles: Having freckles on your arms is a sign of sensuality.
- Hairbrush: If a young woman drops her hairbrush, she'll lose her fiancé.
- Needle:
  - If you lose your needle, you will also lose your horse.
  - If you drop a needle and it sticks itself into the ground, then someone is thinking ill of you.
- Stars: Count nine stars nine nights in a row, and the last star will point towards your future husband.

== Research ==
Interest in researching and classifying folklore began during the late 19th century. Marius Barbeau established himself as one of Canada's foremost folklorists during the early 20th century. Luc Lacourcière founded the Folklore Archives at Laval University in Quebec City. Laval University offers an academic folklore studies program. The Folklore Studies Association of Canada has also done extensive work related to preserving Quebec folklore.

The Association Québécoise des Loisirs Folkloriques, based in Montreal, runs a number of programs for the public year-round, as well as publishing literature and recordings of folklore. The Canadian Museum of History in Gatineau, the McCord Museum in Montreal, and the Musée Pop in Trois-Rivières have extensive holdings related to Quebec folklore and folk artifacts.

== See also ==
- Dalbec (folklore)
- Canadian folklore
- French folklore
