= Ogopogo =

Creature in First Nations folklore and alleged lake monster

Coordinates: 49°32′50″N 119°35′44″W

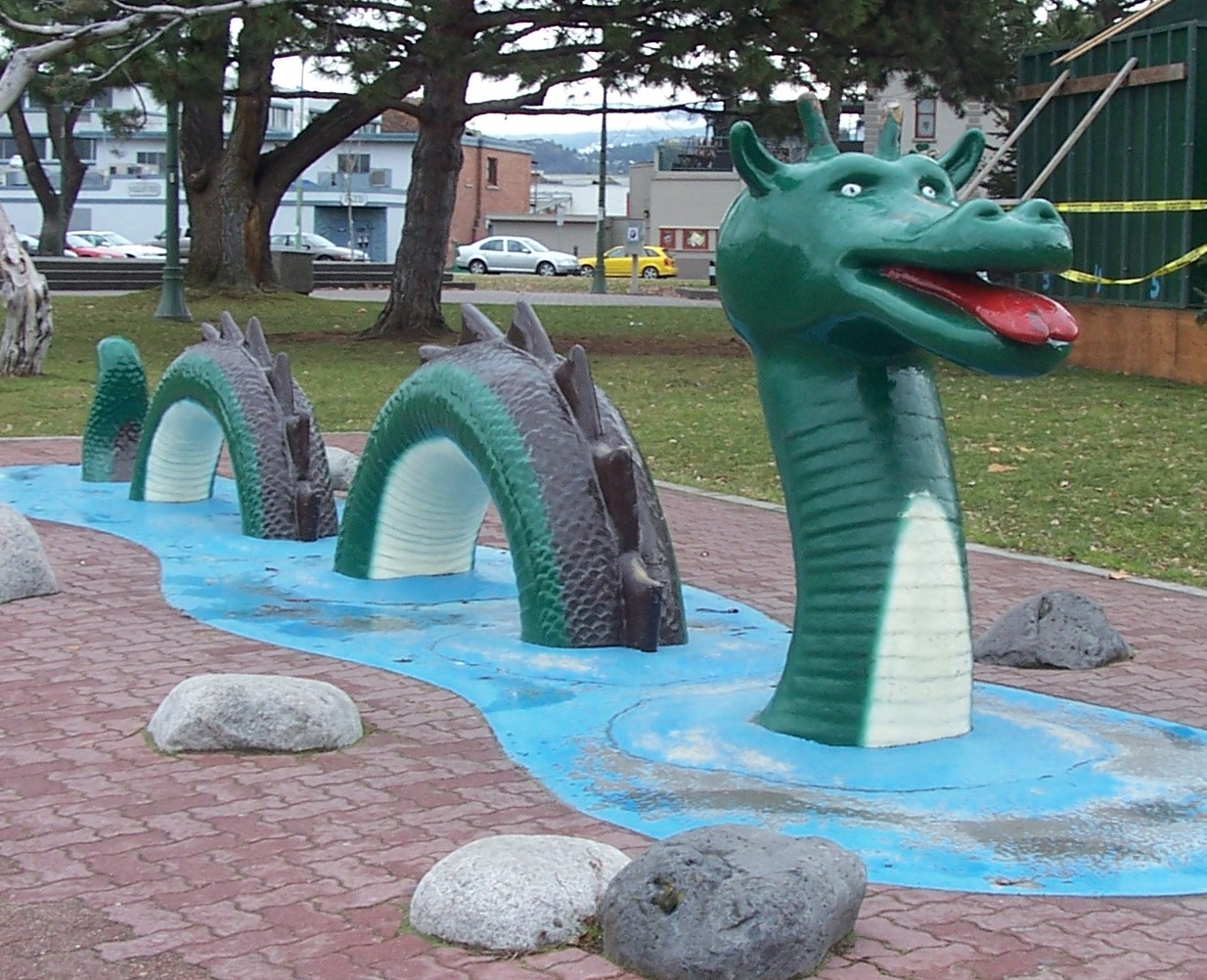
- Ogopogo-themed play structure in Kelowna, British Columbia

Creature information
- Other name(s): Nx̌ax̌aitkʷ, N'ha·a·itk, Naitaka
- Sub grouping: Lake monster
- Similar entities: Loch Ness Monster, Champ, Altamaha-ha, Nahuelito

Origin
- Country: Canada
- Region: Okanagan Lake, British Columbia
- Habitat: Water

The Ogopogo is a lake monster in Canadian folklore said to inhabit Okanagan Lake in the province of British Columbia. Some scholars have charted the entity's development from First Nations tradition as well as motifs found in widespread water monster legends. The Ogopogo now plays a role in the commercial symbolism and media representation of the region.

== Background ==
Okanagan Lake is the largest of five interconnected freshwater fjord lakes in the Okanagan Valley in British Columbia. Named after the Syilx Okanagan Nation that have lived in the valley since time immemorial, it was created when melting glaciers flooded a valley 10,000 years ago. It stretches for 127.1 kilometres (79.0 miles), with a maximum depth of 232.3 metres (762 feet) and an average depth of 75.9 metres (249 feet). Okanagan has frozen over during eight winters in the last 110 years.

The purported lake monster has been generally described as resembling a serpentine creature with smooth, dark skin that possesses a massive body measuring up to 15 m (49 ft) in length with a thickness exceeding that of a telephone pole. The creature reportedly moves at a rapid speed, coiling itself in vertical undulations, and propelling its mass forward with a powerful tail. Comparisons have been drawn to descriptions of another British Columbian cryptid, Cadborosaurus, or the extinct Basilosaurus.

== Etymology ==
"The Ogo-Pogo: The Funny Fox-Trot"
"The Ogo-Pogo: The Funny Fox-Trot"

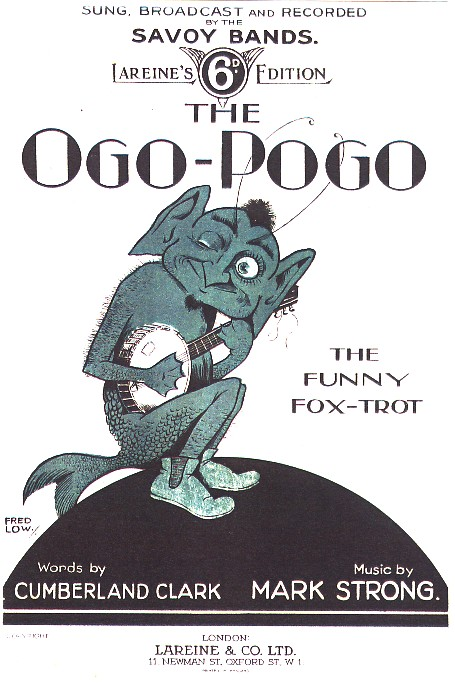
Sheet music cover

According to historian Mark M. Orkin, the creature received its colonial name "on a night in 1924 when the strains of an English music-hall song were first heard in the city of Vernon, British Columbia". Orkin cites the following lines from the song:

His mother was an earwig,
His father was a whale;
A little bit of head
And hardly any tail—
And Ogopogo was his name.

Orkin, however, notes that "A somewhat different version of the song appeared in the Vancouver Province, August 24, 1926. According to the DC the name was first applied in 1912." Additionally, the creature may sometimes be referred to by the pet name Oggy. Orkin points out that the word Ogopogo is a palindrome, and asserts that part of the creature's lore includes the suggestion that it similarly "appears the same when looked at from either end." Smaller creatures may be referred to as Ogopups.

== History ==
=== Native origins ===
Rattlesnake Island, a protected area where Okanagan legends claimed N'ha-a-itk lived

According to skeptic Benjamin Radford, the Ogopogo is "more closely tied to native myths than is any other lake monster." The Secwepemc and Syilx natives regarded the Ogopogo, which they called the Naitaka, as "an evil supernatural entity with great power and ill intent." The word "n'ha-a-itk" has various translations, such as "water-demon", "water god", or "sacred creature of the water". In Native lore, Naitaka demanded a live sacrifice for safe crossing of the lake. For hundreds of years, First Nations would sacrifice small animals before entering the water. Oral traditions often described visiting chief Timbasket, who rejected the required sacrifice, denying the existence of the demon. Upon entering the water on a canoe with his family, Naitaka "whipped up the surface of the lake with his long tail" and the canoe and its occupants were sucked to the bottom of the lake. The Naitaka was often described as using its tail to create fierce storms to drown victims. In 1855, settler John MacDougal claimed that his horses were sucked down into the water. He went on to assert that his canoe almost met the same fate, but that he had managed to cut the line.

According to Pat Raphael of the Westbank First Nation, a member nation of the larger Okanagan Nation Alliance, the demonic view of Naitaka came about through miscommunication between Canada's early European settlers and the Syilx/Okanagan people. To the Syilx, the being is known as n ̓x̌ax̌aitkʷ (n-ha-ha-it-koo), a sacred spirit of the lake that protects the valley. The spirit was said to dwell in caves under Rattlesnake Island (a.k.a. Monster Island) or adjacent to Squally Point. However, Jordan Coble of the Westbank First Nation counters by saying that the creature is a being that is meant to be respected, not feared. He also goes on to explain that the concept of "n'ha-a-itk" includes the creature as well as everything that exists in the valley. Coble also disputes the notion of "n'ha'a'itk" being an evil spirit, as the creature is not restricted to the water and has been witnessed on land, which indicates a physical creature rather than a lakebound phantasm. The First Nations around Okanagan do not dismiss the creature as being purely folkloric. Knowledge keeper (Note: A knowledge keeper is a person in Indigenous communities who is recognized for their experiential wisdom and their expertise on cultural traditions.) Richard Armstrong in Penticton, the southernmost town on Okanagan Lake, commented that Western culture often attempts to explain things away and to First Nation peoples, the existence of the lake creature is an accepted part of life and reality.

== Alleged sightings ==
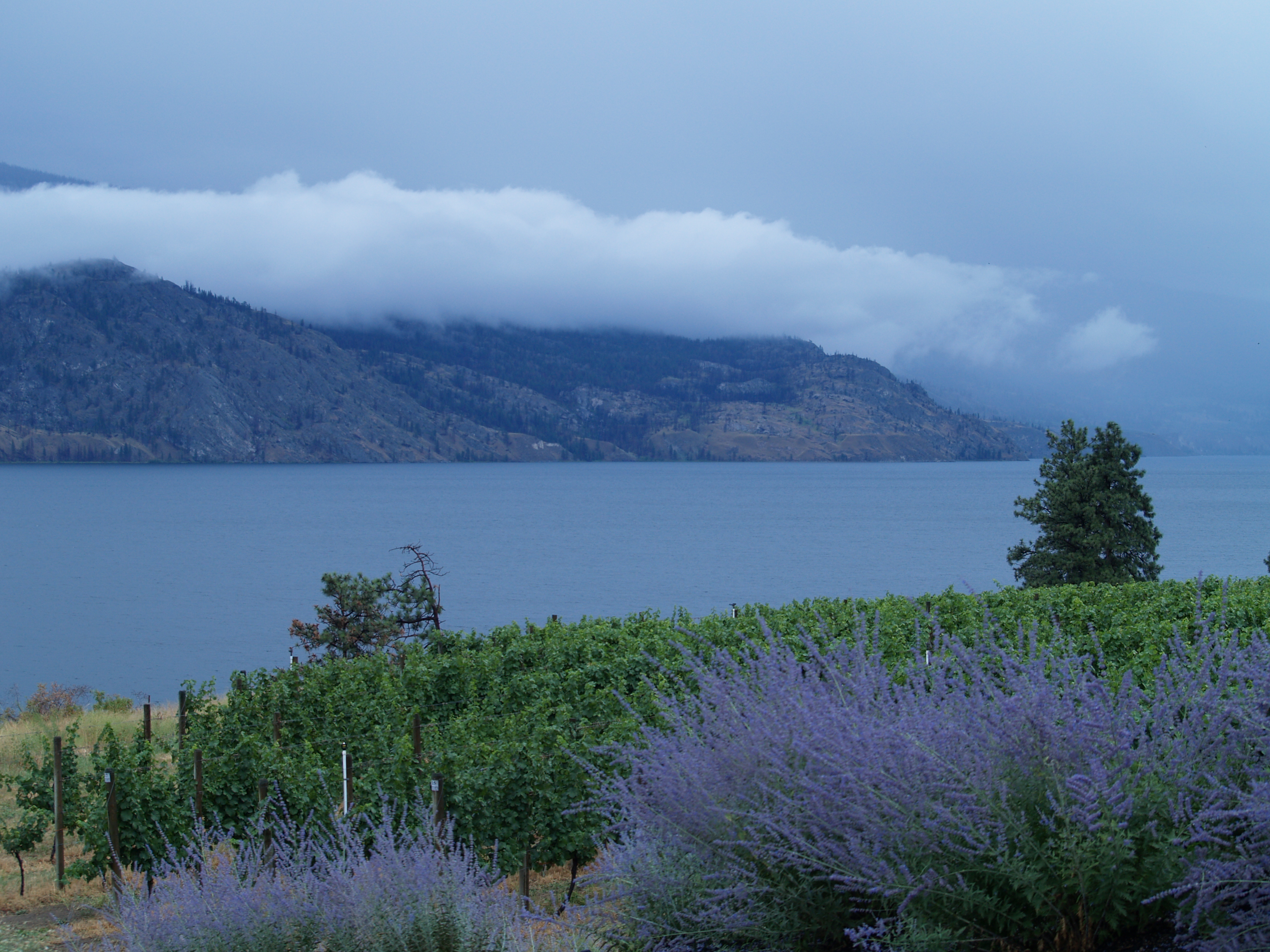
Ogopogo is said to inhabit Okanagan Lake

Susan Allison's 1872 sighting was the first detailed Ogopogo account from a white settler. She was the first non-native person to live in the region, establishing relations with the native peoples.

While driving on Highway 97 in 1968, Art Folden noticed something moving in the lake. He pulled off the road and filmed what he claimed to be footage of the alleged creature, showing a large wake moving across the water. Folden estimated that the Ogopogo was 100 metres (110 yards) offshore. A computer analysis of the footage concluded it was a solid, three-dimensional object. Folden noticed "something large and lifelike" out in the distance on the calm water and pulled out his home movie camera to capture the object. A 2005 investigation conducted by Benjamin Radford with Joe Nickell and John Kirk for the National Geographic Channel television show Is It Real?, utilized surveyor boats to find the actual distance of the alleged creature from the shore. They found that it was much closer to shore than originally thought, resulting in a reduction of actual size and speed. They concluded that it was likely a real animal, but its size had been greatly overestimated and that it was probably a water fowl, otter, or beaver too far away to be identified.

In the 1980s, a local tourism agency offered a cash reward for a proven sighting of the beast. Greenpeace announced that the beast must be filmed and not captured: the Ogopogo was listed as an endangered species.

In 1980, around 50 tourists watched an alleged Ogopogo for about 45 minutes off a beach at Kelowna. Larry Thal, a tourist from Vancouver, captured 10 seconds of the sighting on 8 mm film. Some skeptics have suggested that this footage captured only a pair of otters.

In 1989, John Kirk reportedly saw an animal which was 10.7 to 12.2 metres (35 to 40 ft) long and consisted of "five sleek jet-black humps" with a lashing tail. He believed it to be traveling at around 40 kilometres (25 miles) per hour.

Another sighting occurred in 1989, in an area of log booms near Bear Creek. Ken Chaplin and his 78 year old father Clem staked out the area with a video camera. Chaplin caught what he described as a slim, serpent-like creature measuring up to 15 feet (4.6 m) in length swimming approximately 75 feet (23 m) from their canoe. The creature slapped its tail before diving, with force Chaplin described as being enough to "have killed a man if it had hit him." Chaplin returned to the location with his daughter a few days later and sighted the same creature again. These sightings sparked a media frenzy in which they were cataloged in a Time Magazine, and appeared in an episode of Unsolved Mysteries. However, the sighting was quickly dismissed by local biologists with Robert Lincoln stating Chaplin had likely exaggerated the size, and that the creature in the video was likely a beaver. Chris Bull a former head of the Fisheries and Oceans Canada backed up Robert's conclusion stating that sightings like Chaplin's are commonly the result of quick thinking, and misinterpretations.

On July 24, 1992, Paul Demara videotaped "something or some things" that were "traveling just below the surface of the water at a fairly good speed," which was estimated to have been 8 kilometres per hour (5.0 miles per hour). In the footage, a boat towing a water skier suddenly appears in frame and the skier falls into the water near the object. Within several minutes, DeMara made two other videotapes, each showing what appeared to be multiple animals in the water. Benjamin Radford suggested that the creature was only several otters. In 2005, FBI contract instructor and Certified Forensic Video Analyst Grant Fredericks concluded that the object "was very consistent with debris from a fallen tree in the water," noting that it "very slowly bobs up and down." He also pointed out that the alleged creature did not react to the water skier, and the skier did not seem alarmed.

In August 2008, a local photographer named Sean Viloria and his girlfriend Jessica Weagers were sitting by the lakeshore in Peachland when Weagers noticed a disturbance in the water. Viloria snapped one photograph, but his camera died and he wasn't able to capture any more. The image captured depicted two humps emerging from the water(The image wouldn't make a public appearance until 2020). Eight days later, south of the original sighting, Viloria, and Weagers spotted another disturbance on the water snapping 11 photographs of an unknown object as it surfaced near a boat(Only 3-4 have been publicly shown). The main photograph was interpreted as either being the tail or neck of the object, while the other two showed the back. Viloria estimated the creature as being 5.5–6 m (18–20 ft) long, judging by the size of the boat in the background. The photos were examined by many local experts. Chris Bull concluded it didn't look like any known animal of the lake. A biologist noted the black/red texture was possibly a different creature or pollution. Members of the show MonsterQuest examined the photographs and found no evidence of tampering, as featured in the 2009 episode "Lake Demons". This broadcast marked the first appearance of the photos on television(A special edition version in 2020 shows Viloria's first photo). However people have suggested Viloria had taken photos of a wind surfer that had tipped over which explained the colors.

In 2011, a cell phone video captured two dark shapes in the water. A suggested explanation is that the video shows two logs. Radford analyzed the video for Discovery News and concluded that "the video quality is poor and the camera is shaky, but a closer look at the 30-second video reveals that, instead of one long object, there are actually two shorter ones, and they seem to be floating next to each other at slightly different angles. There are no humps, nor head, nor form; only two long, darkish, more or less straight forms that appear to be a few dozen feet long. In short, they look a lot like floating logs, which would not be surprising since Okanagan Lake has tens of thousands of logs harvested by the timber industry floating just under the lake's surface."

Three sightings were reported in September 2018, one of which described a giant snake approximately 15 m (49 ft) long.

In June 2024, there was a reported sighting which described a long snake in the water.

== Searches ==
In 2000, a Japanese expedition caught a 40 foot sonar image of an object about 7 meters below the point near Rattlesnake Island. Several underwater caves were also discovered off of the island as well. A following expedition in 2001 resulted in inconclusive sonar readings of a large object, and another in 2006 discovered more caves at much greater depths.

In 2009 an expedition was led by Ogopogo enthusiast Bill niy which consisted of thermal imaging by helicopter, a zodiac chase boat, and a dive team to investigate various caves reported near Rattlesnake Island and Squally Point. The expedition started near the break of dawn where immediately the Chase Boat encountered a cluster of bird activity North of Rattlesnake Island hinting something large was preying below the surface. The thermal imaging helicopter found large heat trails near the surface offshore of Squally Point. Ray Snitynsky who took the thermal images analyzed the object that made the trails ranged from 40-50ft in length. A dive expedition led to the divers recovering a decomposed snake like carcass off an underwater ledge. Unfortunately, a DNA analysis revealed the carcass was a Kokanee salmon that deteriorated to the point it was unidentifiable. The following day, diver Craig Smiley was dropped into the lake near Rattlesnake Island, and hydroacoustic baiting via underwater recordings by Bill Steciuk were used to lure in the creature. When the sound frequency increased, Smiley's signal was temporarily lost after sediment was stirred around him supposedly triggering an animal. Smiley also discovered large sinkholes on the lake floor with some up to 5 meters long. This expedition was broadcast on the show Monster Quest in the episode "Lake Demons".

In 2023, an expedition was led by Bill Gibbons, and Bill Steciuk consisting of ROV equipment investigating known locations of sightings. The first location was Rattlesnake Island, and Squally Point, but a strong wind forced them to retreat North past Kelowna. The next location was the mouth of Bear Creek where a small dark mass passed their boat. They then moved to the deepest part of the lake where they caught on camera an object about 3 m(9 ft) long swimming near their boat.

== Explanations ==
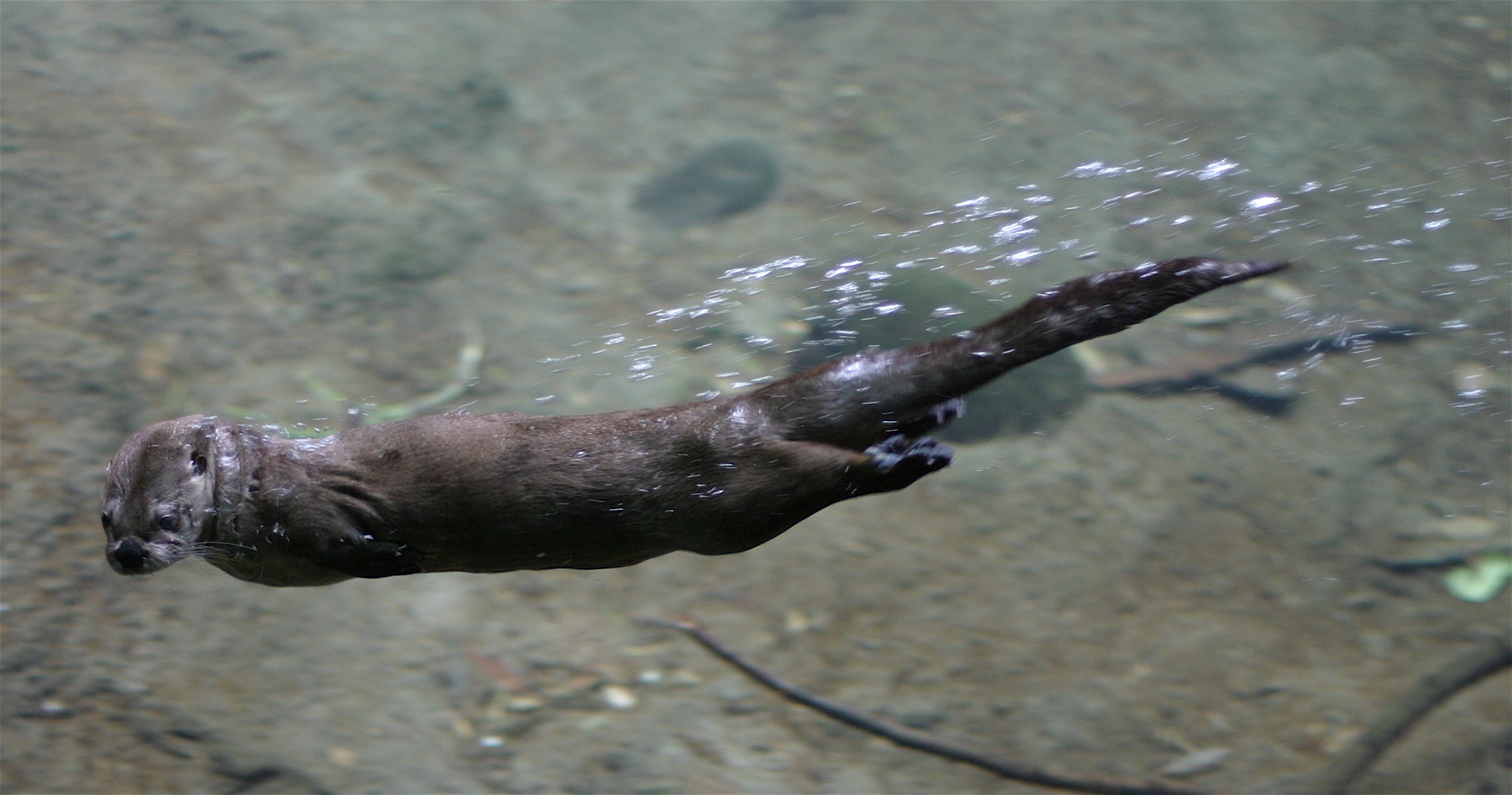
Otters, especially when swimming in a row, may be mistaken for a lake monster

According to skeptical author Benjamin Radford, contemporary sightings of Ogopogo were most likely misidentifications of water fowl, otter, or beaver, adding, "[the First Nations stories] were not referring to a literal lake monster like Ogopogo, but instead to a legendary water spirit. Though the supernatural N'ha-a-itk of the Okanagan Valley Indians are long gone, a decidedly less fearsome — and more biological — beast, whose exact form is a matter of debate, has replaced it." Joe Nickel and Benjamin Radford propose an origin in claims of "sightings" in wildlife in the region. Otters often swim in a row and their motion can often be mistaken for one continuous serpent. Radford pointed to John Kirk's 1989 sighting as likely being a group of otters.

Sturgeon are often mistaken as lake monsters, but their existence in Okanagan is unclear. There is currently an unclaimed $10,000 reward for definitive evidence of sturgeon in Okanagan.

Benjamin Radford has pointed to waterspouts as a likely source of inspiration for First Nation myths. Waterspouts are fairly common on Okanagan Lake, often forming when air temperatures drop and the lake still has a relatively warm water temperature.

== Appearances in other media ==
In "Quagmire", a third season episode of The X-Files, Agent Mulder mentions the Ogopogo of Lake Okanagan to his partner Agent Scully as an example of recognized lake creatures.

The Ogopogo is referenced in the English language translation of the Super Nintendo game Final Fantasy IV, lending its name to a superboss in the game's final dungeon. The creature manifests as a more deadly incarnation of the summoned monster Leviathan, and uses a water attack named Deluge.

The animated series The Venture Bros. references the Ogopogo in the episode "Return to Malice". Number 21, a henchman of the series' antagonist and a prominent secondary character, claims the creature is real, clarifying that it is a plesiosaur, and derides Champ and Nessie as hoaxes.

Okanagan Lake and the Ogopogo feature prominently in the plot of "Ogopogo!", an episode of Mike Tyson Mysteries.

The Yu-Gi-Oh! trading card game features a set of monsters based on cryptids from around the world. Among them is a version of the Ogopogo, with an appearance based on its commonly accepted features.

In Paranormasight: The Seven Mysteries of Honjo, Yoko Fukunaga named her dog Ogopogo after the lake monster.

The Gravity Falls Season 1 episode, "The Legend of the Gobblewonker" depicts a Plesiosaur-like lake monster similar to that of the Ogopogo and Nessie. The monster is said to live on "Scuttlebutt Island" in Lake Gravity Falls which takes inspiration from Rattlesnake Island. The monster chases the main protagonists around the lake before being caught in a cave entrance revealing it to be a robot controlled by the town's idiot Fiddleford McGucket, who explains he made it so he can get attention from his son. At the end it is revealed there is a real Gobblewonker swimming in the lake.

== Gallery ==
This Indigenous petroglyph is often said to be of Okanagan Lake's Ogopogo cryptid, but is in fact from Sproat Lake in Vancouver Island.

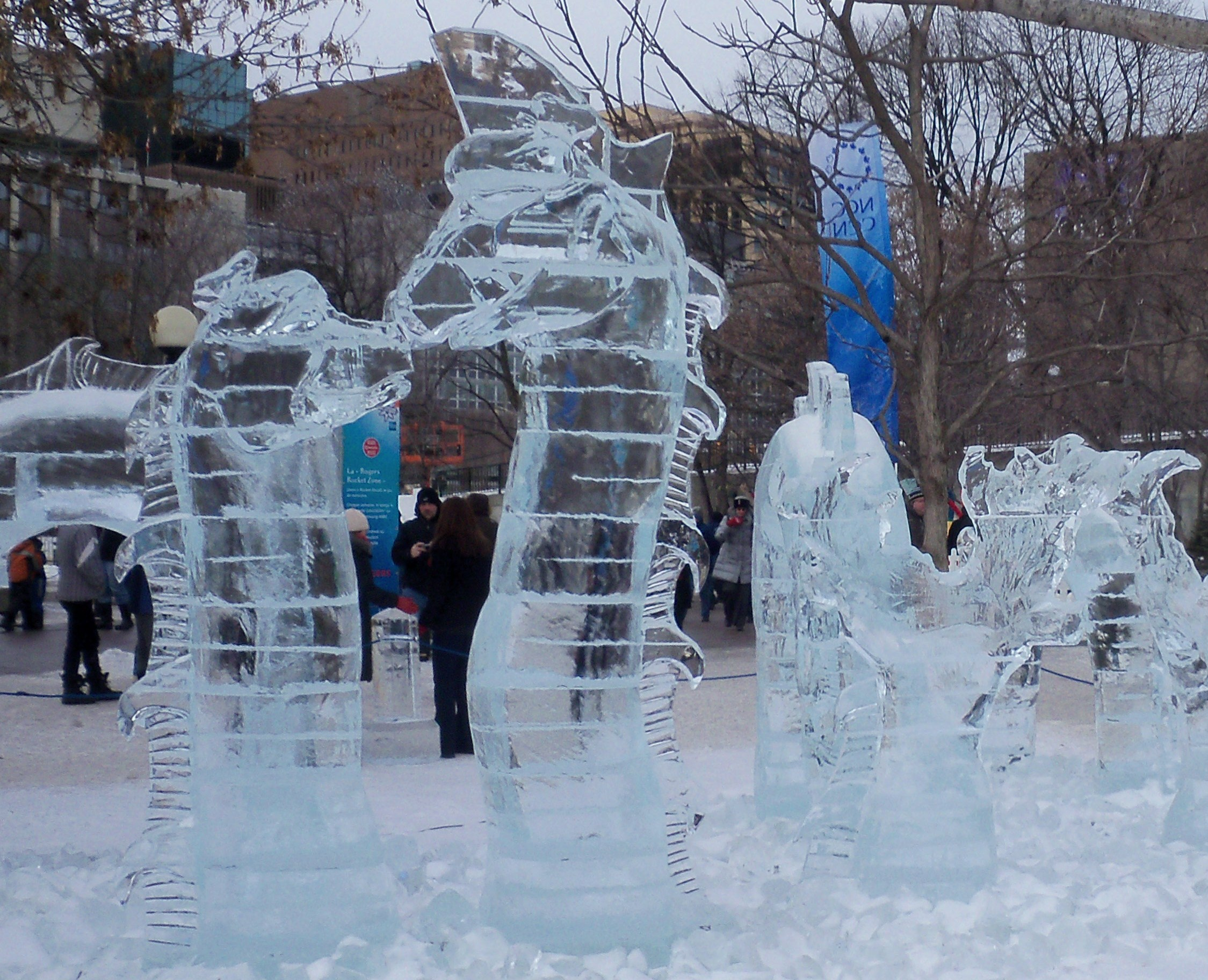
The Ottawa Winterlude’s Ice sculpture of the mythical monster Ogopogo presented in 2010

== See also ==
- Champ – Alleged lake monster in Lake Champlain, United States
- Igopogo – Legendary lake monster of Lake Simcoe, Ontario
- Manipogo – Legendary lake monster of Lake Manitoba
- Memphre – Legendary lake monster of Lake Memphremagog
- Nessie – Mythical creature in Scottish folklore
- Seelkee – British Columbian lake monster
- Underwater panther – Legendary creature in Indigenous folklore
- List of cryptids
- List of reported lake monsters

== Bibliography ==
- Gaal, Arlene (2001) In Search of Ogopogo. Hancock House, Surrey, British Columbia
- Gaal, Arlene (1986) Ogopogo: The True Story of The Okanagan Lake Million Dollar Monster. Hancock House, Surrey, BC.
- Moon, Mary (1977) Ogopogo. Douglas Ltd., North Vancouver, British Columbia.
- Nickell, Joe (2006) "Ogopogo: The Lake Okangan Monster". Skeptical Inquirer, 30(1): 16–19.
- Radford, Benjamin (2006) "Ogopogo the Chameleon". Skeptical Inquirer, 30(1): 41–46.
- Radford, Benjamin and Nickell, Joe (2006) Lake Monster Mysteries: Investigating the World’s Most Elusive Creatures. University Press of Kentucky, Lexington, Kentucky.
- Salmonson, Jessica Amanda (1992) The Mysterious Doom and Other Ghostly Tales of the Pacific Northwest: 149. Sasquatch Books, Seattle, Washington.
