= Dalbec (folklore) =

Quebec folk hero

Dalbec is a folk hero from traditional Quebec folklore. Some tales of Dalbec were published by the folklorist William Parker Greenough in Canadian Folk-Life and Folk-Lore (1897).

According to Greenough, he heard several folktales (or contes, as they were called) involving Dalbec, as told by a French-Canadian raconteur (storyteller), a guide named Nazaire. Dalbec was a hunter, and his adventures are invariably outlandish and concern amazing feats involving overpowering animals:

Dalbec was in the woods making maple sugar, when he saw a bear coming round as if bent on mischief. Having no gun Dalbec crawled under an empty hogshead (such as are often used to hold the sap as it is collected). The bear came smelling up, trying to find a way to get in. At the right moment Dalbec reached his hand through the bung-hole and seized him by the tail. The bear started off on a run down the hill, dragging the hogshead after him with Dalbec inside of it. They came to a lot of fallen timber, where the hogshead stuck, but Dalbec held on till the tail came out and the bear escaped. The fact that the bear has no tail of which a person could take hold does not affect the truth of this story.

Along with Ti-Jean and the voyageur-hero Jean Cadieux, Dalbec is one of the most well-known characters of Quebec folklore.

== See also ==
- Canadian folklore
