= Dick Vincent =

Canadian television host (born 1939)

Dick Vincent (born 1939 in Kirkland Lake, Ontario, Canada) was best known as the announcer and on-air host at KCND-TV in the 1960s and 1970s.

Dick started his broadcasting career as a news reporter with radio station CKDM in Dauphin, Manitoba. He was station announcer at CJOB from 1959 to 1960. KCND signed off and moved to Winnipeg, Manitoba as CKND-TV in 1975. Vincent moved with the station to Winnipeg and remained a station personality, hosting local programs including Town 'n Country.
