= Canadian folklore =

Canadian folklore is the traditional material that Canadians pass down from generation to generation, either as oral literature or "by custom or practice". It includes songs, legends, jokes, rhymes, proverbs, weather lore, superstitions, and practices such as traditional food-making and craft-making. The largest bodies of folklore in Canada belong to the aboriginal and French-Canadian cultures. English-Canadian folklore and the folklore of recent immigrant groups have added to the country's folk.

== Indigenous folklore and mythology ==
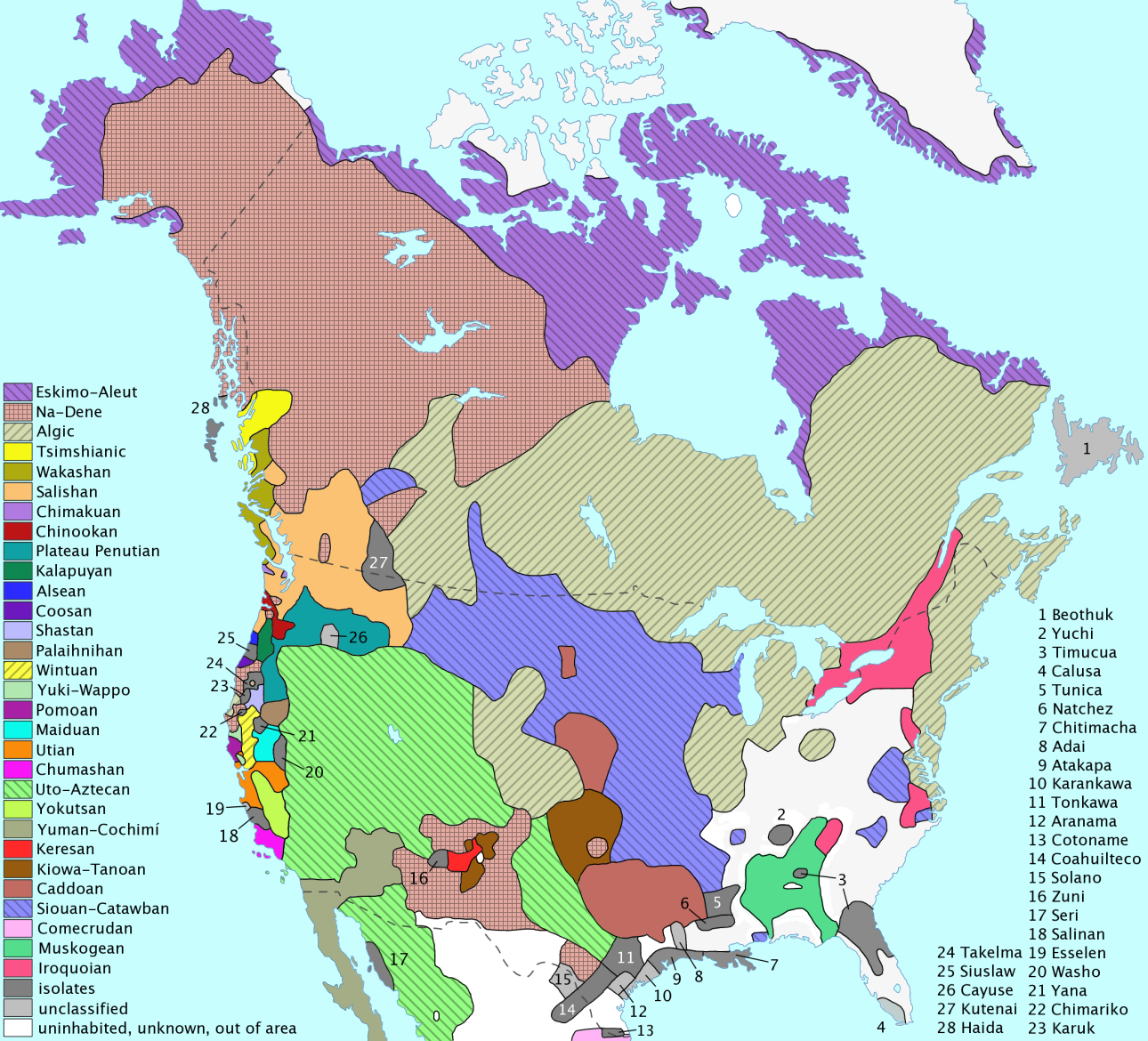
Indigenous language families north of Mexico. The collection and study of Indigenous peoples mythology and folklore is done through language families.

The classic definitions of folklore were created by Europeans such as William Thoms, who coined the term in 1846 to refer to "manners, customs [...] of the olden times". The study of folklore grew out of the European concept of folk, often understood to mean "common, uneducated people mostly in villages or rural communities". This definition falls short of capturing the formal aspect of many Indigenous traditions. Even 19th century folklorists collecting and attempting to translate Indigenous oral literature recognized the immense challenge of bridging the culture gap. Ethnographer Horatio Hale wrote in 1874 that creation myths and myths explaining the origin of sacred ceremonies, "were, in a certain sense, articles of religion and were handed down with scrupulous exactness." As one Native chief explained,

It is very difficult for a stranger to rightly understand the morals of their stories [...] And when you have learned all that language can convey, there are still a thousand images, suggestions and associations recurring to the Indian, which can strike no chord in your heart. The myriad voices of nature are dumb to you, but to them they are full of life and power.

Among many Native cultures, "storytelling" was normally restricted to the long winter evenings. The Cree were one culture with a strict belief in this regard: "During the summer, no stories founded on fiction were ever told; the Indigenous peoples believing that if any 'fairy' tales were told during that season when they were supposed to use their time to best advantage, the narrator would have his life destroyed by the lizard, which would suck his blood."

Indigenous folklore and mythology are sometimes collected and studied according to language families, such as Algonquian, Athabaskan, Iroquoian, Kutenai, Salishan, Siouan, and others. Classification schemes for indigenous languages of the Americas can vary. Large language families can include Native cultures in geographically distant areas, for example, the Algonquian language family includes the M'igmaw of the modern-day Maritime provinces as well as the Odawa people of the Ottawa River region.

=== Themes and genres ===
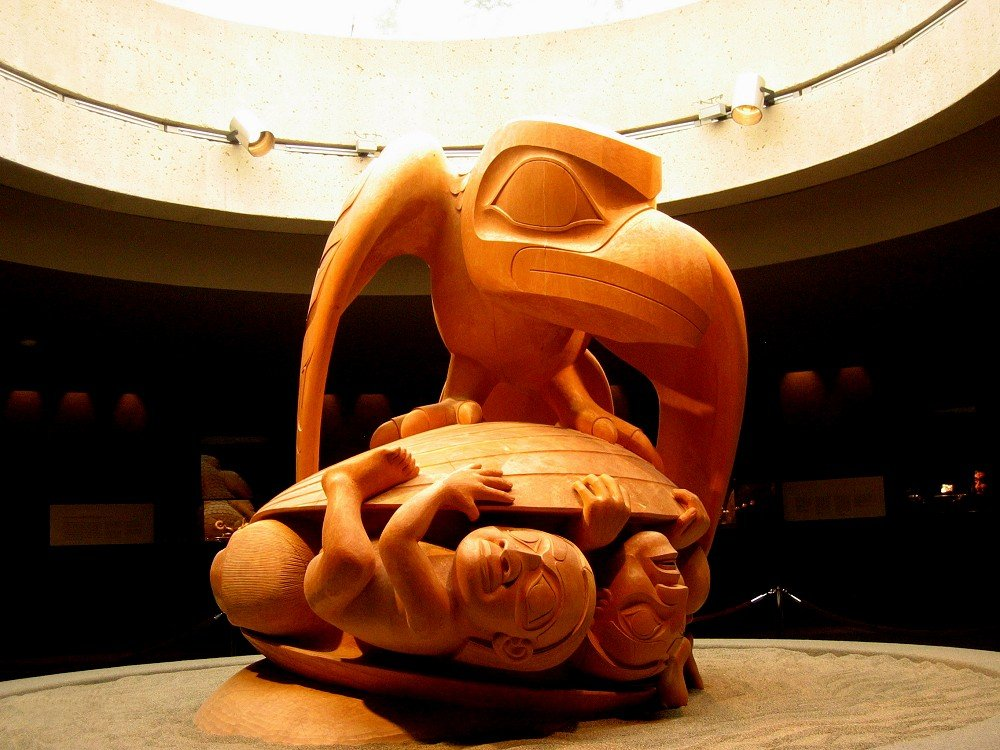
Bill Reid's sculpture Raven and the First Men, showing part of a Haida creation myth. The Raven represents the Trickster figure common to many mythologies. The work is in the Museum of Anthropology at the University of British Columbia.

Some broad themes can be identified in Indigenous Canadian mythology. Creation myths are among the most sacred to many Indigenous cultures. Haida myths of the Raven, a "celestial being", explain the creation of the sun. The Haida word for Raven means "the one who is going to order things", and it was Raven who established the laws of nature and was present when people were first created.

One creation myth from the Northeastern Woodlands tribes describes the creation of North America, or Turtle Island, by Muskrat and Turtle. Myths about the origins of landscape features, such as mountains and rivers, are common in several Indigenous peoples oral traditions.

Supernatural beings are prominent in many myths about the origin of places, animals, and other natural phenomena. Nanabozho is the "trickster" spirit and hero of Ojibwa mythology (part of the larger body of Anishinaabe traditional beliefs). Glooscap, a giant gifted with supernatural powers, is the hero and "transformer" of the mythology of the Wabanaki peoples. Supernatural experiences by ordinary mortals are found in other myths. For example, the Chippewa have myths explaining the first corn and the first robin, triggered by a boy's vision. Some myths explain the origins of sacred rituals or objects, such as sweat lodges, wampum, and the sun dance.

Cryptids, or mythical beasts, exist in some Native folklore. Bigfoot, or Sasquatch, the Wendigo, and Ogopogo are popular examples.

== French-Canadian folklore ==
French-Canadian folklore has its roots in the folklore of France, with some stock characters such as Ti-Jean, the everyman character. Other popular heroes of French-Canadian folklore were created in New France, such as the exploits of the hunter Dalbec, and the voyageur Jean Cadieux. The earliest French-Canadian folksong celebrates the adventures of Jean Cadieux.

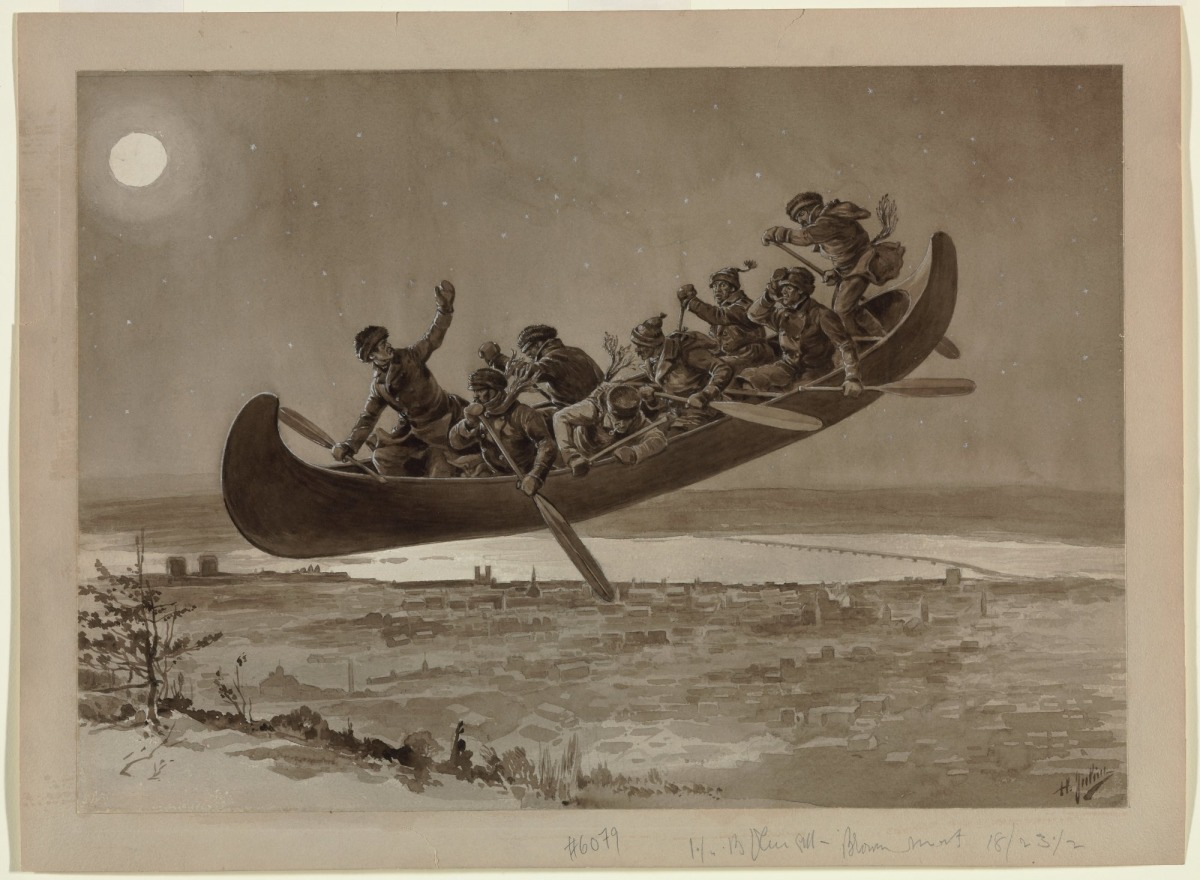
Depiction of La chasse-galerie (The Flying Canoe), a popular French-Canadian folktale. The coureur des bois/voyageurs were featured in the folklore of Quebec.

Loup-garou (werewolves) and shape-shifting sorcerers turning into animals such as owls or bears "to torture their enemies" are widespread in French-Canadian legends. The presence of demons and priests in many French-Canadian legends attests to the dominant presence of the Catholic church and its rituals in everyday life in New France and Acadia.

The folklore of the coureur des bois and voyageurs has been much studied, particularly the chansons (songs) they created to help them paddle in unison when canoeing and to build morale. Folksongs and tall tales were part of the festivities at the veillées (evening gatherings) held in habitant communities.

The folklore of French Canada includes some rituals associated with Church holidays. The Temps des fêtes (Candlemas) was long celebrated at the end of the Christmas season in both Quebec and in Acadian communities. Food was central to the celebration. It was traditional to use up the remains of the year's wheat harvest by making crepes or donuts. The round, golden shapes alluded to the sun, the coming of Spring, and the full circle of the annual harvest cycle.

A recent folk tradition that adapts a custom from France is the Tintamarre parade of Acadia, similar to France's Medieval Charivari festivities.

== English-Canadian folklore ==
Early English-Canadian folklore has several points of origin, due to the various settler groups that came to the country from England, Scotland, Ireland, and as Loyalists following the American Revolutionary War. Each group brought their own traditions and created new folklore in their new homeland. In the generations since the early settlers, waves of immigrants have come to Canada from around the world, adding their own folklore to the country's mix.

Oral traditions in Canada mainly have a regional or community-based identity. This has been influenced by Canada's vast geography and early settlement patterns. Folklorists have often focused on specific regional or ethnic communities, as with Helen Creighton's work recording and documenting Nova Scotia sea-songs and ballads, or the many studies of the folklore of Newfoundland.

=== Atlantic provinces ===
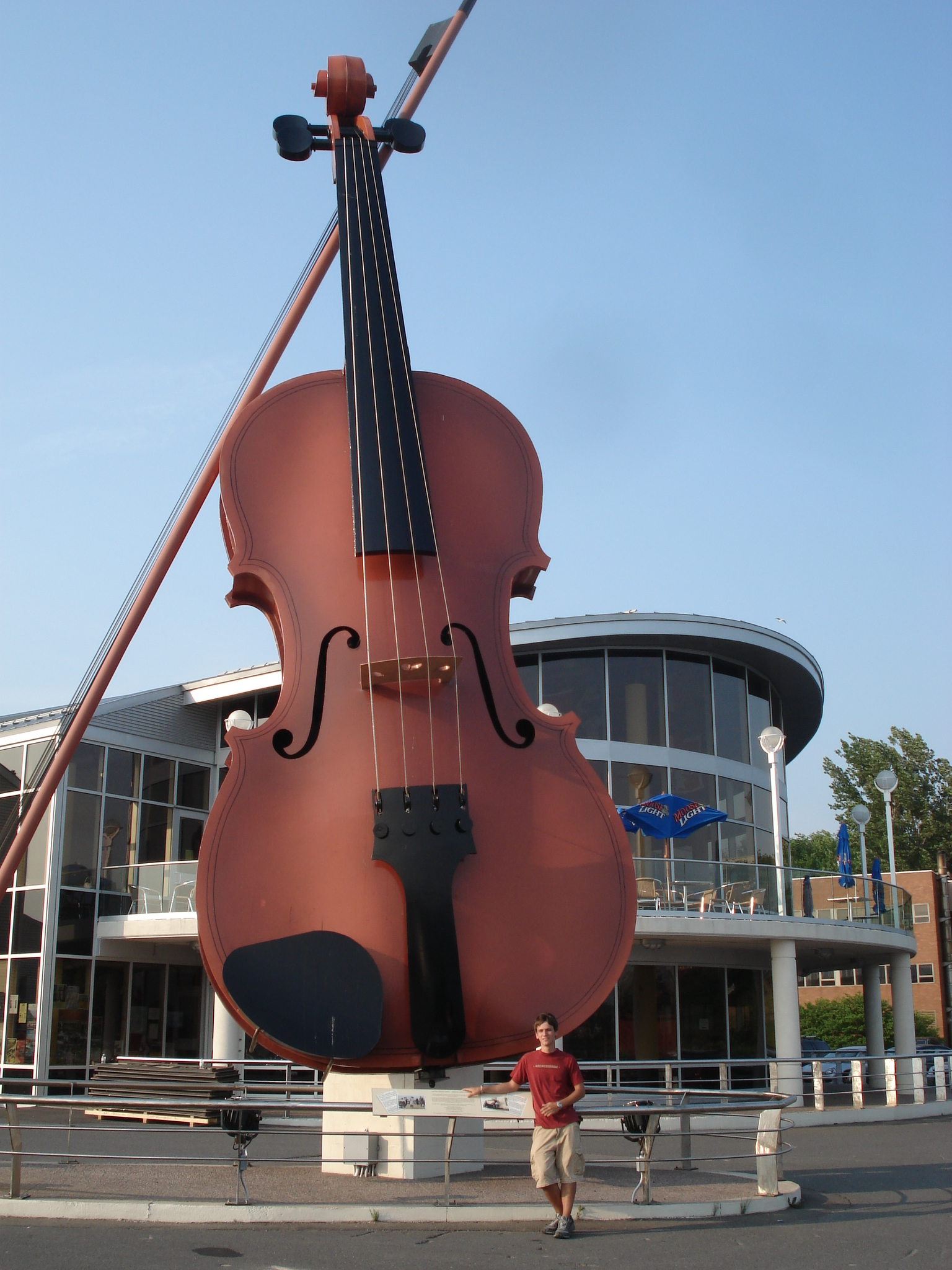
The Big Fiddle of the Ceilidh in Sydney, Nova Scotia. Canadian fiddle is a recognizable part of Maritime culture.

The music and folklore of Newfoundland's people are influenced by their ancestors, settlers who mainly came from south east Ireland (County Wexford, County Cork) and England (Dorset, Devon). The folk stories of Newfoundland can sometimes be traced back to Ireland and Great Britain, as with the stock character Jack. The retelling of these stories over generations in the isolated Newfoundland outports of the island gave them a "distinctive Newfoundland flavour". As elsewhere where Jack stories are told, the Jack of Newfoundland lore is "lazy or mischievous, but he is nearly always resourceful when faced with adversity", as when he confronts giants or ghosts. Local folk music and Irish folk music remain popular in Newfoundland, as well as throughout the Maritime provinces, where Canadian fiddle music is a recognizable part of the regional culture.

Ghost stories figure prominently in the folklore of the Atlantic provinces. One example is the story of the Dungarvon Whooper, a tale involving a logger from the Dungarvon River near Miramichi, New Brunswick in the 1860s. According to the legend, the logger murdered a camp cook for his money. It has been claimed that eerie screams and howls have been heard in the woods near the Dungarvon River ever since.

=== Central Canada ===
Some popular folklore in Canada involves lore connected with actual historical people, such as the "Black Donnellys", a family from Lucan, Ontario. The family was at the centre of allegations of a crime spree, that ended with a massacre at the hands of a mob. Thomas P. Kelly wrote a popular book on the Black Donnellys in the 1950s, and the story of the family has been retold and fictionalized ever since.

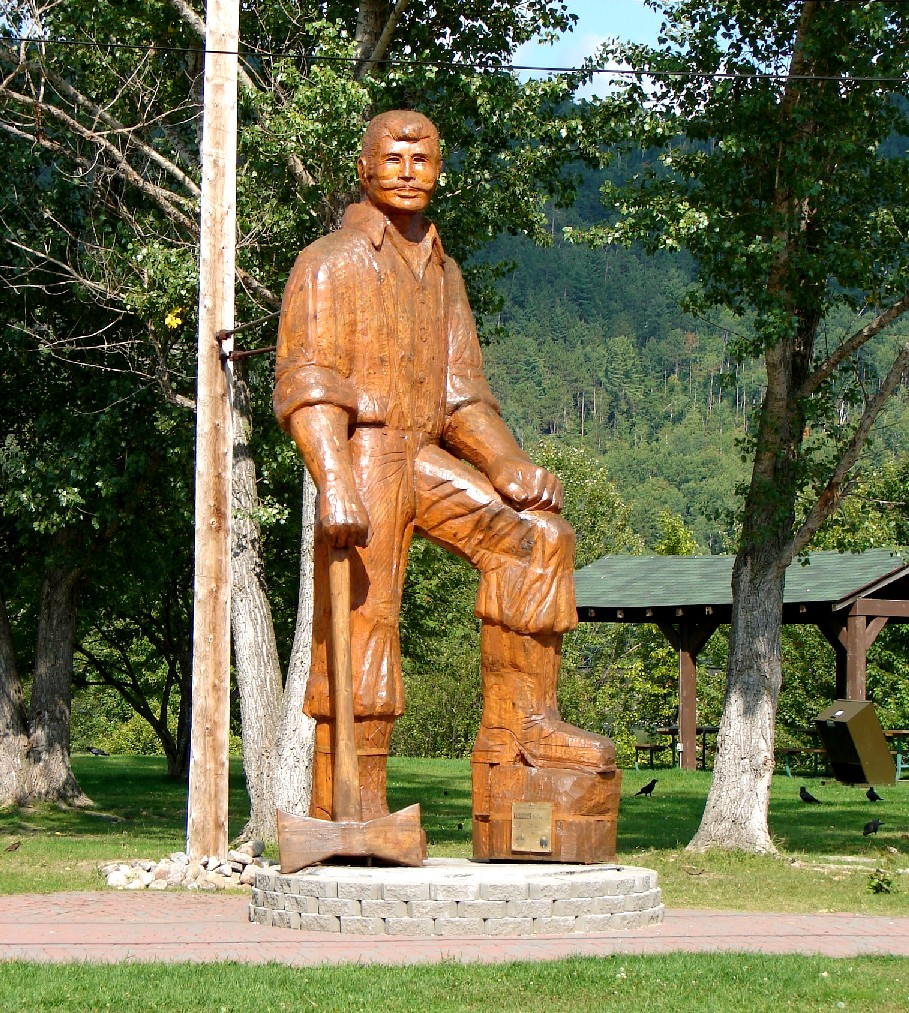
A wooden statue of folk hero Big Joe Mufferaw in Mattawa, Ontario. Mufferaw was based on the exploits of lumberjack Joseph Montferrand.

Lumberjack heroes are one genre of Canadian folklore that spread throughout the Great Lakes region. The lumberjack tall tales, some of which later became popular as Paul Bunyan tales, often had French-Canadian origins, but were hugely popular among the itinerant lumberjacks of Ontario and the northern United States as well. Ottawa Valley storytellers transformed a real historical figure, the Quebec lumberjack Joseph Montferrand, into "Joe Muffreau" or "Big Joe Mufferaw". Other lumberjack heroes include Julius Neville, Louis Cyr, and Napoleon La Rue. The influence of the lumber industry had also permeated into English-Canadian folk music, with the log driving being the focus of The Log Driver's Waltz.

=== Canadian Prairies ===
Among the later immigrant groups to Canada, the folklore of settlers in the western Canadian Prairies has been much studied. Folklore traditions brought from Central and Eastern Europe have survived in Ukrainian, Lithuanian, Doukhobor, Mennonite, and other communities of the region.

=== Northern Canada ===
Folk tales about the adventurers in northern Canada (particularly about the Yukon's Klondike Gold Rush era) provide more examples of folk heroes based on real historical people. These include the stories told about Sam Steele and "Klondike Kate" (Kathleen Rockwell). Verse ballads by poet Robert Service told tall tales about colourful Klondike characters, such as The Cremation of Sam McGee and The Shooting of Dan McGrew. The poems were partly based on real events and people, but through popular repetition grew into folklore.

== See also ==
- Canadian values
- Events of National Historic Significance
- Heritage Minutes - integrate Canadian history, folklore and myths into dramatic storylines.
- National Historic Sites of Canada
- Persons of National Historic Significance
- Acadian folklore
