= O. giganteus =

O. giganteus may refer to:

- Octopus giganteus or Otoctopus giganteus, the St. Augustine monster, the name given to a large unidentified carcass, originally postulated to be the remains of a gigantic octopus
- Ornithocheirus giganteus, a pterosaur reptile species from the Cretaceous period of Europe and South America

== Synonyms ==
- Ommastrephes giganteus, a synonym for Dosidicus gigas, the Humboldt squid or Jumbo Squid, a large predatory squid species found in the waters of the Humboldt Current in the Eastern Pacific Ocean
