= New Zealand Globster =

Whale carcass found in 1965

A whale carcass, initially unidentified due to decomposition, was found washed ashore at Muriwai Beach, 42 kilometres from the centre of Auckland in New Zealand, in March 1965. At some point in time it was dubbed a "globster", after the Tasmanian Globster, a whale carcass found in Australia a few years earlier.

== Contemporary reports ==
Photograph of the New Zealand Globster. Source: Greenwell, J.R. (1988). "Bermuda blob remains unidentified". ISC Newsletter 7 (3): 1-6. (Reproduced in Ellis, R. (1994). Monsters of the Sea. Robert Hale, London. p. 316.)

The Auckland Star reported the find on its front page of 23 March 1965. At that time the carcass was 20 ft (6.1 m) long. It had a tough 1/4 inch thick hide, under which was a thin layer of what appeared to be fat, then solid meat. It was covered in what appeared to be "sand-matted grey hair four to six inches long". A Marine Department officer who had seen it more than a week earlier, said it had then been 30 ft (9.1 m) long by about 8 ft (2.4 m) wide. The carcass was 15 miles from the southern end of the beach, and the article included two photographs of it. When shown the photographs, John Morton, head of the zoology department at the University of Auckland, said, "You can rule out whales because of the hair, and you can rule out sea elephants and sea cows because of its size. I can't think of anything it resembles." The article said that theories on the object ranged from "a sea monster" to "an unusual elephant which had died at sea", without indicating who raised these theories.

The following day, 24 March 1965, the Auckland Star reported that "Laboratory tests by Auckland University zoology specialists on parts of the 'hairy' mass washed up on Muriwai Beach today identified it as the 'very decomposed' remains of a whale." Senior students had visited the carcass the previous evening and cut a sizeable chunk from it. "Senior zoology lecturer Miss J. Robb said today the skin and most of the blubber had been scoured or eaten off the huge mound of flesh, leaving a fibrous tissue which had been so uniformly shredded it looked like hair. 'We are positive of our identification,' said Miss Robb. 'It is a very dead, very smelly whale.'" Neither article in the Auckland Star mentioned the term "globster".

== Later discussion ==
Marine biologist Richard Ellis's 1994 book Monsters of the Sea mentioned the "New Zealand globster", noting that "Greenwell (1988) reproduced a couple of photographs of the New Zealand globster, but they are without specific identification or credit". Ellis himself reproduced one of the photographs, with the credit saying "Photo courtesy of Richard Greenwell and Sidney K. Pierce". The photograph is one of the two published in the Auckland Star on 23 March 1965.
