= Trunko =

Unidentified globster

One of four known photographs of the Trunko carcass, taken by A. C. Jones

Trunko is the nickname for a large unidentified lump of flesh or a decomposed sea creature, a so-called "globster", reportedly sighted in Margate, Union of South Africa on 25 October 1924. The initial source for Trunko was an article entitled "Fish Like A Polar Bear" published on 27 December 1924, edition of London's Daily Mail. The animal was reportedly first seen off the coast battling two killer whales, which fought the unusual creature for three hours. It used its tail to attack the whales and reportedly lifted itself out of the water by about 20 feet (6 m). One of the witnesses, South African farmer Hugh Ballance, described the animal as looking like a "giant polar bear" due to what was thought to be dense-white fur.

The creature reputedly washed up on Margate Beach but despite being there for 10 days, no scientist investigated the carcass while it was beached, so no reliable description has been published, and until September 2010 it was assumed that no photographs of it had ever been published. Some people who have never been identified were reported to have described the animal as possessing snowy-white fur, and an elephantine trunk. While it was beached, the animal was measured by beach-goers and turned out to be 47 ft (14 m) in length, 10 ft (3 m) wide, and 5 ft (1.5 m) high, with the trunk's length being 5 ft (1.5 m), the trunk's diameter 14 in (36 cm), the tail 10 ft (3 m), and the fur being 8 in (20 cm) long. The trunk was said to be attached directly to the animal's torso, as no head was visible on the carcass. For this feature, the animal was dubbed "Trunko" by British cryptozoologist Karl Shuker in his 1996 book The Unexplained.

Commenting on the photos, paleontologist Darren Naish wrote:

They show that it was the rotting carcass of a large vertebrate, most likely a whale. The idea that this was really the body of a white-furred, trunked sea monster stems from naivety about the appearance of rotting animal carcasses … the enormous bulk of the carcass, the large amount of what looks like frayed, badly decayed collagen and the presence of what seems to be a mostly obscured internal skeletal framework suggest that this is another globster – a rotting mass of whale tissue.

== Bibliography ==
- Goldstein, Jack (2014). 101 Mythical Beasts. AUK Authors. Number 41. ASIN B00KH40JYQ.
