= Nantucket Blob =

Whale carcass found in Massachusetts

Samples of the Nantucket Blob.

The Nantucket Blob was a globster that washed ashore on Nantucket Island, Massachusetts, in November 1996.

Analysis of samples in 2004 suggests that the Nantucket Blob was a large mass of adipose tissue from a whale.
