= Bermuda Blob =

Carcasses that washed ashore in Bermuda

Teddy Tucker with the 1988 Bermuda Blob

Bermuda Blob is the name given to two globsters that washed ashore on Bermuda in 1988 and 1997. Originally thought to be the remains of a cryptid, analysis proved the blobs to be the remains of whales.

== 1988 ==
The first Bermuda Blob was found by Teddy Tucker, a fisherman and treasure hunter, in Mangrove Bay in May 1988. Tucker described the blob as "2½ to 3 feet thick ... very white and fibrous ... with five 'arms or legs,' rather like a disfigured star." Samples of the specimen were analysed in 1995 and it was suggested that these were from a poikilothermic sea creature, either a large teleost (bony fish) or an elasmobranch (shark or ray). Subsequent reanalysis of this specimen by the same team, however, using advanced genetic techniques not previously available, confirmed that it was actually the remains of a whale.

== 1997 ==
Bermuda Blob 2, found in 1997

Bermuda Blob 2 was found in January 1997. Analysis of samples in 2004 suggests that Bermuda Blob 2 was a large mass of adipose tissue from a whale.
