= Tasmanian Globster =

Unidentified sea carcass

Coordinates: 41.56°S 144.87°E

External image
- Newspaper front page
- The Mercury, Friday, March 9, 1962

March 9, 1962 issue of The Mercury covering the Tasmanian Globster.

The Tasmanian Globster was a large unidentified carcass that washed ashore 2 miles (3.2 kilometres) north of Interview River in western Tasmania, in August 1960. It measured 20 ft (6.1 m) by 18 ft (5.5 m) and was estimated to weigh between 5 and 10 tons. The mass lacked eyes and in place of a mouth, had "soft, tusk-like protuberances". It had a spine, six soft, fleshy 'arms' and stiff, white bristles covering its body.

The carcass was identified as a whale by L.E. Wall in the journal Tasmanian Naturalist in 1981.

The term globster was coined in 1962 by Ivan T. Sanderson to describe this carcass, and another journalist dubbed the corpse Sea Santa that same year.
