= St. Augustine Monster =

Carcass found in Florida, US in 1896

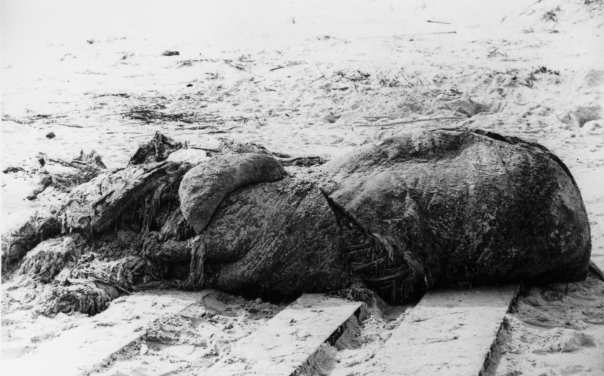
The carcass as it appeared after being dug out of the sand.

The St. Augustine Monster is the name given to a large carcass, originally postulated to be the remains of a gigantic octopus, that washed ashore on the United States coast near St. Augustine, Florida in 1896. It is sometimes referred to as the Florida Monster or the St. Augustine Giant Octopus and is one of the earliest recorded examples of a globster. The species that the carcass supposedly represented has been assigned the binomial names Octopus giganteus (Latin for "giant octopus") and Otoctopus giganteus (Greek prefix: oton = "ear"; "giant-eared octopus"), although these are not valid under the rules of the ICZN.

A 1995 analysis concluded that the St. Augustine Monster was a large mass of the collagenous matrix of whale blubber, likely from a sperm whale.

== Discovery ==
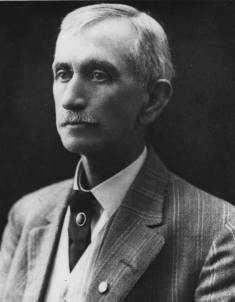
Dr. DeWitt Webb.

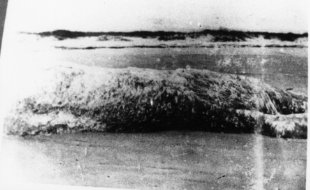
The earliest surviving photograph of the St. Augustine carcass, taken on December 7, 1896. For a long time considered lost, it was obtained by Gary Mangiacopra in 1994.

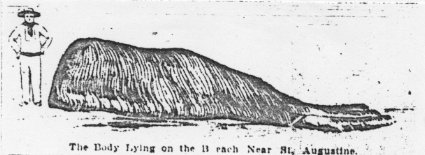
Drawing based on the above photograph that appeared in the Hartford Daily Running on February 18, 1897.

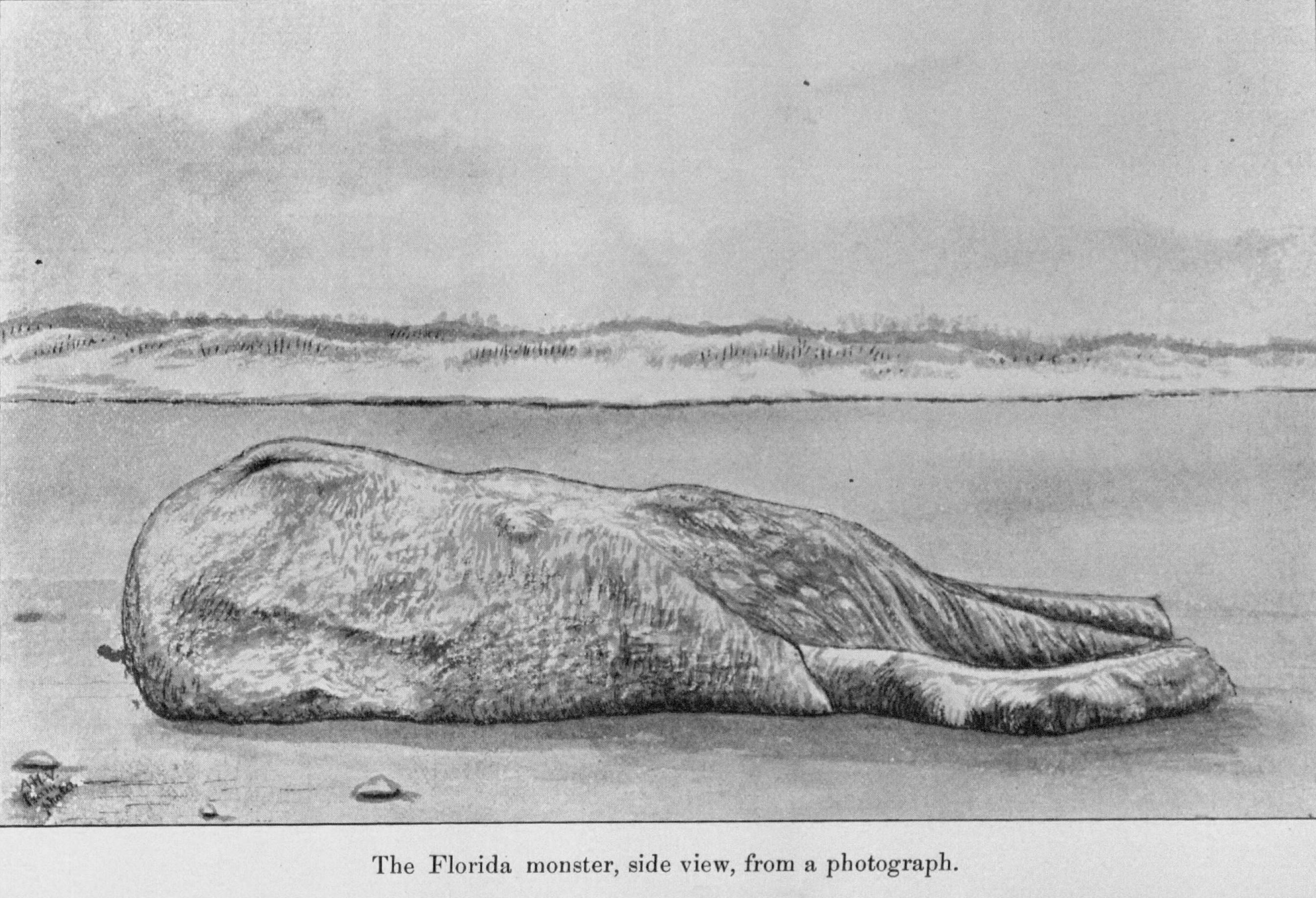
Drawing made by A. E. Verrill based on the same image.

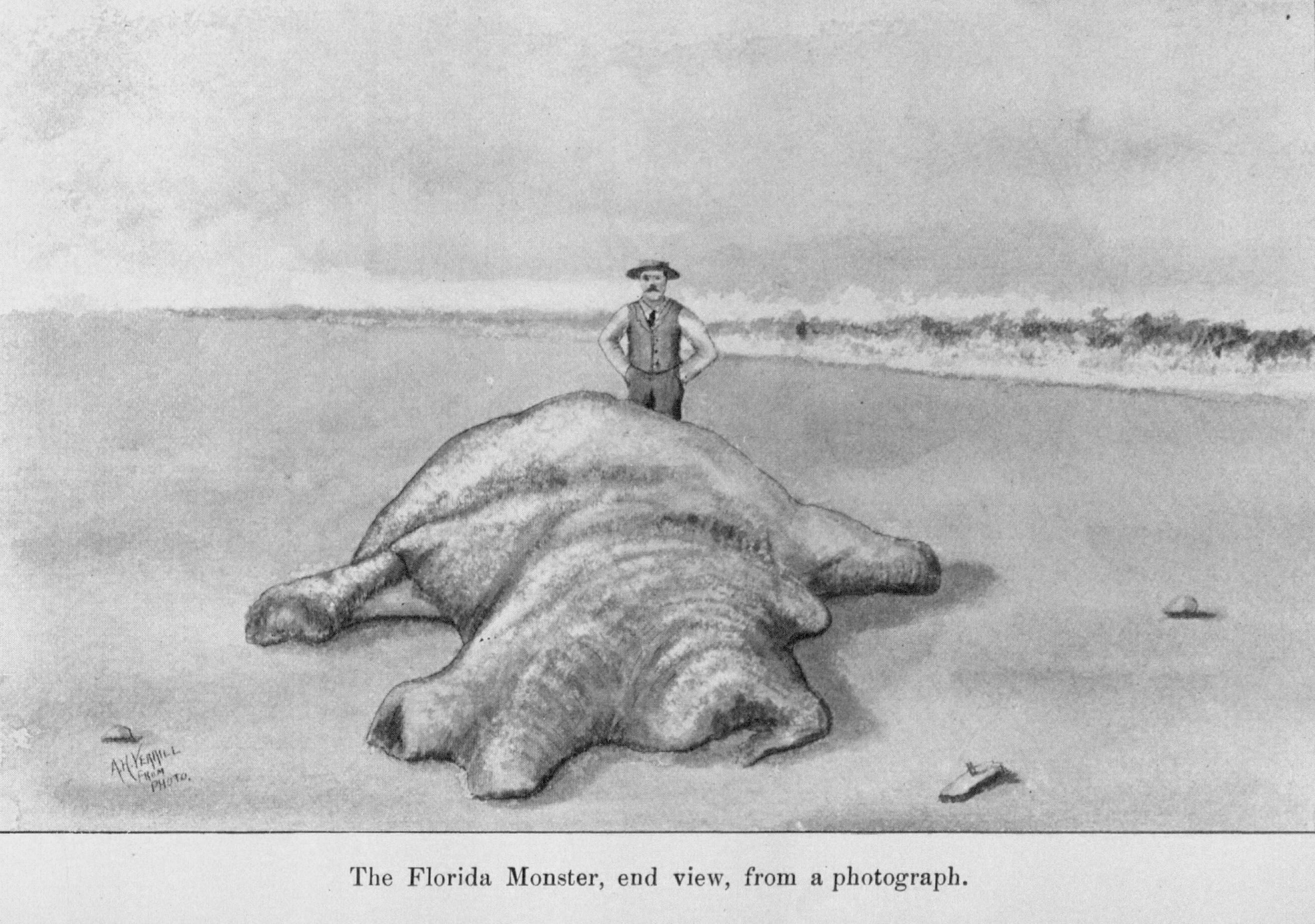
Drawing by A. E. Verrill, based on a photograph, showing the apparent arm stumps.

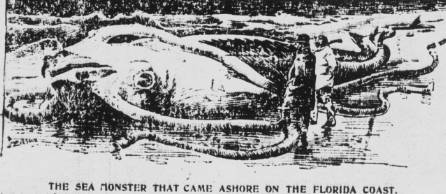
A fanciful depiction of the Florida "sea monster" published in the Pennsylvania Grit.

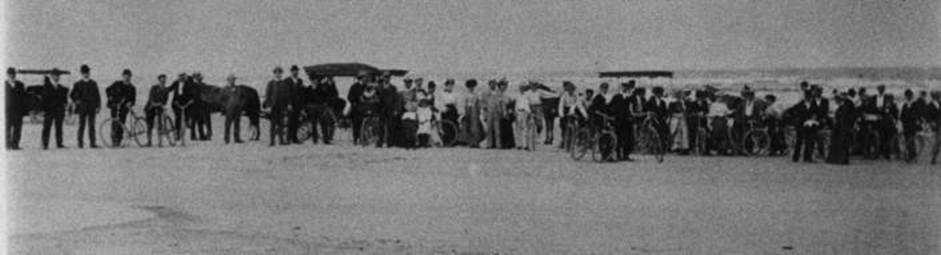
Crowd gathered to see the carcass, photographed by Van Lockwood.

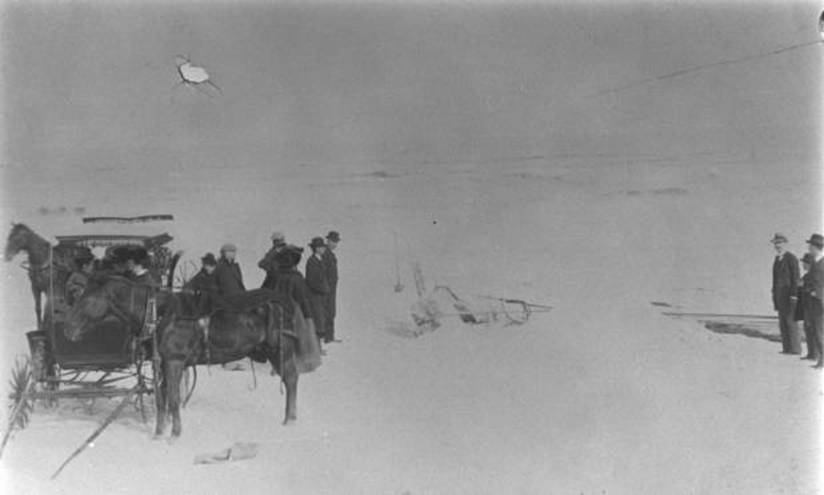
The "Florida Monster" being examined by Webb and his colleagues.

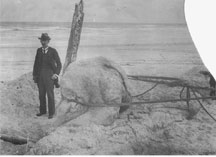
Dr. DeWitt Webb beside the remains.

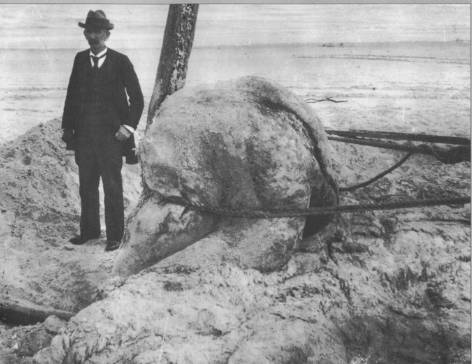
Cropped version of the above image, which has been much reproduced.

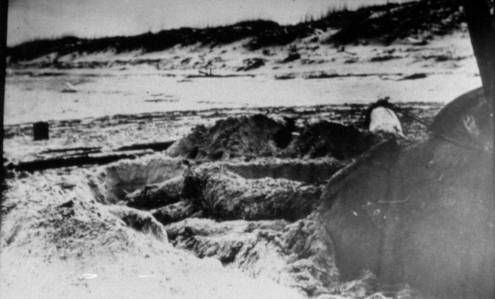
Photograph found in 1993, showing what appears to be an arm on the right.

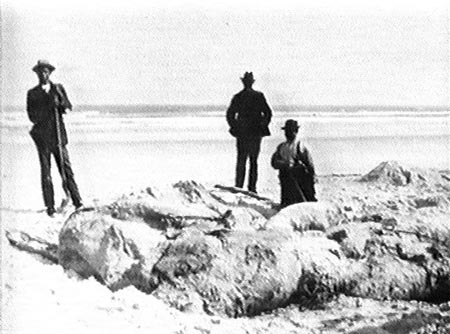
Men digging up the carcass.

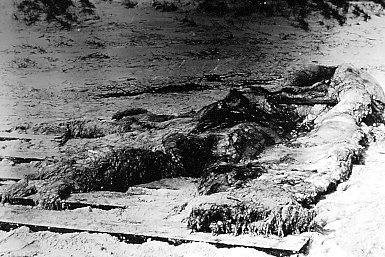
Photograph showing what appear to be arms.

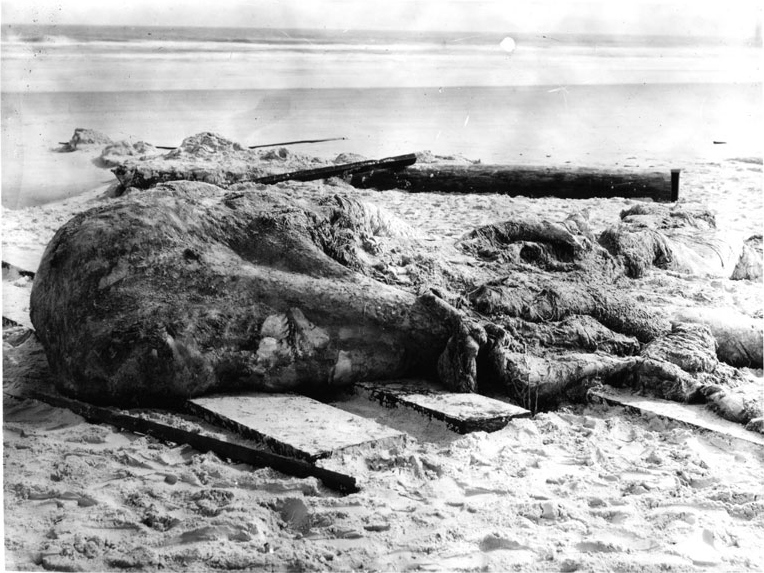
Lateral view of the carcass.

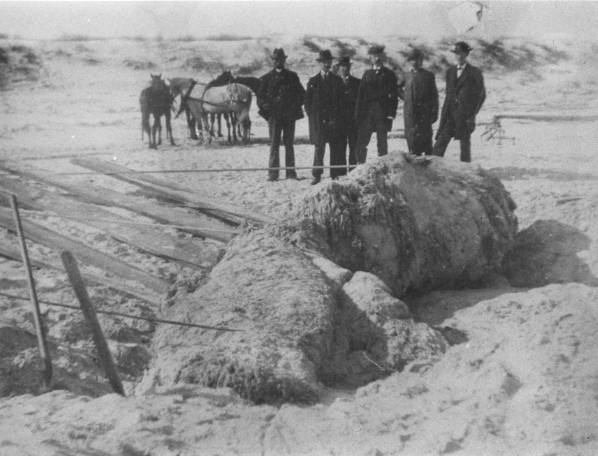
The carcass in the process of being hauled further inland.

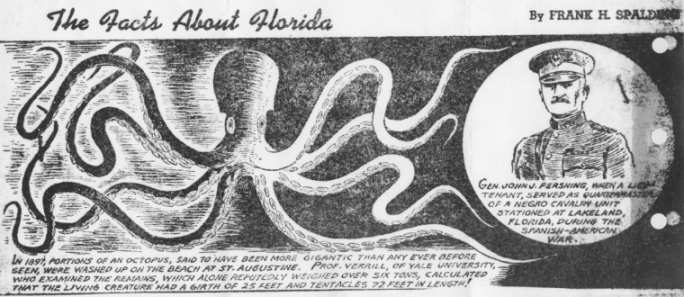
"The Facts About Florida" – the newspaper clipping found by F. G. Wood.

Comparison of the connective tissues of a squid, an octopus, and the St. Augustine carcass, as viewed under polarised light.

=== Initial stranding ===
The carcass was first spotted on the evening of November 30, 1896, by two young boys, Herbert Coles and Dunham Coretter, while bicycling along Anastasia Island. The enormous mass was half buried in the sand, having sunk under its immense weight. The two boys thought the carcass was the remains of a beached whale, as a similar stranding had occurred two years earlier near the mouth of the Matanzas River, located several miles to the south of St. Augustine (see map).

The two boys returned to St. Augustine the same day and reported their discovery to a local physician, Dr. DeWitt Webb. Webb, who was the founder of the St. Augustine Historical Society and Institute of Science, came to the beach the following day, December 1, to examine the remains. He would be the only known person of an academic background to see the specimen in situ.

His first impression was that it was the remains of an animal, very mutilated, and in an advanced state of decomposition. The carcass was very pale pink, almost white, in colour, with a silver reflection in the sunlight. It was composed of a rubbery substance of a very hard consistency, such that it could only be cut with great difficulty. The part of the carcass that was visible measured 18 feet (approx. 6 meters) in length and 7 feet (approx. 2 1/2 meters) in width. Webb estimated its weight at nearly 5 tons, if not more. He believed it was the remains of a giant octopus, as it appeared to have the stumps of four arms, with another arm buried nearby.

A few days later, on December 7, Webb engaged two hobbyists, Edgar Van Horn and Ernest Howatt, to photograph the carcass for posterity. At least two photographs were taken, one of the lateral view and one of the anterior view, showing the apparent arm stumps. The latter also included a man, likely DeWitt Webb himself, for scale. As the images were over-exposed, they were never published. These photographs were for a long time considered lost, and only drawings based on them, made by Alpheus Hyatt Verrill and published in the American Naturalist of April 1897, were known. However, one of the original images, showing the lateral view, was obtained by Gary Mangiacopra in 1994. It is clear that one of Verrill's drawings was based on this photograph. A simplified drawing of this image also appeared in the Hartford Daily Running of February 18, 1897.

Around the same time, a certain Mr. Wilson wrote a memorandum to Webb, communicating the results of his observations made after having dug around the corpse. It read:

One arm lying west of the body, 23 feet long; one stump of arm about 4 feet long; three arms lying south of body and from appearance attached to same (although I did not dig quite to body, as it laid well down in the sand and I was very tired), longest one measured over 23 feet, the other arms were three to five feet shorter.

In the first days of December 1896, Dr. George Grant, owner of a hotel at South Beach on Anastasia Island, wrote a short article describing the carcass, which was published in the Pennsylvania Grit of Williamsport on December 13. The article was accompanied by a picture of the "sea monster" depicting a tentacled creature with a tail. This was drawn by the draughtsman of the newspaper based on Grant's description, and not an eyewitness. Grant's description was as follows:

The head is as large as an ordinary flour barrel, and has the shape of a sea lion head. The neck, if the creature may be said to have a neck, is of the same diameter as the body. The mouth is on the underside of the head and is protected by two tentacle tubes about eight inches in diameter and about 30 feet long. These tubes resemble an elephant's trunk and obviously were used to clutch in a sucker like fashion any object within their reach.

Another tube or tentacle of the same dimensions stands out on the top of the head. Two others, one on each side, protrude from beyond the monster's neck, and extend fully 15 feet along the body and beyond the tail. The tail, which is separated and jagged with cutting points for several feet, is flanked with two more tentacles of the same dimensions as the others and 30 feet long. The eyes are under the back of the mouth instead of over it.

This specimen is so badly cut up by sharks and sawfish that only the stumps of the tentacles remain, but pieces of them were found strewn for some distance on the beach, showing that the animal had a fierce battle with its foes before it was disabled and beached by the surf.

Grant describes the animal as having seven "tentacles" and a "tail". If the "tail" is interpreted as another tentacle, giving a total of eight, this would suggest an octopus as opposed to a decapod, such as the squid or cuttlefish. Furthermore, nothing in the description indicates the presence of the long feeding tentacles found in squid, as the "tentacles" are said to be of the same dimensions.

=== Second stranding ===
Between January 9 and January 15, a storm tide dragged the carcass out to sea, but it washed ashore again on the next tide, on Crescent Beach, two miles to the south of its original location. Webb sent photographs of the mass, along with a description, to Joel Asaph Allen of the Museum of Comparative Zoology at Harvard. Allen apparently did not respond, but Webb's letter came to the attention of Prof. Addison Emery Verrill of Yale, at that time the foremost authority on cephalopods in the country. At first, Verrill suggested the carcass might represent the remains of a giant squid. In the January 1897 issue of the American Journal of Science he wrote:

The proportions [given by Webb] indicate that this might have been a squid-like form, and not an Octopus. The "breadth" is evidently that of the softened and collapsed body, and would represent an actual maximum diameter in life of at least 7 feet and a probable weight of 4 or 5 tons for the body and head. These dimensions are decidedly larger than those of any of the well-authenticated Newfoundland specimens. It is perhaps a species of Architeuthis.

Verrill soon changed his mind about the identity of the creature. In the January 3 issue of the New York Herald, he wrote that the carcass was indeed that of a giant octopus. However, the paper did not state that Verrill was the author of the article. The article read:

Its head was nearly destroyed, and only the stumps of two arms were visible ... The body, as it lies somewhat imbedded in the sand, is 18 feet long and about 7 feet wide, while it rises 3 1/2 feet above the sand ... The weight of the body and head would have been at least four or five tons. If the eight arms held the proportions usually seen in smaller species of the octopus, they would have been at least 75 to 100 feet in length and about 18 inches in diameter at the base.

On January 16, the Tatler, a local news sheet that reported on the visitors to St. Augustine hotels, ran a story about the stranded creature. It restated Verrill's original identification of the carcass as a giant squid. It read:

The wide-spread interest in the very remarkable specimen of the giant squid, now lying on the beach a few miles below the city, is mainly due to its enormous size. It is believed to be the largest specimen ever found. Its great size and immense weight have thus far prevented its being moved for a more careful examination. A dozen men with blocks and tackle not being able even to turn it over. Another effort will be made with more extensive apparatus by which it is hoped to drag it from the pit in which it now lies and placing it higher up on the beach so that a careful and thorough examination in the interest of science can be made and the exact species determined. Professor Verrill of Yale and Profs. True and Dale [Dall] of the Smithsonian are in constant correspondence with Dr. DeWitt Webb, President of the St. Augustine Scientific, Literary and Historical Society, in regard to it. Several photographs have been taken of it, but owing to its position, these have not been satisfactory. Mrs. John L. Wilson believes it to belong to an extinct species. Its hide is three and a half inches thick and its head is covered by a hood that prevents examination. Apparently it is a mass of cartilage and may have been dead in the water many days before it washed ashore on Anastasia Island.

In the February issue of the American Journal of Science, Verrill even gave the animal a scientific name, Octopus giganteus (Verrill, 1897). He also added:

It is possible that it may be related to Cirroteuthis, and in that case the two posterior stumps, looking like arms, may be the remains of the lateral fins, for they seem too far back for the arms, unless pulled out of position. On the other hand, they seem to be too far forward for fins. So that they are probably arms twisted out of their true position.

However, having examined samples of the mass sent to him by Webb, Verrill concluded that "the creature cannot be an Octopus, but is of cetacean nature." He suggested that "the whole mass represents the upper part of the head of [a sperm whale], detached from the skull and jaw."

Webb decided the carcass should be moved further inland so that it would not be lost to the sea forever. With the help of "six horses and strong tackle", it was moved several miles closer to St. Augustine, "to the terminus of a railroad," where it was protected from the tide and drifting sand. Its final resting place was South Beach, Anastasia Island, near the hotel of Dr. George Grant. The St. Augustine carcass became somewhat of a tourist attraction and was visited by large numbers of people. It is unknown what happened to the carcass afterwards.

Photographs of the St. Augustine carcass were for a long time thought to be lost, and drawings remained the only pictorial evidence of the event. They were finally rediscovered in 1993 by Marjorie Blakoner of California, who recognised them in an old album. Van Lockwood, one of the original photographers of the St. Augustine carcass, kept an album of photos he had taken between 1885 and 1899. Upon his death, this was bequeathed to the St. Augustine Historical Society and Institute of Science and later fell into the possession of Marjorie Blakoner.

== Analyses ==
=== 1971 analysis ===
The St. Augustine carcass was largely forgotten until 1957, when Forrest Glenn Wood, a curator at the Marineland of Florida and a founding member of the International Society of Cryptozoology, became interested in the story after finding a yellowed newspaper clipping mentioning the creature. Entitled "The Facts About Florida," it read:

In 1897, portions of an octopus, said to have been more gigantic than any ever before seen, were washed up on the beach at St. Augustine. Prof. Verrill, of Yale University, who examined the remains, which alone reputedly weighed over six tons, calculated that the living creature had a girth of 25 feet and tentacles 72 feet in length!

He learned that a sample of the integument was preserved in the Smithsonian Institution, and persuaded the curators to send a portion of the sample to his colleague, Dr. Joseph F. Gennaro Jr., a cell biologist at the University of Florida. Gennaro compared the connective tissue of the St. Augustine carcass to control specimens from known octopus and squid species. He published his findings in the March 1971 issue of Natural History:

Now differences between the contemporary squid and octopus samples became very clear. In the octopus, broad bands of fibers passed across the plane of the tissue and were separated by equally broad bands arranged in a perpendicular direction. In the squid there were narrower but also relatively broad bundles arranged in the plane of the section, separated by thin partitions of perpendicular fibers.

It seemed I had found a means to identify the mystery sample after all. I could distinguish between octopus and squid, and between them and mammals, which display a lacy network of connective tissue fibers.

After 75 years, the moment of truth was at hand. Viewing section after section of the St. Augustine samples, we decided at once, and beyond any doubt, that the sample was not whale blubber. Further, the connective tissue pattern was that of broad bands in the plane of the section with equally broad bands arranged perpendicularly, a structure similar to, if not identical with, that in my octopus sample.

The evidence appears unmistakable that the St. Augustine sea monster was in fact an octopus, but the implications are fantastic. Even though the sea presents us from time to time with strange and astonishing phenomena, the idea of a gigantic octopus, with arms 75 to 100 feet in length and about 18 inches in diameter at the base—a total spread of some 200 feet—is difficult to comprehend.

=== 1986 analysis ===
Roy Mackal, a biochemist at the University of Chicago and a founding member of the International Society of Cryptozoology (as was F. G. Wood), decided to test the samples himself. In an issue of Cryptozoology in 1986, he wrote, "Gennaro carried out comparative histological examination of the tissue, and concluded that it most resembled contemporary octopus tissue. While these results were highly suggestive, further biochemical work was required for an unambiguous identification of the tissue." Mackal tested samples of the St. Augustine carcass for different amino acids and compared the results with the known amino acid composition of the tissues of a spotted dolphin, a beluga, a giant squid, and two species of octopus.

Comparative amino acid compositions of several species
sample	1M	2M	3M	4M	5M	6M
aspartic acid	10.5	5.9	10.5	11.7	10.3	10.5
threonine	4.6	2.5	4.9	5.4	4.8	4.6
serine	7.1	3.9	6.0	5.8	5.5	8.0
glutamic acid	17.7	8.8	14.2	16.6	12.6	16.7
hydroxyproline	not made	not made	not made	not made	not made	not made
proline	4.7	16.8	6.3	4.7	6.5	4.3
glycine	10.6	34.6	19.2	11.5	20.0	14.2
alanine	7.5	13.4	8.6	9.5	8.6	7.6
valine	6.6	2.4	4.8	5.5	5.3	6.4
methionine	2.2	0.4	1.9	2.2	1.9	2.1
isoleucine	5.1	1.2	4.9	5.9	5.4	4.6
leucine	10.7	2.9	7.8	10.0	8.1	10.4
tyrosine	1.2	0.0	0.7	0.6	0.5	1.4
phenylalanine	3.1	1.5	2.6	3.0	3.2	3.5
histidine	0.3	0.0	+	+	0.2	+
lysine	1.6	0.0	1.0	0.9	0.8	0.5
arginine	6.4	5.8	6.6	6.7	6.5	5.2
hydroxylysine	0.0	0.0	0.0	0.0	0.0	0.0

+: less than 0.1%

Identification of the samples:
1M: Stenella plagiodon (dolphin)
2M: Octopus giganteus (monster of Florida)
3M, 4M, 5M: arm, mantle and fin of Architeuthis dux (giant squid)
6M: Delphinapterus leucas (beluga or white whale)

Comparative Cu and Fe compositions of several species
sample	Weight (mg)	Cu (ppm)	Fe (ppm)	Cu/Fe
1M	12.8	300	1600	0.19
2M	29.1	60	200	0.30
4M	5.6	240	560	0.43
6M	10.5	330	470	0.70

Identification of the samples:
1M: Stenella plagiodon (dolphin)
2M: Octopus giganteus (monster of Florida)
4M: mantle of Architeuthis dux (giant squid)
6M: Delphinapterus leucas (beluga or white whale)

He published his findings in Cryptozoology:

On the basis of Gennaro's histological studies and the present amino acid and Cu and Fe analyses, I conclude that, to the extent the preserved O. giganteus tissue is representative of the carcass washed ashore at St. Augustine, Florida, in November 1896, it was essentially a huge mass of collagenous protein. Certainly, the tissue was not blubber. I interpret these results as consistent with, and supportive of, Webb and Verrill's identification of the carcass as that of a gigantic cephalopod, probably an octopus, not referable to any known species.

=== 1995 analysis ===
Samples of the St. Augustine carcass were again examined in 1995. They were subjected to electron microscopy and biochemical analysis in what was the most thorough examination of the preserved material to date. The results of the analyses, published in the Biological Bulletin, disputed the earlier findings of Gennaro and Mackal. These are shown in the following table:

Transmission electron micrographs of sections of the Bermuda Blob (left) and St. Augustine carcass.

Comparative amino acid compositions of skin collagens of several species and the Bermuda and St. Augustine carcasses (values are amino acid residues/1000 residues)
Amino acid	Bermuda carcass	St. Augustine carcass	Octopus mantle^{1}	Squid mantle^{2}	Carp^{3}	Whale skin^{4}	Shark skin^{5}
Asp	52	50	53	58	48	46	43
Thr	27	28	28	26	25	24	23
Ser	47	45	52	47	43	41	61
OH-Pro	79	54	95	89	82	89	60
Pro	88	169	101	96	117	128	106
Glu	83	82	64	86	69	70	68
Gly	339	330	324	308	326	326	338
Ala	113	106	100	89	119	111	106
Val	25	18	19	21	18	21	25
Cys	0	0	8	4	0	0	0
Met	0	0	6	8	14	5	18
Ileu	14	11	22	21	11	11	15
Leu	32	28	30	32	22	25	25
Tyr	0	0	5	5	3	4	3
Phe	16	14	8	12	14	13	13
OH-Lys	13.1	15.3	15.7	16.1	7.1	6	5.5
Lys	10	0.4	11	15	25	26	27
His	6	4	3	7	5	6	13
Arg	55	48	58	59	52	50	51

^{1} Pepsin-extracted collagen from Octopus vulgaris body wall.
^{2} Pepsin-extracted collagen from Todarodes pacificus body wall.
^{3} Gelatin from skin.
^{4} Whale skin gelatin, species not reported.
^{5} 0.5 M acetic-acid-extracted skin collagen from Squalus acanthus.

The samples were found to be "masses of virtually pure collagen" and not to have the "biochemical characteristics of invertebrate collagen, nor the collagen fiber arrangement of octopus mantle." The results suggest the samples are "the remains of the skin of an enormous warm-blooded vertebrate." The authors conclude that "there is no evidence to support the existence of Octopus giganteus" and concur with Verrill (1897) and Lucas (1897) that the St. Augustine carcass was "the remains of a whale, likely the entire skin [blubber layer] . . . nothing more or less."

=== 2004 analysis ===
Tissue samples of the St. Augustine Monster were re-examined in 2004 for comparison with the more recently discovered Chilean Blob. Sections were observed with an electron microscope, underwent biochemical analyses, and DNA extraction was attempted but extraction of useful DNA from the sample failed. The results of the study confirmed the findings in the 1995 analysis (Pierce et al. 1995) that the blobs were made of collagen, and were definitively the remains of whale carcasses.

Transmission electron micrographs of sections of tissue from (A) the St. Augustine carcass, (B) Bermuda Blob 1, (C) Tasmanian West Coast Monster, (D) Bermuda Blob 2, (E) Nantucket Blob, and (F) Humpback whale blubber.

Comparative amino acid compositions of the blob tissue samples following acid hydrolysis (values are amino acid residues/1000 residues)
Amino acid	Chilean	St Augustine^{a}	Bermuda 1^{a}	Bermuda 2	Tasmanian	Nantucket
Asp	28	50	52	42	31	45
Thr	22	28	27	19	19	23
Ser	40	45	47	36	50	35
OH-Pro	90	54	79	113	84	146
Pro	213	169	88	182	92	136
Glu	63	82	83	62	78	63
Gly	314	330	339	298	363	280
Ala	96	106	113	94	133	94
Val	13	18	25	21	22	22
Cys	0	0	0	0	0	0
Met	4	0	0	3	1	3
Ile	8	11	14	10	11	11
Leu	25	28	32	23	30	25
Tyr	3	0	0	0	0	6
Phe	12	14	16	12	15	14
OH-Lys	11	15	13	26	7	20
Lys	21	0.4	10	18	12	25
His	6	4	6	0	0	8
Arg	29	48	55	42	51	45

^{a} Data taken from Pierce et al., 1995.

== Timeline ==
Timeline of the St. Augustine Monster

== See also ==
- Cephalopod size, an overview of the largest known cephalopod species
- Drift whale, a cetacean mammal that has died at sea and floated into shore
- Giant octopuses, members of the genus Enteroctopus
- Seven-arm octopus, the largest known species of octopus based on scientific records
- Lusca, a tentacled sea monster in Caribbean folklore
