= Chilean blob =

Whale carcass globster

The Chilean Blob as it was found on Pinuno Beach in July 2003

The Chilean blob or Chilean monster (Spanish: Monstruo chileno) was a large globster (mass of organic tissue) found on Pinuno Beach in Los Muermos, Chile, in July 2003. It weighed 13 tonnes (14 tons) and measured 12 metres (39 ft) across. The Chilean blob made headlines around the world because biologists were initially unable to identify it and were speculating that it was the remains of some species of giant octopus previously unknown to science. The blob was the subject of a number of conspiracy theories.

In June 2004, although no cells remained in the blob, fragments of the DNA found in the blob were found to match that of a sperm whale. The blob was a large mass of adipose tissue, the partial remains of a dead sperm whale. Scientists concluded that the whale had died several months prior and that its carcass had been eaten until only its tough collagen fibres remained.
