= Globster =

Unidentified organic mass that washes up on the shore of a body of water

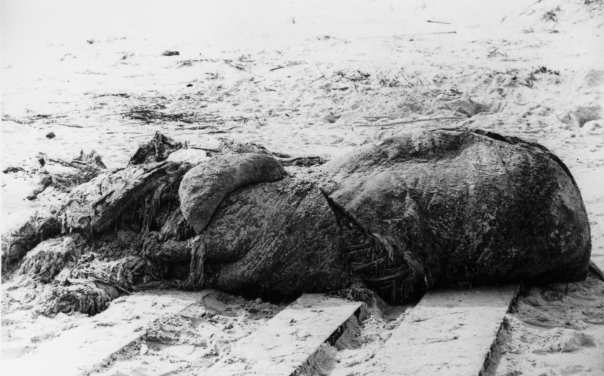
The "St. Augustine Monster", a carcass that washed ashore near St. Augustine, Florida, in 1896

A globster or blob is an unidentified organic mass that washes up on the shoreline of an ocean or other body of water. A globster is distinguished from a normal beached carcass by being hard to identify, at least by initial untrained observers, and by creating controversy as to its identity.

== History ==
The term "globster" was coined by Ivan T. Sanderson in 1962 to describe the Tasmanian carcass of 1960, which was said to have "no visible eyes, no defined head, and no apparent bone structure." Other sources simply use the term "blob".

Many globsters have initially been described as resembling gigantic octopuses, though they later turned out to be decayed carcasses of whales or large sharks. As with the "Chilean Blob" of 2003, many are masses of whale blubber released from decaying whale corpses. Others initially thought to be dead plesiosaurs, such as the Zuiyo-maru carcass, later turned out to be the decayed carcasses of basking sharks.

Some globsters were examined only after they had decomposed too much and seemed to represent evidence of a new species, or were destroyed—as happened with the "Cadborosaurus willsi" carcass, found in 1937. However, Canadian scientists did analyse the DNA of the Newfoundland Blob—which revealed that the tissue was from a sperm whale. In their resulting paper, the authors point out a number of superficial similarities between the Newfoundland Blob and other globsters, concluding a similar origin for those globsters is likely. Analyses of other globsters have yielded similar results.

== Notable globsters ==
A sketch of the Stronsay Beast

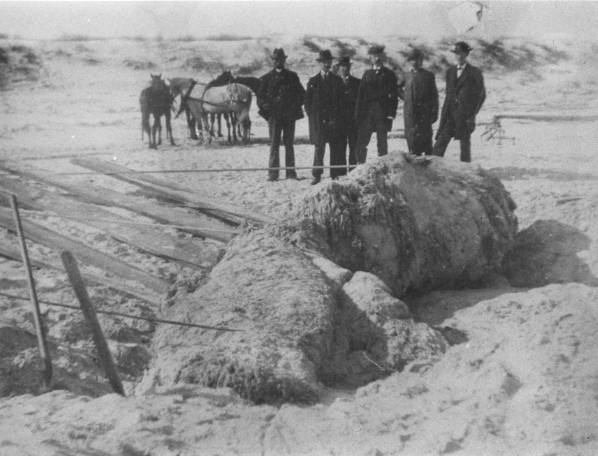
The partially excavated carcass of the St. Augustine Monster

The following is a chronological list of carcasses that have been described as globsters or blobs in the literature:

- Stronsay Beast (1808)—believed to be a basking shark carcass
- St. Augustine Monster (1896)—identified as a whale carcass
- Trunko (1924)—not identified, possibly a whale
- Tasmanian Globster (1960)—identified as a whale carcass
- New Zealand Globster (1965)—identified as a whale carcass
- Zuiyo-maru carcass (1977)—most likely the carcass of a basking shark
- Bermuda Blob (1988)—identified as a whale carcass
- Nantucket Blob (1996)—identified as a whale carcass
- Bermuda Blob 2 (1997)—identified as a whale carcass
- Chilean Blob (2003)—identified as a whale carcass
- Montauk Monster (2008)—believed to be a partially decomposed raccoon

== See also ==
- Drift whale, a carcass that washes up on shore
- Exploding whale
- Panama Creature
