= Lusca =

Cryptid in Caribbean folklore

In Caribbean folklore, the Lusca is a name given to an alleged cryptid said to exist in the region of the blue holes near Andros, an island in the Bahamas.

== History ==
The first reported sighting of something resembling the traditional description of the Lusca was in 1872, when J. S. George of Nassau in the Bahamas wrote to The American Naturalist claiming that a ten-foot-long (3 m) octopus carcass was discovered, which had a mass of approximately 200 to 300 pounds (91 to 136 kg) and possessed tentacles stretching to a length of five feet (1.5 m). It was purportedly found deceased on the beach, with indications that the animal had succumbed to injuries. During a stay on the island of Andros, marine biologist Bruce S. Wright was told by a local guide that some limestone caverns beneath a lake were home to a monster called the Lusca, described as a large half-octopus/half-dragon animal with powerful sucker-tipped tentacles, which lived in both banana holes (Note: A banana hole is a type of karst cave that originally forms underground and whose ceiling collapses, opening a depression in the landscape. They are so named because the soil at the bottom was historically used for banana cultivation.) and blue holes. The first description of a "giant scuttle" from the Bahamas was published in 1957, and was alleged to have been witnessed between Hole-in-the-Wall Lighthouse and Nassau, purportedly possessing an exaggerated arm span of 200 feet (61 m), with stories of arm spans between 60 and 80 feet (18 and 24 m) not being uncommon.

== Etymology ==
Lusca is a clipped form of Mollusca (a phylum containing octopus, squid, cuttlefish, and other cephalopods), referring to the creature's varied molluscan features, such as tentacles.

== Description ==
It is described as a giant octopus, a giant cuttlefish, or a half-shark/half-octopus. The Lusca is said to grow over 75 ft (23 m) long, but there has been no scientific evidence of any octopus species approaching lengths of this magnitude. Diver George J. Benjamin of Toronto, who had spent years exploring the blue holes of Andros, also mentioned lore surrounding the Lusca in a 1970 National Geographic article. During the 1950s, one of his guides had warned him that the Lusca, or "Him of the Hands", would kill him if he entered the oceanic blue holes, and regaled him with stories of Luscas sinking ships and grabbing fishermen. Benjamin did not encounter the Lusca, but throughout the 1970s, various articles and documentaries on the blue holes confirmed the sentiment among locals that giant cephalopod-like monsters, called Lusca or "Him of the Hairy Hands," were thought to inhabit these sinkholes.

== In popular culture ==
Reports of the alleged animal attacking swimmers and divers were investigated by Jeremy Wade, the host of the television series River Monsters, in the episode "Terror in Paradise" (season eight, episode four). After investigating reef sharks, tiger sharks, and the giant Pacific octopus during the course of the episode, Wade speculates that a large octopus is, in his view, a likely culprit.

A Caribbean film festival, Lusca Fantastic Film Fest, was named after this sea monster; the festival is an annual event held in Puerto Rico. It is the first and only international fantastic film festival in the Caribbean.

The survival video game Stranded Deep features an enemy giant squid named Lusca the Great.

The massively multiplayer game City of Heroes features a giant monster squid named Lusca, which spawns at irregular intervals in the Independence Port region of the game world. Defeating Lusca for the first time earns the Devilfish (Note: An alternate historical name for octopuses was "devilfish".) badge.

In episode 8 of series 15 of the detective show Death in Paradise, a man obsessed with the creature is found dead in the ocean, his body bearing marks that look like he may have been bound up by its tentacles, although the cause of death is rather more mundane.

== See also ==
- Kraken – Mythical sea cryptid
- St. Augustine Monster – Carcass found in Florida, US in 1896
- Sharktopus – 2010 American television film
