= National Animal Health Laboratory Network =

The National Animal Health Laboratory Network (NAHLN) is a network of federal and state resources intended to enable a rapid and sufficient response to animal health emergencies. The concept of the NAHLN reconfigures animal health diagnostic services in the United States by positioning National Veterinary Services Laboratory as the lead U.S. animal health laboratory and allowing select laboratories operated by state and university officials to cooperate in foreign animal disease surveillance and related services.
