= National Veterinary Services Laboratory =

The National Veterinary Services Laboratories (NVSL) provides laboratory services for the US Department of Agriculture's Animal and Plant Health Inspection Service (APHIS). It operates from Ames, Iowa and Plum Island Animal Disease Center at Plum Island (New York). The NVSL provides a wide variety of information and services, centered on diagnosis of domestic and foreign animal diseases, support of disease control and eradication programs, reagents for diagnostic testing, training, and laboratory certification.

== History ==
Originally, the USDA's national veterinary diagnostic laboratory functions were part of its Bureau of Animal Industry.

In 1961, the National Animal Disease Laboratory (NADL) opened in Ames, Iowa. The NADL (later renamed the National Animal Disease Center, or NADC) contained research and regulatory laboratories. The regulatory laboratories provided diagnostic services for the Animal Disease Eradication Division and biologics evaluations for the Animal Inspection and Quarantine Division.

A few years later, reorganization resulted in three independent units: research, biologics, and diagnostics. The biologics group was physically located outside of the NADL facilities. In 1971, diagnostic services were aligned with the Animal Health Division (AHD) laboratory facilities in Beltsville, Maryland.

In 1973, the Biologics and Diagnostic Services Laboratories were brought back together under one Director and named the Veterinary Services Laboratories, part of the new Animal and Plant Health Inspection Service (APHIS).

In December 1977, the unit's name changed to the National Veterinary Services Laboratories (NVSL). Plans were made for construction of new facilities as growth continued. Phase 1 of the plan was completed in 1978, and the biologics, administrative, and support functions moved into the new building. That year, APHIS closed its diagnostic facilities in Beltsville, Maryland, and the veterinary diagnostic functions moved to Ames.

In 1984, diagnostic activities at the Plum Island Animal Disease Center located on Plum Island, New York, were transferred to APHIS supervision. Named the Foreign Animal Disease Diagnostic Laboratory, it became part of the NVSL.

Biologics testing activities split from the NVSL in 1996, joining biologics licensing and inspection activities to form the Center for Veterinary Biologics (CVB). The NVSL now focus exclusively on diagnostic services.

A modernized and consolidated facility for animal health research, diagnosis, and product evaluation, co-locating the NADC, NVSL-Ames, and CVB, was completed in 2009. The facility includes high- and low-containment large animal facilities (BSL-3Ag and BSL-2Ag, respectively) and a consolidated laboratory and administrative facility.
