= Texas Energy Engineers =

ccrd partners
- Company type: Private
- Industry: Engineering
- Founded: 1980
- Founder: David B. Duthu, P.E. Kermit S. Harmon, P.E., C.E.M., C.C.P., D.G.C.P.,
- Headquarters: Houston, Texas, United States
- Number of locations: Austin, Dallas, Denver, Houston, Kansas City, Miami, Nashville, Phoenix, Richmond and Washington, D.C.
- Key people: Richard L. Rome, P.E., President & Board Principal David B. Duthu, P.E., Board Principal George A. Campbell, P.E., Board Principal
- Services: Mechanical, Electrical, Fire Protection, Commissioning and Energy/Sustainability
- Number of employees: 180

Texas Energy Engineers, Inc., dba ccrd partners, is a professional engineering firm headquartered in Houston, TX (USA).

The firm employs over 180 personnel, most being engineers in the disciplines of Mechanical and Electrical engineering. ccrd’s practice is focused on energy and sustainable engineering design and commissioning for healthcare facilities, science and technology facilities and data facilities for public and private industry sectors. ccrd has completed professional engineering services on structures valued in excess of $20 billion.

== History ==
The firm was founded in 1980 as Texas Energy Engineers and incorporated October 6 by David B. Duthu, P.E. (a native of Houma, Louisiana and graduate of Texas A&M University) and partner Kermit S. Harmon, P.E., C.E.M., C.C.P., D.G.C.P., (a native of Paris, Texas).

In 1985, the firm expanded operations to Dallas, Texas by providing assistance with the orderly termination of business and closing of the office of William K. Hall & Associates.

In 1988, the practice was expanded to include the acquisition of the Dallas office of Adam, Shadrick, Davis, Inc. (ASD) that was led by George Campbell, P.E. (a native of Illinois and graduate of University of Illinois) and Richard L. Rome, P.E. (a native of Kansas, and graduate of the University of Kansas). That same year Kermit resigned and is no longer active in the firm.

The acronym ‘ccrd’ is derived from the last names of the primary stockholders of the company at the time of the acquisition (Campbell, Colburn, Rome, Duthu). Colburn is no longer active in the firm.

Between 2002 through 2011, the firm expanded its national reach by opening additional offices in Richmond, Virginia; Miami, Florida; Austin, Texas; Nashville, Tennessee; Phoenix, Arizona; Denver, Colorado; Kansas City, Missouri; and Washington, DC.

ccrd has expanded its global experience to include projects in Japan, Aruba, Saudi Arabia, Libya, UAE, Denmark, Germany, Brazil the United Kingdom, and the Czech Republic.

== Project Experience ==
ccrd has designed over 2,000,000 sq. ft. of biological/microbiological containment laboratories, ranging from BSL-2 through BSL-4, and agricultural biosafety labs (ABSL) for biosafety level 3E and 3 Ag operations.

ccrd's current and recent science and technology projects include:

- Galveston National Laboratory (GNL), Galveston, Texas
- National Bio and Agro Defense Facility (NBAF), Manhattan, Kansas
- National Biodefense and Countermeasures Center (NBACC), Fort Detrick, Maryland
- New England Regional Biosafety Laboratory (NE-RBL) Tufts University, Grafton, Massachusetts

ccrd’s healthcare practice has designed in excess of 17,000,000 sq. ft. of hospital space, including some of the most energy conserving and sustainable hospitals operating to date. ccrd engineered Dell Children’s Medical Center of Central Texas, the world’s first LEED Platinum hospital located in Austin, Texas.

ccrd's current and recent healthcare projects include:

- Miami Children's Hospital, Miami, Florida;
- Winchester Medical Center, Winchester, Virginia
- University of Virginia Battle Building Children's Hospital, Charlottesville, Virginia
