= Panama Creature =

Carcass of a sloth found in 2009

- One of the original photographs of the Panama Creature, with a Telemetro.com watermark

Creature information
- Other name(s): Panama Monster, Panama ET, other names
- Similar entities: Montauk Monster, brown-throated sloth

Origin
- First attested: September 2009
- Country: Panama

The "Panama Creature" (also variously referred to as the "Panama Monster", "Panama ET" "Cerro Azul Monster", "Blue Stream Monster" or "Blue Hill Horror") refers to a carcass photographed near the town of Cerro Azul, Panama, in September 2009. After the animal was discovered and reputedly killed by a group of panicked teenagers, photographs of the corpse were given to Telemetro, a Panamanian television station. The story and pictures circulated, and comparisons to the Montauk Monster were made. There was speculation about the identity of the creature, with suggestions including a hairless sloth, an alien species and a creature new to science. A biopsy performed by the National Environmental Authority of Panama on the remains a few days after the creature's discovery concluded that the corpse was in fact that of a male brown-throated sloth. The odd appearance had been caused by underwater decomposition, which had resulted in hair loss. Once identified, the corpse was buried.

== Events ==
A group of four or five teenagers aged between 14 and 16 claim to have been playing near a cave in Cerro Azul, Panama, when the creature emerged. They say that it approached them, and, fearing for their safety, they attacked the creature with sticks and rocks, killing it. They claim that they then threw its corpse into a pool of water before leaving the area. They later returned and took photographs of the creature's corpse, before sending the pictures to Telemetro, a Panamanian television station. According to some sources, subsequent photographs were taken of the creature after it had further decomposed; however, doubts have been expressed about whether the later photos were of the same specimen. A few days after the photographs were taken, one of the teenagers gave a different account in an interview with Telemetro Reporta, saying "I was in the river and I felt something grabbing my legs ... We took it out of the water and started throwing rocks and sticks at it. We had never seen anything like that." The photographs show a pale creature that is mostly hairless, with a rubbery body. It has "revolting features"; a snub-nose and long arms. Writers for the Huffington Post said that while the head is clearly animal, the torso is "strange", while the limbs are reminiscent of thin human arms. Writers for WBALTV.com compared it to both a "small, portly" version of the alien in E.T. the Extra-Terrestrial and The Lord of the Rings's Gollum's "long-lost cousin".

== Speculation ==
The story and the photographs circulated the Internet, including various cryptozoology blogs, with a great amount of speculation about possible explanations. A video showing the original photographs, as well as some footage of the further decomposed corpse, became very popular on the web, being one of the most viewed videos over the course of a day. In addition to its prevalence on the Internet, the story was covered on television and radio. Comparisons were drawn to the Montauk Monster found in Montauk, New York, in June 2008. A popular theory was that the Panama Creature was a sloth (perhaps an albino) that had somehow became hairless; proponents of the hypothesis cited the hooked claw visible in one of the photographs. Science author Darren Naish, writing for ScienceBlogs, supported the sloth hypothesis, but had a "difficult time" explaining the creature's hairlessness. The sloth theory was generally considered most credible; in 1996, similar photographs were taken of a creature found on the coast between Panama and Costa Rica that was later confirmed to be a sloth that had started to decay. Further Internet speculation led to some proposing that it was in fact a dolphin or a pit bull terrier, an example of a species previously unknown to science, or some sort of genetic mutation. Some Panamanian zoologists said that it appeared to be a fetus of some kind. In addition to naturalistic explanations, Billy Booth of About.com reported that "there has been speculation that it is alien, and thereby the connection to UFOs, undersea bases, the whole ball of wax".

== Necropsy ==
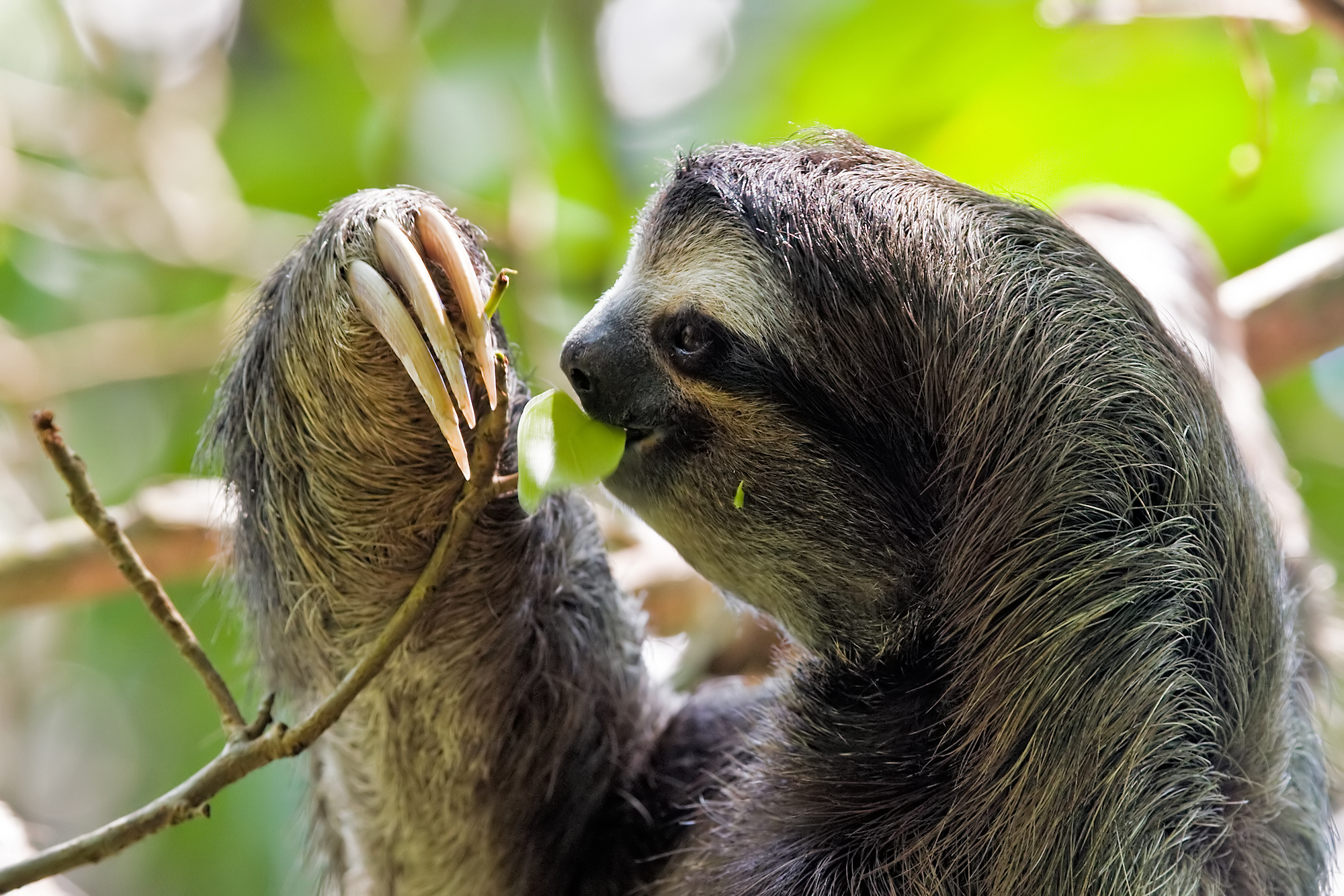
The Panama Creature was shown to be a decomposing brown-throated sloth.

The creature's corpse was recovered four days after the encounter, and a biopsy was performed by the National Environmental Authority of Panama (ANAM). The biopsy concluded that the corpse was in fact a male brown-throated sloth, a species common in the area. André Sena Maia, a veterinarian who works at Niterói Zoo, Rio de Janeiro, Brazil, explained that "most people know how a dead animal looks like in a dry environment", and claimed that "the body must have got stuck under the water, and the movement of the currents gave the false impression that it was alive." A necropsy revealed that severe trauma had been inflicted on the body of the sloth, and Melquiades Ramos, a specialist from the ANAM Department of Protected Areas, estimated that the body had been in the water for "about two days" prior to discovery. The hairlessness was probably caused by the fact it was submerged in water, which can lead to acceleration of fur loss, resulting in smooth skin. A post-mortem bloating further contributed to the unusual appearance of the corpse. After the sloth was identified, its body was buried by ANAM staff.

== See also ==
- Globster
- Montauk Monster
