= Cerro Azul, Panama =

Mountainous part of Panama Province

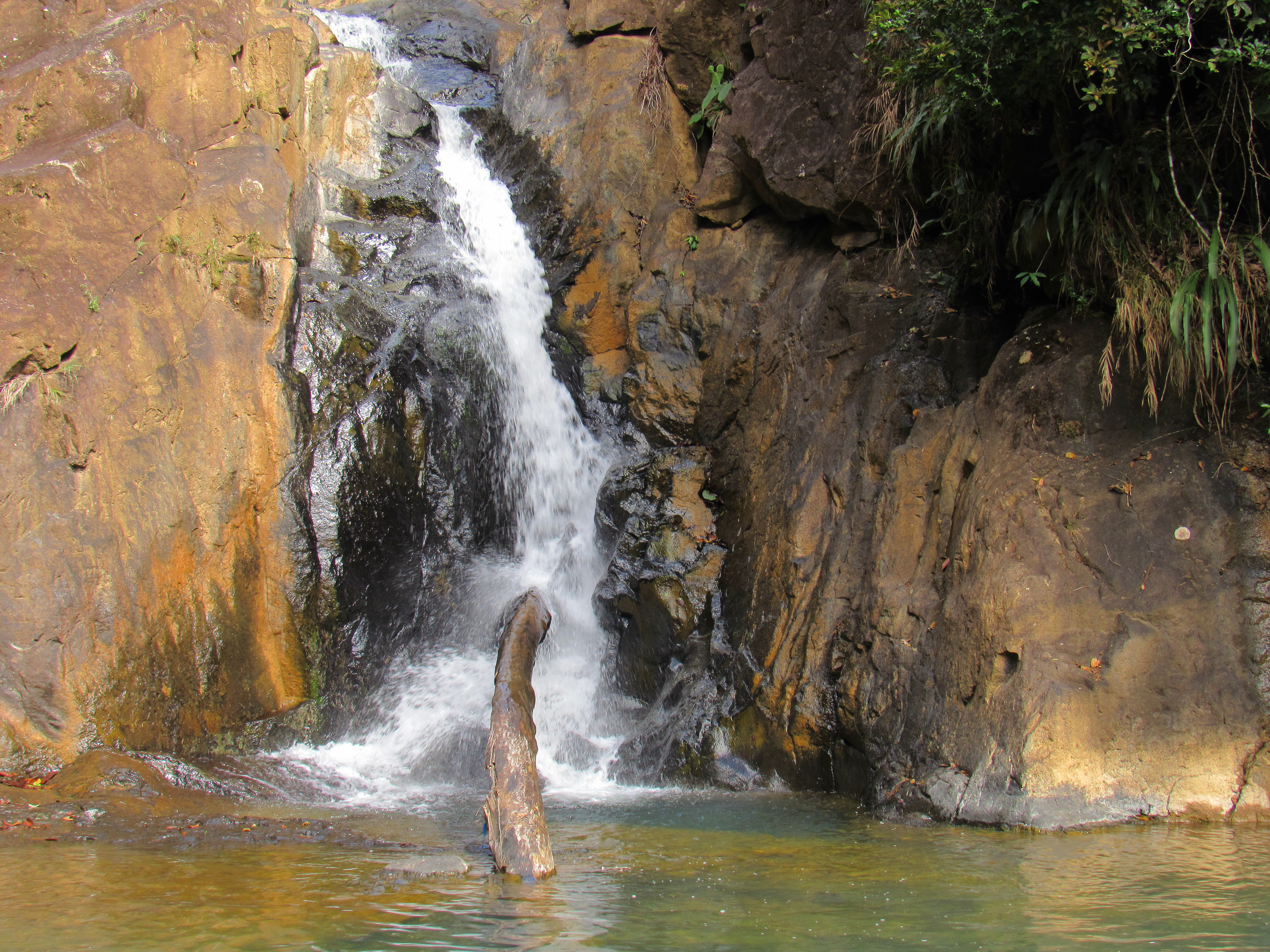
Chorro "El Vigía"

Cerro Azul (Blue Hill) is a mountainous part of Panama Province. There is a well marked road leading to Cerro Azul from the 24 de Diciembre town of the Panama District of Panama City. The mountains reach an altitude of 1007 meters (Cerro Jefe). Cerro Azul includes several villages including Rancho Cafe, Buena Vista, Las Vistas, Las Nubes and Los Altos. There is a lake on the main route to Cerro Azul where spectacled caimans have been spotted. The climate of Cerro Azul is pretty cool and it is a preferred weekend retreat for wealthy city dwellers wanting to escape the heat. Cerro Azul is an important poultry farming area, the Panamanian chicken and egg producer has its production headquarters in Cerro Azul. Las Nubes and Los Altos de Cerro Azul have notable expatriate communities. Cerro Azul has gotten global media coverage after the "Cerro Azul monster" discovery.
