= Plum Island (New York) =

Island in New York, United States

Native name: Manittuwond
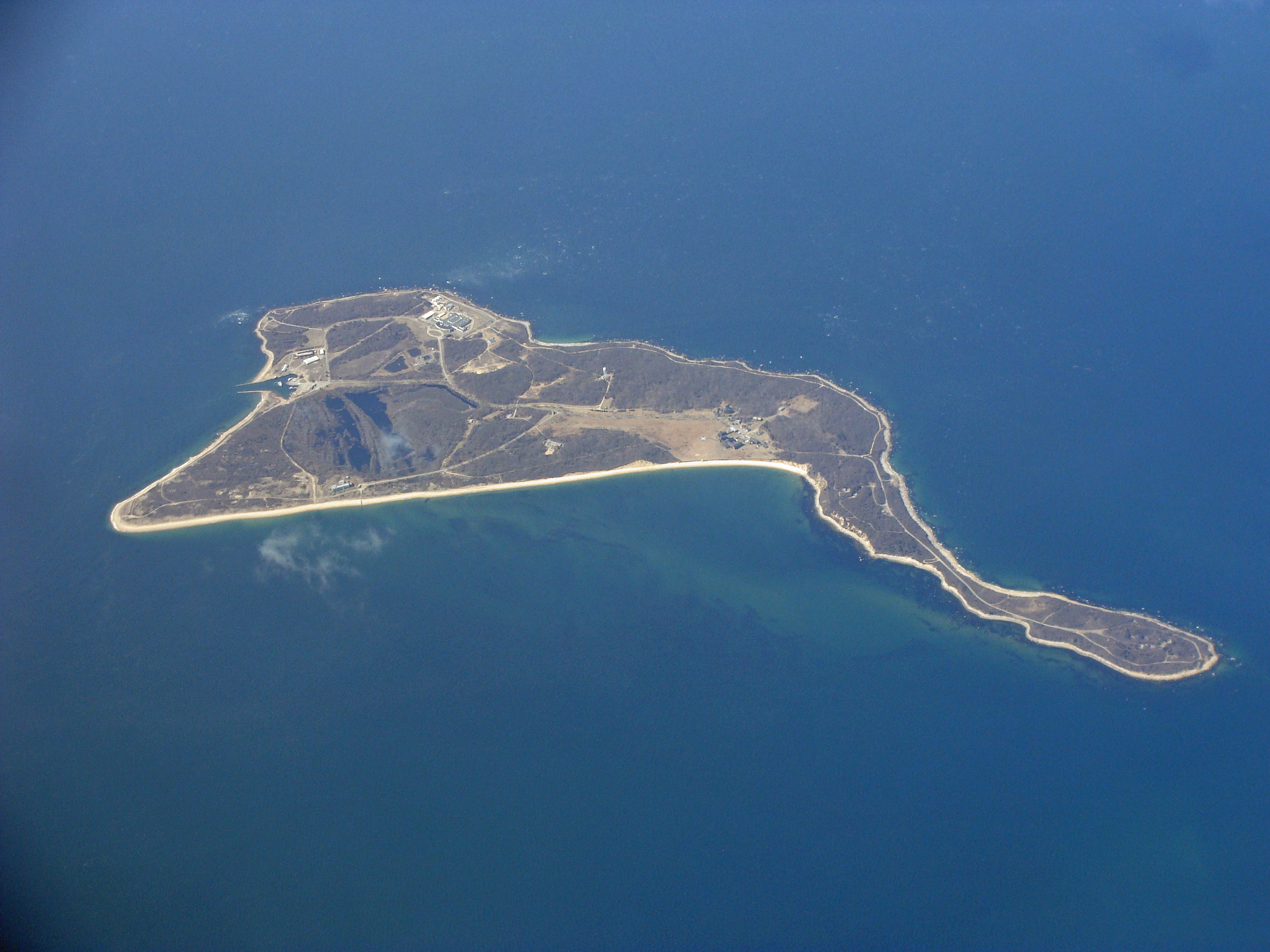

- Location within New York

Geography
- Location: Block Island Sound/Long Island Sound
- Coordinates: 41°10′59″N 72°11′25″W
- Total islands: 1
- Area: 840 acres (340 ha)
- Length: 3 mi (5 km)
- Width: 1 mi (2 km)

Administration
- United States
- State: New York
- County: Suffolk

Plum Island is an island in the town of Southold in Suffolk County, New York. The island is situated in Gardiners Bay, east of Orient Point, off the eastern end of the North Fork coast of Long Island. It is about 3 miles (4.8 km) long and 1 mile (1.6 km) wide at its widest point.

Plum Island is the site of the Plum Island Animal Disease Center (PIADC), which was established by the United States Department of Agriculture (USDA) in 1954. The Island is also the site of the former U.S. military installation Fort Terry (c. 1897), and the historic Plum Island Light (c. 1869), and its automated replacement.

Plum Island is owned in its entirety by the United States government, which was considering sale of the island, but suspended the plan in February 2012. Access to the island is controlled by the United States Department of Homeland Security (DHS).

On August 29, 2013, the United States General Services Administration (GSA) and United States Department of Homeland Security (DHS) announced a final "Record of Decision (ROD): Public Sale of Plum Island, New York".

After years of pressure from organizations including the Preserve Plum Island Coalition (PPIC), the Connecticut Fund for the Environment, along with its permanent regional program Save the Sound and Soundkeeper, Inc., Congress voted in December 2020 to block the sale and preserve Plum Island. In 2020, President Donald Trump signed the legislation.

== History ==
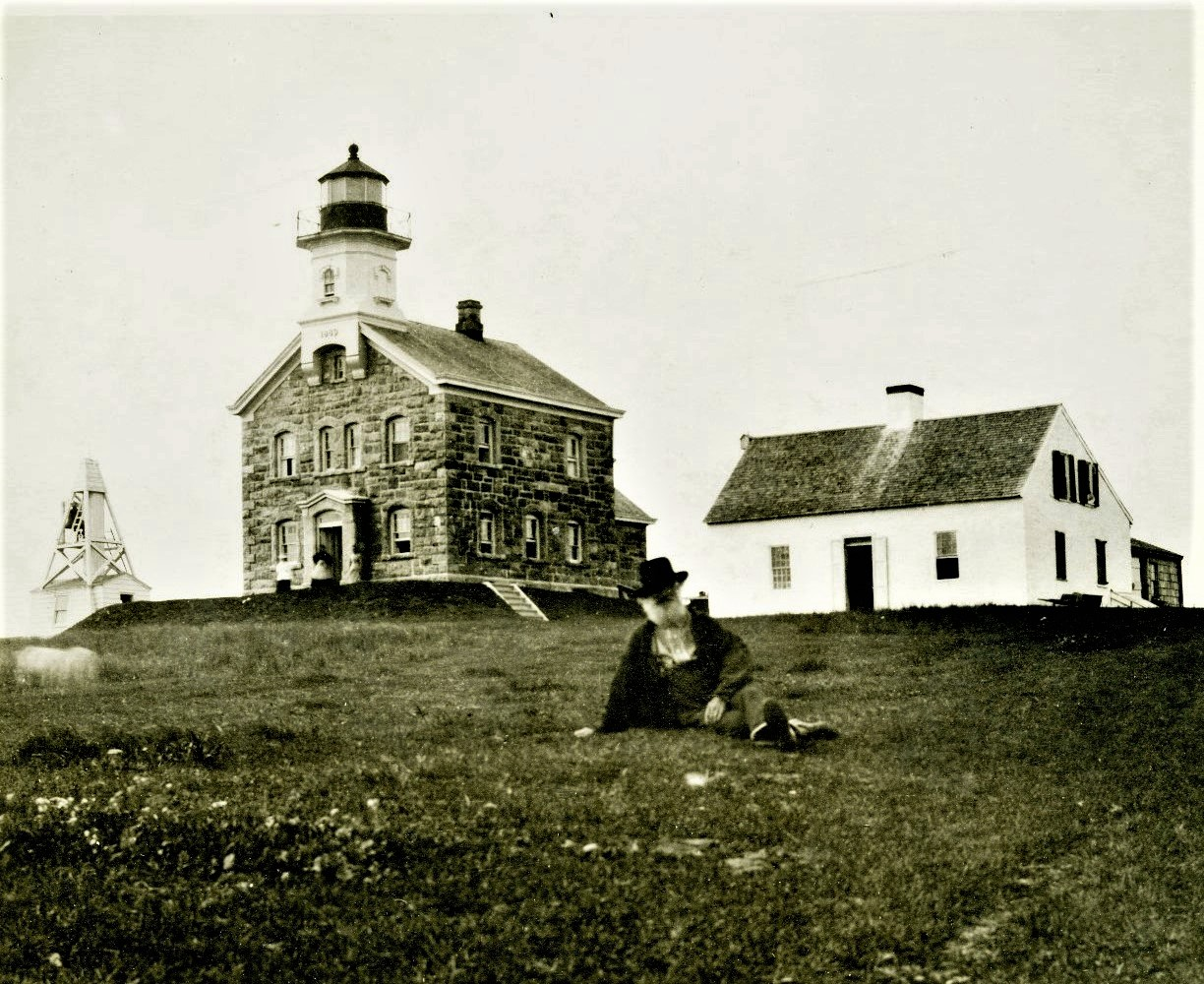
George Bradford Brainerd (American, 1845–1887). Lighthouse Keeper, Plum Island, Long Island, 1879. Collodion silver glass wet plate negative. Brooklyn Museum

Plum Island was called "Manittuwond" by the Native American Pequot Nation. It was probably first seen by Europeans in 1614 when Adriaen Block, a Dutchman employed by the Dutch West India Company, charted the area. The island was named from the beach plums that grow along the shores, and an old Dutch map made about 1640 shows the name "Pruym Eyelant" (Plum Island). In 1659, the island was purchased by Samuel Wyllys III (Samuel Willis III), son of the Governor of Connecticut, from Wyandanch, the ruling local Indian Chieftain of Long Island, for a coat, a barrel of biscuits and 100 fishhooks.

On August 11, 1775, American General David Wooster dispatched 120 soldiers to the island, then known as Plumb Island, who were immediately fired upon by the British. After firing a single return volley, the soldiers retreated back to Long Island. Although no casualties were reported, this brief skirmish is believed to have represented at least one American military "first": the first amphibious assault by an American army.

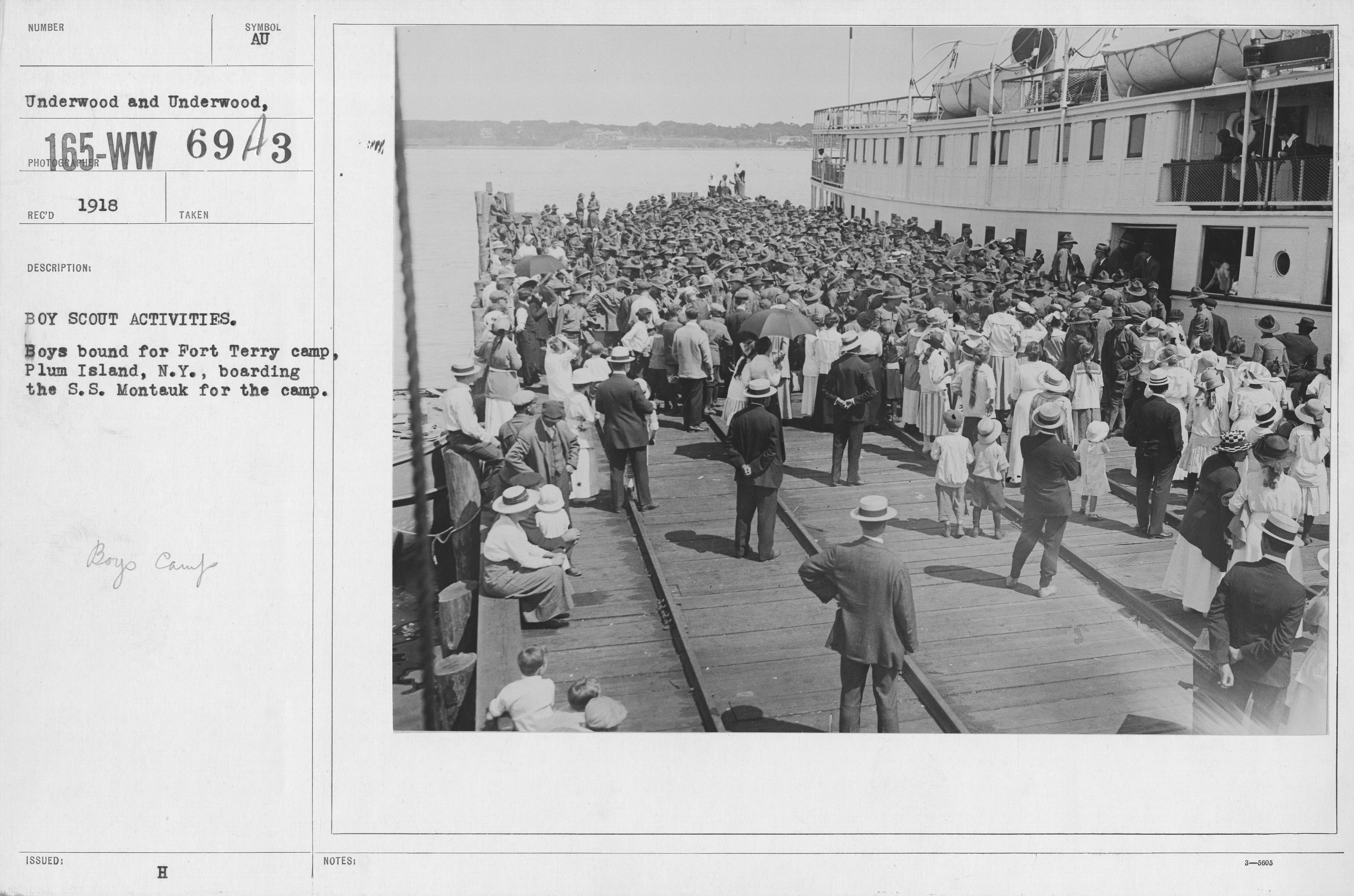
Boy Scouts boarding the S.S. Montauk for Fort Terry camp, Plum Island, N.Y.

The historic Plum Island Lighthouse is located at the west end of the island. The original lighthouse on Plum Island was constructed in 1827; the current structure was built in 1869. The light marks the east side of "Plum Gut", a mile-wide entrance to Long Island Sound with extremely strong tidal currents. The light aided navigation near the entrance to Long Island Sound, especially through the "Plum Gut" channel between Orient Point and Plum Island.

After passing through the possession of more than 20 families, in 1899, the island was purchased in its entirety by the United States government following the Spanish–American War for approximately $90,000. The U.S. Army established a Coast Artillery post, later known as Fort Terry, on the island in 1897. The fort was activated as an anti-submarine base during World War II. Deactivated after the war, the fort was subsequently reactivated and assigned to the Army Chemical Corps.

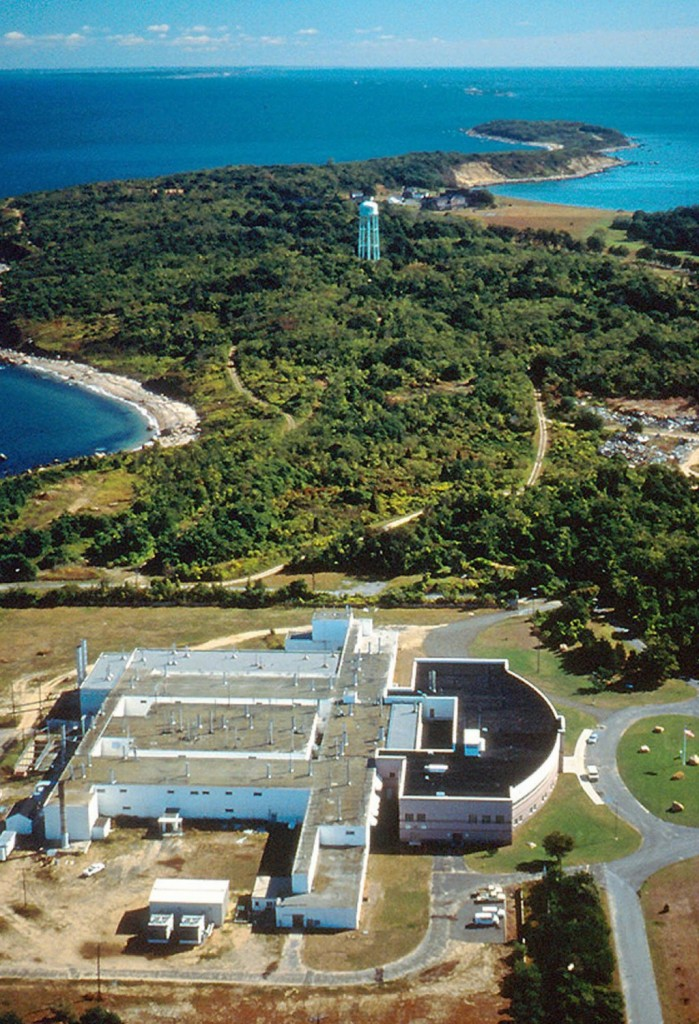
Aerial view of Plum Island Animal Disease Center

In 1954, the United States Department of Agriculture (USDA) established the Plum Island Animal Disease Center (PIADC). The center conducts research on animal pathogens to protect farmers, ranchers, and the national food supply. Because of the nature of the research, access to the island and the research facility is restricted.

In 2003, the United States Department of Homeland Security (DHS) assumed ownership of the island and all its facilities. The USDA continues its long running science mission at PIADC jointly with DHS, which is charged with the safe and secure operation of the facility.

As one result of the heightened national security initiatives following the 9/11 attacks, Plum Island was considered as a potential site for a new high-security animal diseases lab, National Bio and Agro-Defense Facility (NBAF). In September 2008, the U.S. Congress passed H.R. 2638 (Sec. 540 - New York) that directed the General Services Administration (GSA) to close the PIADC, sell the island to the public, and to use the proceeds towards the construction of the NBAF, if it were decided that NBAF would be built elsewhere. In January 2009, the United States Department of Homeland Security (DHS) selected the City of Manhattan, Kansas, as the site for the NBAF, and decided to relocate the PIADC there as well. However, the decline in real estate values stemming from the subprime mortgage crisis and late-2000s recession caused the sale of the island to be considered no longer viable. Because the proceeds from selling the island were needed to construct the new facility in Kansas, the project was effectively cancelled for the short term when the 2013 federal budget request contained no funding for the new facility. As part of the planned sale of Plum Island, the United States Government prepared an Environmental Impact Statement (EIS) for the island, one objective of which is to determine whether the impact of nearly sixty years of animal testing on the island constituted a threat to public health that could preclude the planned sale.

In 2008, the U.S. Congress passed, and U.S. President George W. Bush signed H.R. 2638, part of the Consolidated Security, Disaster Assistance, and Continuing Appropriations Act, 2009, which required that Plum Island and the Plum Island Animal Disease Center (PIADC) be sold to help fund the new National Bio and Agro-Defense Facility in Manhattan, Kansas. This legislation started the process that would have had all of Plum Island sold to a private party.

A regional environmental group, Save the Sound, led the legal aspects of the movement to preserve Plum Island including the repeal of H.R. 2638. In addition, a coalition of conservation, environmental, and civic, organizations formed the Preserve Plum Island Coalition (PPIC). The PPIC advocates a plan for its designation as a National Wildlife Refuge or other protected area. The proposal provides for guided public access to the historic district and a trail area while nature preserve areas at the south and east would be restricted to student and research access.

On July 16, 2013, former U.S. Congressman Tim Bishop (First Congressional District of New York) introduced a new bipartisan bill ('Save, Don't Sell Plum Island'). This goal of this bill was to preserve critical biodiversity, and prevent further development, on Plum Island, by eliminating H.R. 2638's provision that all of Plum Island be sold at public auction to fund a new NBAF in Manhattan, Kansas. Similar legislation was also introduced in the U.S. Senate at the same time as that in the U.S. House of Representatives.

On August 29, 2013, the USDA and DHS announced a final Record of Decision (ROD) which determined that the entirety of Plum Island was to be sold to the private sector to help offset the cost of constructing the replacement facility. On September 30, 2013, New York Governor Andrew M. Cuomo sent a letter to the United States Department of Homeland Security (DHS), and United States General Services Administration (GSA), calling for both agencies to submit to a consent order requiring them to present a comprehensive environmental cleanup plan for Plum Island, in Suffolk County, New York, and giving New York State final review of the Island's conditions before it would be put up for sale.

On January 5, 2015, the Connecticut Fund For the Environment (CFE) & Save The Sound jointly sent a letter to the U.S. Dept. of Homeland Security (DHS) and U.S. General Services Administration (GSA), indicating a 60-Day "Notice of Intent to Sue" these agencies. This letter outlined how the sale of Plum Island, under the terms of H.R. 2638, was in violation of the Endangered Species Act (ESA).

On April 1, 2015, New York and Connecticut Senators Senators Schumer, Gillibrand, Blumenthal and Murphy, sent a letter to the Appropriation Committee asking for the repeal of H.R. 2638. The senators explained that the original financial reasoning to sell Plum Island was no longer valid, and that it was in the best interest of the country to conserve Plum Island.

Congress voted on December 21, 2020, to block the planned sale and preserve the island. The policy was a provision of the Consolidated Appropriations Act, 2021, an omnibus spending and stimulus bill. Under the bill, the Department of Homeland Security must offer the island for transfer to other federal agencies such as the Fish and Wildlife Service. If no federal agency wants to take control, the department must offer the island to state and local government agencies. The legislation also would give Homeland Security $18.9 million to clean contamination on the island. The provision was based on legislation first introduced in 2015 by Representative Lee Zeldin, whose district includes Plum Island.

The overall bill had overwhelming support by both political parties. On December 27, 2020, President Donald Trump signed the legislation.

== Geology ==
The northern portion of Plum Island is a recessional moraine deposit, part of the Harbor Hill-Roanoke Point-Fishers Island-Charlestown Moraine, and thus is one of the Outer Lands. Boulders in the moraine can be seen in the eroding northern slope of the island.

== In popular culture ==
- The 1988 novel The Silence of the Lambs by author Thomas Harris mentions "Plum Island" as a potential supervised vacation site for Hannibal Lecter as a reward for helping to catch Jame Gumb. He derisively refers to it as "Anthrax Island." It is also used in this way in the movie adaptation of the novel.
- Plum Island is a 1997 novel by Long Island, New York author Nelson DeMille, who uses the Island as one of his settings in the book.
- The 2004 book Lab 257: The Disturbing Story of the Government's Secret Plum Island Germ Laboratory by Michael Carroll, examines the Plum Island Animal Disease Center (PIADC).
- Plum Island is the title and focus of one episode of the television series Conspiracy Theory with Jesse Ventura. The episode was originally broadcast on Oct. 15, 2010, in Season Two.
- Plum Island is referred to in Season 4, Episode 4, "Dawn of the Med", of the show Royal Pains.
- Plum Island is the location of a deadly government conspiracy in the 2014 novel The Montauk Monster by Hunter Shea.
- Plum Island is the location of the Advanced Neurotechnologies Laboratory (ANS) in the 2016 novel Game Changer by Douglas E. Richards.
- Plum Island is the location of the US government's main research facility trying to stop the Hemorrhage Virus in the post-apocalyptic Extinction Cycle series by Nicholas Sansbury Smith.
- "Plum Island" is a song by the band Waterparks featured on their album Double Dare.
- “Plum Island” is mentioned in season 3 of the Netflix series Hemlock Grove.
- Plum Island is the setting for portions of Season 1, episodes 12 and 13 of the ABC series Emergence.
- Plum Island is mentioned in the episode "The Siren", in season 3 of What We Do in the Shadows, described as a possible key to the origin of energy vampires to be investigated by Laszlo and Colin Robinson, before being thrown off course by a siren's song.
- Plum Island is used as a setting throughout the 11th season of American Horror Story.
- Plum Island and its building 257 are mentioned in the TV series World War Weird season 1 episode 4 as the location of biological weapons research and possible source of Lyme disease.
- Plum Island is the subject of a short song by Jesse Welles published on YouTube in February 2025.
- Plum Island is the setting for a 2023 board game, The Plum Island Horror, in which there is a biological disaster and the locals need to save themselves and end the Horror.

== See also ==
- Plum Island Animal Disease Center (PIADC) – Building 257
