= Fort Terry =

Fort in New York state

- Part of Harbor Defenses of Long Island Sound
- Plum Island, Southold, New York

Site information
- Type: Coastal Defense
- Open to the public: No

Location
- Location in New York
- Coordinates: 41°10′48″N 72°11′42″W

Site history
- Built: 1897-1906
- Built by: United States Army Corps of Engineers
- In use: 1898-1946 (as coastal fort); 1952-54 (as military research facility); 1954-?(as civilian research facility)
- Battles/wars: World War I World War II
- Fort Terry Historic District
- U.S. National Register of Historic Places
- Nearest city: Southold, New York, U.S.
- Area: 840 acres (340 ha)
- Built: 1897-1906
- NRHP reference No.: 100006315
- Designated {{{NRHP_TYPE}}}: March 29, 2021

Fort Terry was a coastal fortification on Plum Island, a small island just off Orient Point, New York, United States. This strategic position afforded it a commanding view over the Atlantic entrance to the commercially vital Long Island Sound. It was established in 1897 and used intermittently through the end of World War II. In 1952, it became a military animal and biological warfare (BW) research facility, moving to civilian control in 1954 as the Plum Island Animal Disease Center. Despite the new civilian control, the biological warfare mission continued until 1969, when the US officially ended offensive BW research. The island is now being considered for sale or conversion to a wildlife refuge. Fort Terry was listed on the National Register of Historic Places in 2021.

== History ==
=== Early history ===
First “owned” by the Corchaug and Montaukett Indian tribes the Plum Island was "sold" to Samuel Wyllys for a coat, a barrel of biscuits and 100 fishhooks. The original fort was constructed after the federal government acquired Plum Island from Abraham S. Hewitt, a former mayor of New London, Connecticut, for $25,000. It is not clear how Hewitt became owner of the property.

=== Endicott period (1895-1916) ===
Fort Terry, named for Major General Alfred Terry, began construction in 1897 under the Endicott Program as part of the Harbor Defenses of Long Island Sound, and was expanded several times from the time of the Spanish–American War through World War II. The initial federal purchase was for 150 acres; however, the rest of the island was turned over to the federal government in 1901.

In 1898, before any of Fort Terry's batteries were completed, the Spanish–American War broke out. It was feared the Spanish fleet would bombard the US east coast. A number of weapons were purchased from the UK and hastily mounted to give the nascent fort system some modern armament. By March 1898 a 4.7 inch/45 caliber gun was mounted at Battery Kelly under this program. It was later transferred to the Sandy Hook Proving Ground in New Jersey, possibly in 1903. A pair of emplacements for modern 8-inch M1888 guns on modified 1870s-era Rodman carriages were also built at nearby Fort Tyler, but these seem to have not been armed.

Between 1897 and 1906 the following batteries were constructed at Fort Terry:

Name	No. of guns	Gun type	Carriage type	Years active	Latitude	Longitude
Stoneman	8	12-inch coast defense mortar M1890	barbette M1896	1901–1943	41.18889	-72.16472
Steele	2	10-inch gun M1888	disappearing M1896	1900–1942	41.185	-72.18083
Bradford	2	6-inch gun M1897	disappearing M1898	1901–1944	41.18944	-72.16333
Floyd	2	6-inch gun M1903	disappearing M1903	1906–1917	41.16778	-72.19722
Dimick	2	6-inch gun M1903	disappearing M1903	1905–1917	41.18861	-72.16389
Kelly	2	5-inch gun M1900	pedestal M1903	1898–1917	41.18833	-72.16444
Hagner	2	3-inch gun M1903	pedestal M1903	1906–1932	41.17111	-72.20361
Eldridge	2	3-inch gun M1903	pedestal M1903	1906–1946	41.1688889	-72.1961111
Dalliba	2	3-inch gun M1903	pedestal M1903	1905–1946	41.18861	-72.16222
Greble	2	3-inch gun M1903	pedestal M1903	1905–1932	41.18917	-72.16556
Campbell	2	3-inch gun M1903	pedestal M1903	1905–1934	41.18972	-72.16167

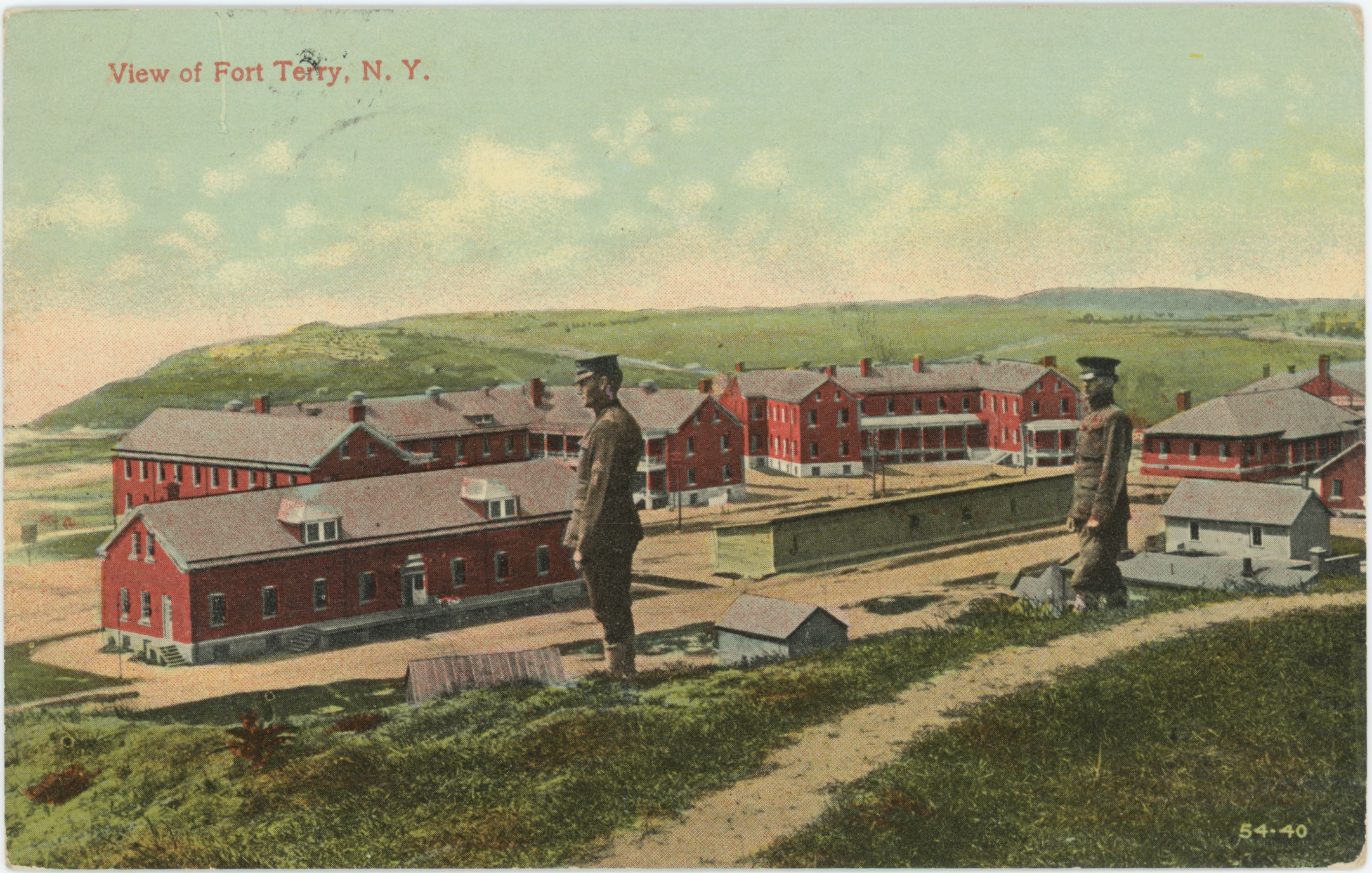
Vintage postcard pre-1915 showing view of Fort Terry, N.Y.

Battery Stoneman was named in honor of Brevet (Bvt.) Major General (MG) George Stoneman, who served with distinction during the U.S. Civil War, died 5 Sep 1894. Battery Steele was named in honor of Bvt. MG Frederick Steele, U.S. Army, who served with distinction during the Mexican–American War and the U.S. Civil War, and who died on 12 Jan 1868. Battery Bradford was named on March 13, 1902, in honor of Captain James Bradford, U.S. Artillery, who was killed on November 4, 1791, in action with hostile Indians at Fort Recovery, Ohio. Battery Floyd was named in honor of 2nd Lt. Robert Floyd, 3rd US Artillery, mortally wounded in the Battle of Chickamauga, GA, died on 23 Sep 1863. Battery Dimick was named in honor of Justin E. Dimick, an artillery officer mortally wounded in the Battle of Chancellorsville, VA, died on 5 May 1863. Battery Eldridge was named in honor of Capt. Bogardus Eldridge, U.S. Infantry, who was killed in action at Bocoor, Philippine Islands, 2 Oct 1899. Battery Dalliba was named in honor of Bvt. Major James Dalliba, assistant commissary of ordnance, who served 1811-1824 and died 8 Nov 1832. Battery Greble was named in honor of 1st Lt. John Greble, 2nd US Artillery, killed in action at the Battle of Big Bethel, 10 Jun 1861.

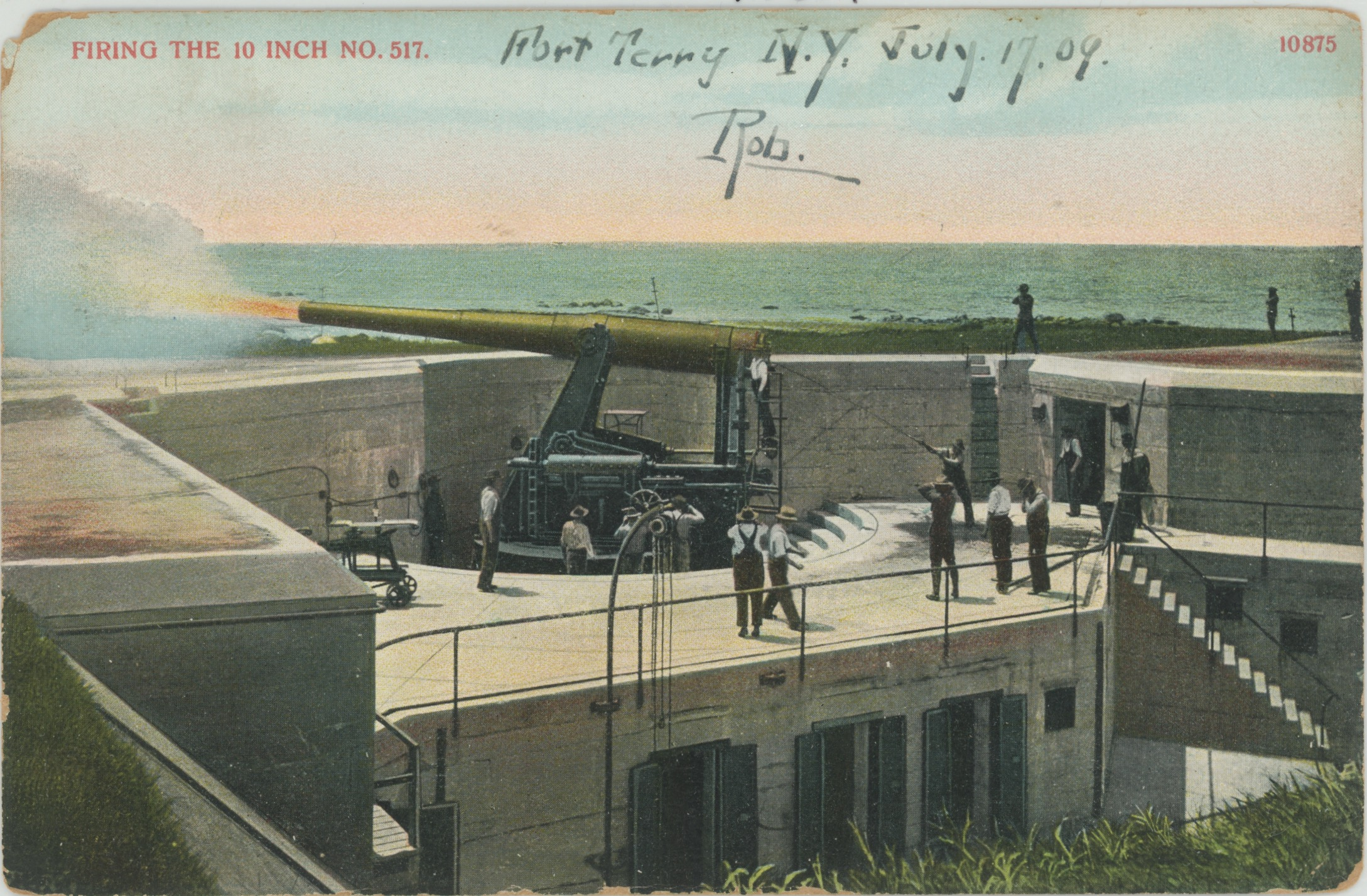
Vintage postcard sent in 1909 showing 10-inch cannon firing from ramparts at Fort Terry, N.Y.

Battery Steele was unusual in that the two 10-inch gun emplacements are on different levels on a hillside.

As an artillery post, Fort Terry was heavily armed as part of the Coast Defenses of Long Island Sound. The Army's forts of this type were garrisoned by the Coast Artillery Corps. By 1914 the fort had 11 gun batteries and facilities to control an underwater minefield. In addition the post was home to an advanced fire control system for both the guns and the minefield. The grounds also had a functional 36" gauge railroad built in 1914. The Porter locomotive was used to haul munitions from bunkers to the artillery batteries.

Fort Terry served as an artillery post during the Spanish–American War, and it was intended to attack enemy ships as they headed toward New York City. Organized in 1907, it was initially manned by the 133rd Company, Coast Artillery Corps, organized in 1907. In 1916, they were re-designated as the 3d Company, and continued to serve in that capacity throughout World War I. Lieutenant Colonel Andrew Hero, Jr was in command of the post in August, 1915.

=== World War I ===
Following the American entry into World War I in April 1917, changes were made at the stateside forts with a view to putting some coast artillery weapons into the fight on the Western Front. The Coast Artillery Corps manned almost all US heavy and railway artillery in that war, with stateside forts reduced to a minimum garrison to provide gun crews in France. The forts were also important as mobilization and training centers. The four 6-inch guns of Batteries Floyd and Dimick were dismounted in 1917, to be mounted on field carriages for service in France. The pair of 5-inch guns of Battery Kelly were apparently remounted at Fort H. G. Wright until scrapped in 1919. The 6-inch guns appear to have arrived in France, but for lack of training time none of the 5-inch or 6-inch batteries saw action in that war. The guns were never returned to Fort Terry. In 1918 four of Battery Stoneman's mortars were removed; this was to improve reloading time as reloading four mortars simultaneously in one pit was cumbersome. Many of the mortars removed under this program became railway artillery, but none of these were shipped to France during the war.

=== Between the wars ===
Following the end of World War I, Fort Terry was declared surplus and put under the control of personnel at Fort H.G. Wright in caretaker status. Two anti-aircraft batteries with two guns each were built in 1920, probably armed with the 3-inch gun M1917. In 1924, Fort Terry was used by the Portsmouth (NH) National Guard Armory (the 197th Coast Artillery Regiment (Antiaircraft)) as their summer encampment and training location. The gun and machine gun battalions worked on night firing solutions at aerial balloon targets, tracked by the searchlight battalion. In 1930 the federal census for New York identified 133 people living on Fort Terry. In 1930 the Justice Department conducted a study on building a 1000-cell prison on the island, but it was deemed impractical and was not built. In 1932–34, the 3-inch gun batteries Hagner, Greble, and Campbell were disarmed.

=== World War II ===
During World War II, the post was put to use as a training facility and supply depot. and as a look-out for German U-boats and planes. On 7 December 1941, the fort was listed as manned by the 242nd Coast Artillery Regiment (Harbor Defense) of the Connecticut Army National Guard. Today, on the east side of Plum Island, a network of trenches remains from the area's tenure as an artillery post. Fort Terry's guns were superseded by the pair of 16-inch batteries at Camp Hero in Montauk by 1944, so all except the four 3-inch guns of Batteries Eldridge and Dalliba were scrapped.

During World War II the following batteries were built at Fort Terry:

Name	No. of guns	Gun type	Carriage type	Years active
Battery 217	2	6-inch gun M1	shielded barbette M4	1944-Never armed
AMTB 911	4	90 mm gun	two fixed T3/M3, two towed	1943-1946
155mm	4	155 mm gun M1918	Panama mount	1942–1943, on Battery Steele

After World War II it was determined that gun coast defenses were obsolete. In 1948, the fort was once again declared surplus and disarmed with all guns scrapped.

=== Animal disease center ===
Beginning April 15, 1952, it served as a U.S. Army Chemical Corps facility. As such, it was under the control of the First Army. It was small and focused primarily on anti-animal biological warfare (BW) research aimed at enemy livestock. Anti-animal agents rinderpest and foot and mouth disease were the main areas of research. When the decision to use the Fort as a research facility was planned, it was envisioned that it would be staffed by less than 20 personnel.

Fort Terry's Chemical Corps installation covered three acres and included many of the amenities traditionally associated with U.S. military installations. Included on the grounds were various administration buildings, laboratories, a dock, a motor pool, a commissary, a hospital, a fire station, staff housing and animal housing.

When the Chemical Corps took control of Fort Terry, in 1952, it required the remodeling of 18 original buildings on post. The Army had been developing plans for the animal disease facility at Fort Terry since 1951. A laboratory was planned for the circa 1911 Building 257, originally known as Combined Torpedo Storehouse and Cable Tanks building. The lab was not completed by the time the Chemical Corps transferred the fort to the USDA but it and the rest of the remodeled buildings were eventually incorporated into the civilian facility.

In 1954, the U.S. Department of Agriculture (USDA) took over the island, and began to use it as the Plum Island Animal Disease Center. It was then staffed by at least 9 military and 8 civilian employees. Most of the disease research done by the USDA focused on biological warfare until Richard Nixon ended the U.S. bio-weapons program in 1969. Most of the original buildings and batteries still stand today and in many cases have been incorporated in one way or another into the island's new role as a disease research center.

=== 2000-2016 ===
As of August 2001, the fort and all of Plum Island was listed for sale with the Government Accounting Office under FORT TERRY POW SUB-STA number C02NY0619 as accepting bids, with $12,000 "cost up to date" for historical clean up. It is listed as "no further action", that is, no cleanup is needed under the FUDS cleanup program, no DOD-related hazards present.

In June 2003, the responsibility for Plum Island facilities was transferred from the USDA to the U.S. Department of Homeland Security.

A 2008 DHS report recommended that the remnants of Fort Terry, its buildings and batteries, be opened to the public and preserved. The Town of Southold, New York formed a Local Waterfront Revitalization Program (LWRP) which noted that many of the island's structures, including those at Fort Terry, could qualify for listing on the U.S. National Register of Historic Places.

On 16 May 2016, the House unanimously passed “Save, Don’t Sell Plum Island”, Bill H.R. 1887 reversing the 2008 decision to put the island up for sale which would have led to future development and, ultimately, the destruction of the island.

== Biological warfare research ==
The original anti-animal biological warfare research mission at Fort Terry was "to establish and pursue a program of research and development of certain anti-animal biological warfare agents". The first agent that was a candidate for development was foot and mouth disease (FMD). Besides FMD, five other top secret BW projects were commissioned on Plum Island. The other four programs researched included Rift Valley fever (RVF), rinderpest, African swine fever, and a slew of miscellaneous exotic animal diseases. Among the miscellaneous diseases were 11 other animal pathogens. Shortly before the handover of the facility to the Department of Agriculture in 1954, Fort Terry's mission was altered. The number of pathogens studied was reduced to two, rinderpest and FMD, and the mission was changed to "defensive" research of those two diseases.

== See also ==
- Building 101
- Building 257
- Fort Detrick
- Plum Island Animal Disease Center
- 11th Coast Artillery Regiment
- 242nd Coast Artillery Regiment
- Seacoast defense in the United States
- United States Army Coast Artillery Corps
