= National Bio and Agro-Defense Facility =

American BSL-4 research facility

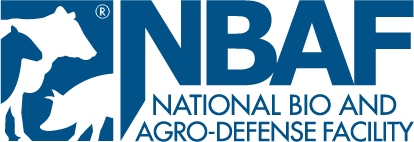
- NBAF logo

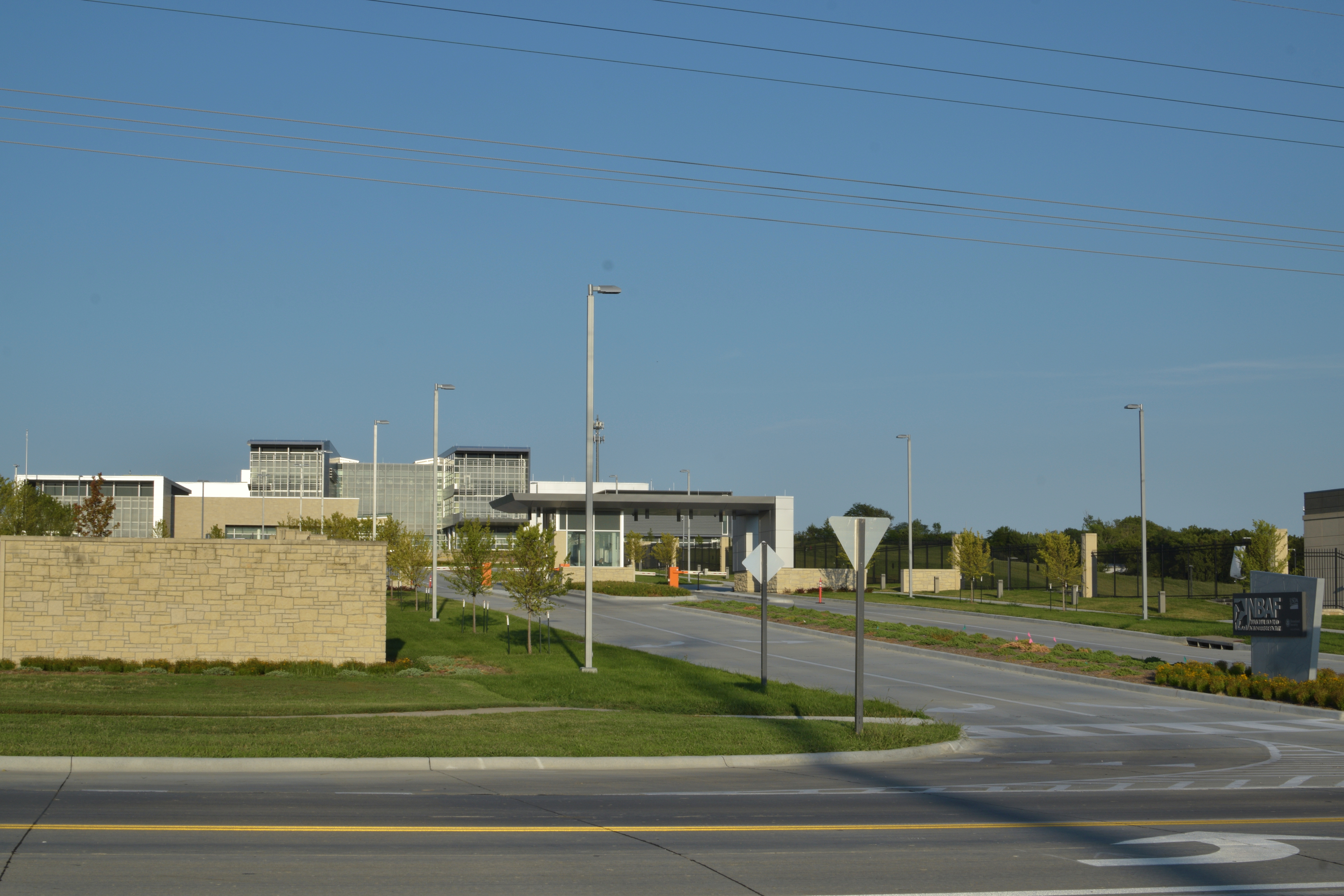
- Front of the NBAF
- Nickname: NBAF
- Established: 2015
- Laboratory type: Biosafety level 4 research laboratory
- Research type: Scientific research and biodefense
- Budget: US$1.25 billion (2021)
- Field of research: Human, zoonotic, and foreign animal diseases
- Director: Alfonso Clavijo
- Staff: 250–350
- Location: Manhattan, Kansas, 66506, U.S. 39°12′11″N 96°35′03″W
- Campus: 574,000 square feet (53,300 m^{2})
- Operating agency: United States Department of Agriculture
- Website: USDA website

Map
- Location within the State of Kansas

The National Bio and Agro-Defense Facility (NBAF) is a biosafety level 4 research laboratory in Manhattan, Kansas, operated by the United States Department of Agriculture. The facility opened in June 2023. The facility is designed to combat biological threats involving human, zoonotic, and foreign animal diseases. The NBAF replaced the aging Plum Island Animal Disease Center (PIADC) on Plum Island, New York. The primary research tenants of the facility are the Agriculture Research Service (USDA-ARS) and Animal Plant Health Inspection Service, Veterinary Services (USDA-APHIS-VS). Construction on the 574,000-square-foot (53,300 m^{2}) facility officially began in May 2015, and was scheduled to be completed by May 2021. The ongoing COVID-19 pandemic, however, has delayed scheduled commissioning to October 2021, followed by further delays to Spring, and finally summer 2023. Operations will be fully transferred from the Plum Island facility by 2023. The facility employs between 250 and 350 people. The facility is a constituent member of the Biosafety Level 4 Zoonotic Laboratory Network, and is currently led by Alfonso Clavijo.

== Background ==
The NBAF was initially proposed because the prior facility on Plum Island was considered inadequate by the Department of Homeland Security, citing its size, and lack of Biosafety Level 4 (BSL-4) capabilities.

The new facility will research and develop countermeasures to combat high-consequence biological threats involving human, zoonotic (i.e., transmitted from animals to humans), and foreign animal diseases. Included among the diseases to be studied at the research lab are foot-and-mouth disease, classical swine fever, African swine fever and contagious bovine pleuropneumonia. Approximately 10% of the facility will be used for BSL-4 level research.

=== Site selection ===
In January 2009, DHS chose to locate the NBAF in Manhattan, Kansas, after a multi-year process. Out of 29 original sites considered in 2006, the agency selected six finalists in July 2007:

- University of Georgia – Athens, Georgia
- Kansas State University – Manhattan, Kansas
- Flora Industrial Park – Madison County, Mississippi
- Plum Island Animal Disease Center – Plum Island, New York
- Umstead Research Farm – Butner, North Carolina
- Texas Research Park – San Antonio, Texas

Before the selection of the site, several rural advocacy groups, such as the National Grange, spoke out against the idea of locating the facility on the mainland. In addition, groups formed in Manhattan; Athens, Georgia; and Butner, North Carolina to oppose the laboratory's proposed location in those cities.

By memo dated December 4, 2008, the Department of Homeland Security named the Kansas site as the preferred location for the NBAF. On January 16, 2009, the record of decision was published in the Federal Register.

After the Manhattan location was finalized in 2009, the Government Accountability Office questioned the choice of location in a July 2010 draft report, because it is located on the mainland U.S. unlike the current Plum Island facility. This led to a further "site-specific" study of the facility's safety, issued by DHS in 2012.

==== Risk assessments ====
Plum Island is the only research facility currently studying foot-and-mouth disease (FMD) in the U.S. In 2008, the Government Accountability Office (GAO) was asked to evaluate the evidence DHS used to support its determinations that FMD work can be done safely on the U.S. mainland, whether an island location provides any additional protection over and above that provided by modern high containment laboratories on the mainland, and the economic consequences of an FMD outbreak on the U.S. mainland.

Because of concerns raised by the GAO in 2010, Congress instructed DHS to complete a "site-specific biosafety and biosecurity risk assessment." It also directed the National Academy of Sciences to appoint a committee of the National Research Council (NRC) to conduct an independent evaluation of this site-specific risk analysis to determine its adequacy and validity. Congress would not release construction funds until these were completed and evaluated.

DHS completed the requisite site-specific risk analysis (SSRA) in March 2012, and the NRC committee issued its evaluation of the SSRA in June 2012.

=== Site construction ===
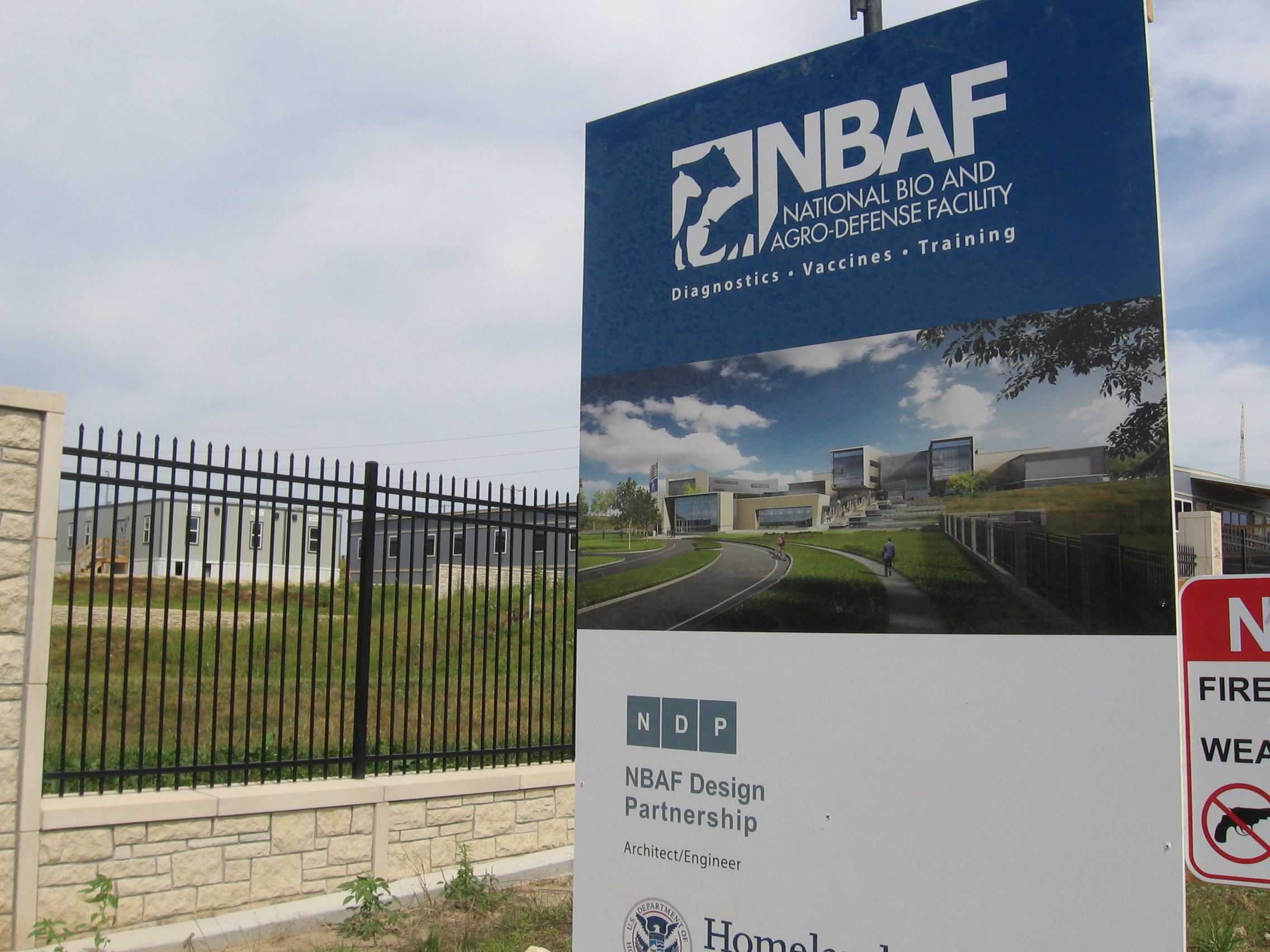
NBAF construction site in Manhattan in 2013

Preliminary clearing and grading of the proposed site began in 2010, construction on the site's power plant began in 2013, and construction of the lab began in 2015.

On January 2, 2013, the Department of Homeland Security accepted a transfer of land from the State of Kansas for the site of the facility. In March 2013, a contract was awarded for the construction of a central utility plant for the NBAF. An official groundbreaking ceremony for construction of the power plant was held on May 28, 2013.

The federal government budgeted $440 million for construction and related work on the NBAF under the Consolidated Appropriations Act of 2014, signed into law on January 17, 2014. President Barack Obama included an additional $300 million for construction in his proposed 2015 budget, constituting the final installment of federal construction spending for the facility. This funding was secured when President Obama signed into law the Department of Homeland Security Appropriations Act, 2015, on March 3, 2015.

A groundbreaking ceremony for construction on the full facility was held on May 27, 2015. It was attended by Kansas Senator Pat Roberts, Kansas Governor Sam Brownback, U.S. Secretary of Agriculture Tom Vilsack, and Homeland Security Secretary Jeh Johnson.

In 2019 the Department of Homeland Security shed its interest in the project, and agreed to transfer operating responsibility of the facility once completed to the Department of Agriculture. DHS remained in charge of the construction until it was completed.
