= Plum Island Animal Disease Center =

Defunct American research facility

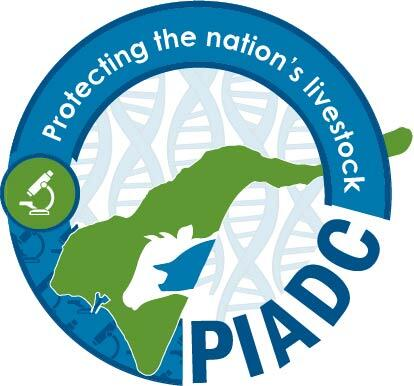
- PIADC logo

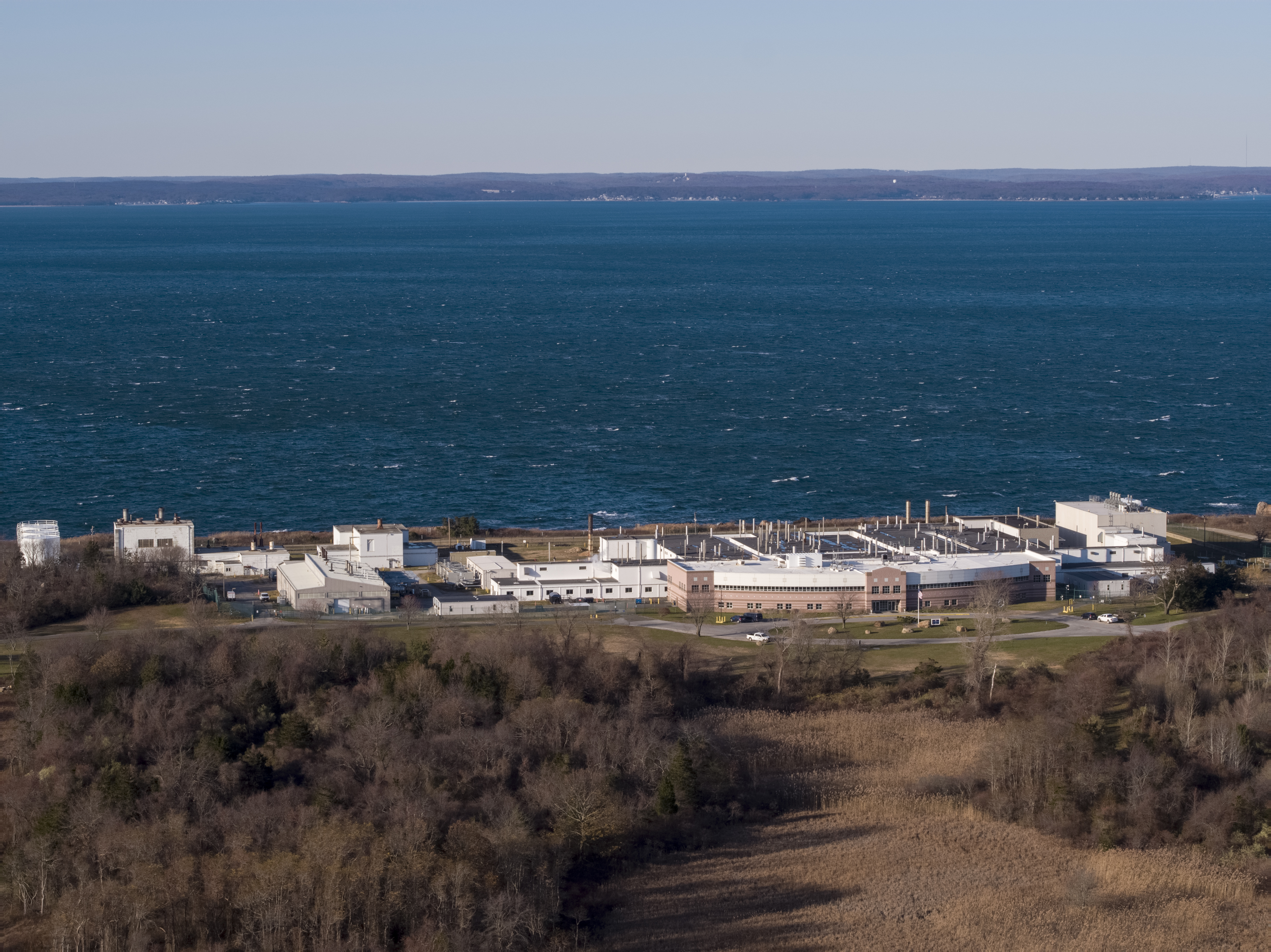
- Buildings 100 and 101 at PIADC in 2019.
- Established: 1954 – September 2025
- Budget: $16.5 million
- Field of research: Foreign animal diseases
- Location: Plum Island, New York, 11957, U.S. 41°10′44″N 72°12′20″W
- Operating agency: U.S. Department of Homeland Security
- Website: DHS site

Map
- Location within Long Island

Plum Island Animal Disease Center (PIADC) is a defunct United States research facility dedicated to the study of foreign animal diseases of livestock located off the eastern tip of Long Island, New York. Established in 1954 by the U.S. Department of Agriculture (USDA), the biosafety level 3 (BSL-3) laboratory specialized in the study of highly infectious foot-and-mouth disease (FMD) and African swine fever virus. The facility's research contributions included several vaccines and treatments for both diseases. Scientific research activity at the facility ended in September 2025, relocating to the USDA National Bio and Agro-Defense Facility in Manhattan, Kansas. The island is being remediated under the oversight of the Environmental Protection Agency; its future use remains contested.

Isolated on Plum Island off the eastern tip of Long Island, the center was established in 1954 to protect America's livestock from animal diseases. It was the only facility in the country authorized to work with live foot-and-mouth disease (FMD) samples. At the height of the Cold War, study of biological weapons for use against livestock was conducted at the site, ending in 1969 when Richard Nixon declared an end to the United States' offensive bioweapons program.

The facility's cost, high-risk select agent work, and proximity to the New York metropolitan area had long drawn controversy; in 2000, the facility was prevented from receiving BSL-4 accreditation following activist pressure and declining support for biodefense spending. Amid renewed interest following September 11 and the 2001 anthrax attacks, control of the lab was turned over to the new Department of Homeland Security (DHS)'s Directorate for Science and Technology (S&T), where it operated as a partnership with USDA. DHS had sought to close and replace the facility since at least 2005.

== Location ==
The center is located on Plum Island near the northeast coast of Long Island in New York state. During the Spanish–American War, the island was purchased by the government for the construction of Fort Terry, which was later deactivated after World War II and then reactivated in 1952 for the Army Chemical Corps. The center comprises 70 buildings (many of them dilapidated) on 840 acres (3.4 km^{2}). Plum Island has its own fire department, power plant, water treatment plant, and security. Any wild mammal seen on the island is killed to prevent the possible transmission of foot-and-mouth disease. However, as Plum Island was named an important bird area by the New York Audubon Society, it has attracted different birds. Plum Island has placed osprey nests and bluebird boxes throughout the island. As of 2008, new kestrel houses were planned to be added.

== History ==
In response to disease outbreaks in Mexico and Canada in 1954, the US Army gave the island to the Agriculture Department to establish a research center dedicated to studying foot-and-mouth disease in cattle.

The island was opened to news media for the first time in 1992. In 1995, the Department of Agriculture was issued a $111,000 fine for storing hazardous chemicals on the island.

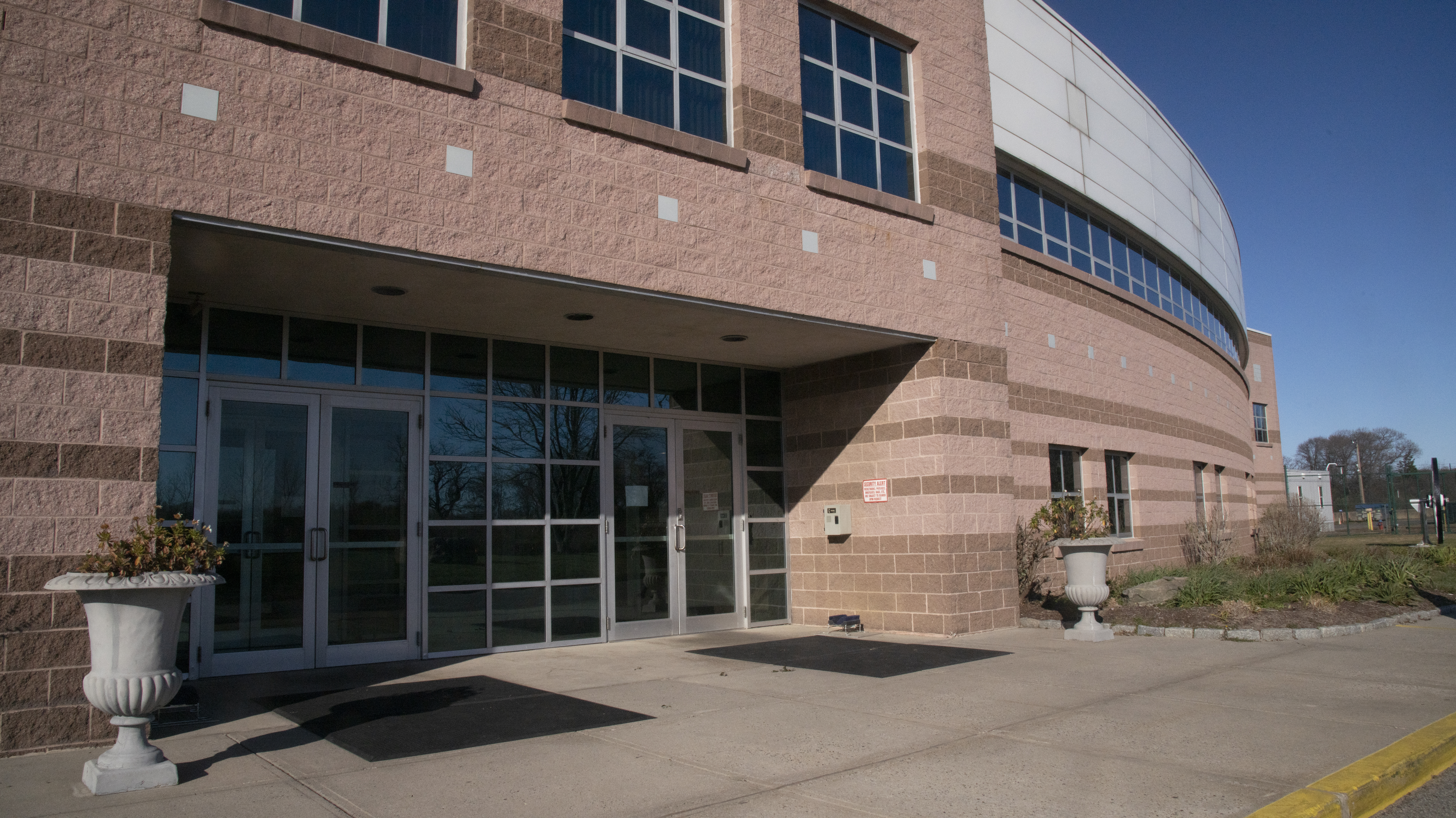
The entrance of PIADC buildings 100 and 101 in 2019.

Local Long Island activists prevented the center from expanding to include diseases that affect humans in 2000, which would have required a Biosafety Level 4 designation; in 2002, the US Congress again considered the plan.

The Wall Street Journal reported in January 2002 that many scientists and government officials wanted the lab to close, believing that the threat of foot-and-mouth disease was so remote that the center did not merit its $16.5 million annual budget. In 2002, the Plum Island Animal Disease Center was transferred from the United States Department of Agriculture to the United States Department of Homeland Security. In August 2002, unionized maintenance and operations employees at the center went on strike during a contract dispute with government contractor LB&B Associates. Local 30 shop steward David Naleski publicly raised concerns about the facility's operation during the dispute and the use of replacement workers.

In 2003, a whistleblower who raised safety concerns at the facility was fired by the contractor he worked for. He had discussed his concerns with aides to Senator Hillary Clinton. A National Labor Relations Board judge found that the contractor, North Fork Services, had discriminated against the whistleblower.

In 2020, the Department of Homeland Security planned to put the island up for auction after Congress blocked the conclusion of laboratory activities in 2023. As part of ongoing COVID-19 pandemic relief legislation, Senator Chuck Schumer of New York negotiated a provision in the CARES Act that protects the island from being sold. Environmentalists had opposed the sale of the island because of its extensive wildlife habitats. After the final draft of the legislation was announced, Schumer said, "It would have been a grave mistake to sell and develop Plum Island's 840 acres of habitat, which is home to many endangered species; that's why preventing the unnecessary sale requirement was a top priority of these negotiations."

== Activities ==
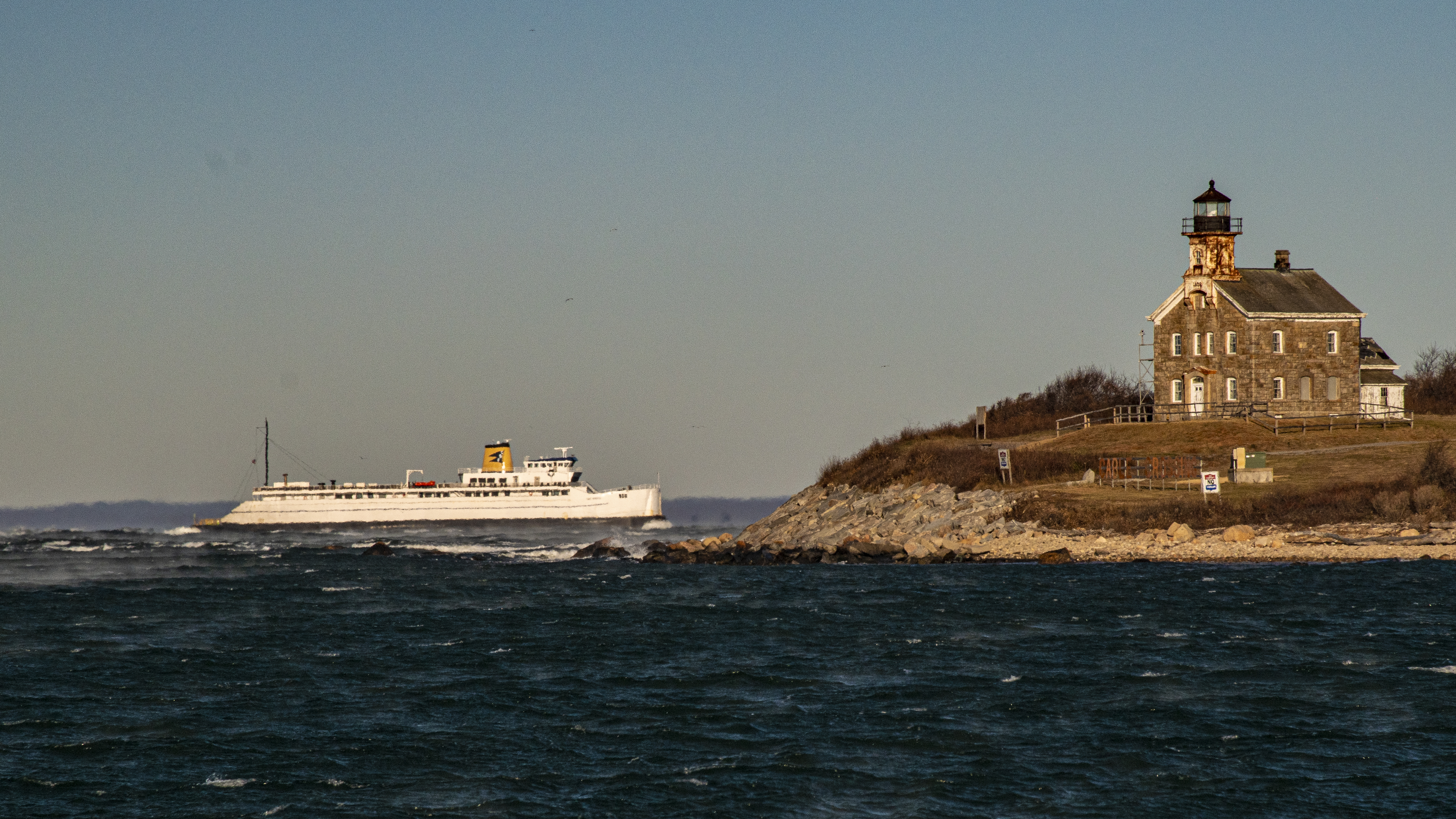
The facility’s ferry operates between Plum Island and Orient Point, New York.

PIADC's mission can be grouped into three main categories: diagnosis, research, and education.

Since 1971, PIADC has been educating veterinarians in foreign animal diseases. The center hosts several Foreign Animal Disease Diagnostic schools each year to train federal and state veterinarians and laboratory diagnostic staff, military veterinarians, and veterinary school faculty.

At PIADC, the U.S. Department of Homeland Security (DHS) and U.S. Department of Agriculture (USDA) work together; DHS's Targeted Advanced Development unit partners with USDA, academia, and industry scientists to deliver vaccines and antivirals to the USDA for licensure and inclusion in the USDA National Veterinary Vaccine Stockpile.

USDA Agricultural Research Service (ARS) conducts basic and applied research to develop countermeasures against foreign animal diseases, including strategies for prevention, control, and recovery. ARS focuses on developing faster-acting vaccines and antivirals for use during outbreaks to limit or stop transmission. Antivirals prevent infection while vaccine immunity develops. The principal diseases studied are foot-and-mouth disease, classical swine fever, and vesicular stomatitis virus.

USDA Animal and Plant Health Inspection Services (APHIS) operates the Foreign Animal Disease Diagnostic Laboratory, an internationally recognized facility performing diagnostic testing of samples collected from U.S. livestock. APHIS also tests animals and animal products being imported into the U.S. APHIS maintains the North American Foot-and-Mouth Disease Vaccine Bank at PIADC and hosts the Foreign Animal Disease Diagnosticians training program, offering several classes per year to train veterinarians to recognize foreign animal diseases.

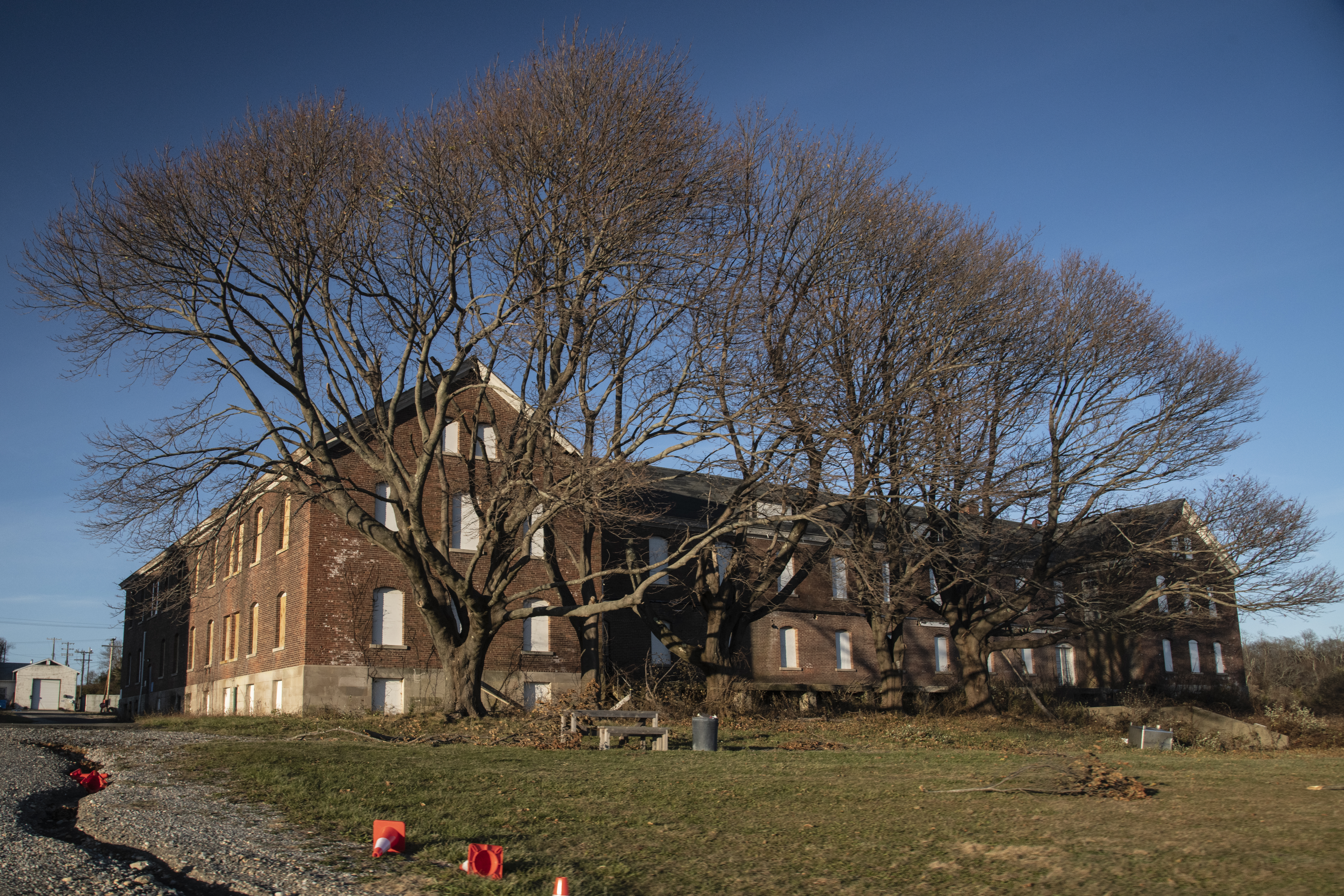
Shuttered former U.S. Army facilities were used to support the island's biological warfare program in the 1960s.

Research on biological weapons at PIADC ceased when the United States Biological Warfare program was ended in 1969 by President Richard Nixon.

=== Biological weapons research ===
The original anti-animal biological weapons mission was "to establish and pursue a program of research and development of certain anti-animal (BW) agents". By August 1954 animals occupied holding areas at Plum Island and research was ongoing within Building 257. The USDA facility, known as the Plum Island Animal Disease Center, continued work on biological warfare research until the U.S. program was ended by Richard Nixon in 1969. The bio-weapons research at Building 257 and Fort Terry was shrouded in an aura of mystery and secrecy. The existence of biological warfare experiments on Plum Island during the Cold War era was denied for decades by the U.S. government. In 1993, Newsday unearthed documents proving otherwise, and in 1994, Russian scientists inspected the Plum Island research facility to verify that these experiments had indeed ended.

== Diseases studied and outbreaks ==
As a diagnostic facility, PIADC scientists study more than 40 foreign animal diseases, including classical swine fever and African swine fever. PIADC runs about 30,000 diagnostic tests each year. PIADC operates Biosafety Level 3 Agriculture (BSL-3Ag), BSL-3 and BSL-2 laboratory facilities. The facility's research program includes the development of diagnostic tools and biologicals for foot-and-mouth disease and other livestock diseases.

Because federal law stipulates that live foot-and-mouth disease virus cannot be studied on the mainland, PIADC is unique in that it is currently the only laboratory in the U.S. equipped with research facilities that permit the study of foot-and-mouth disease.

Foot-and-mouth disease is extremely contagious among cloven-hooved animals, and people who have come in contact with it can carry it to animals. Accidental outbreaks of the virus have caused catastrophic livestock and economic losses in many countries throughout the world.

Foot-and-mouth disease was eradicated from the U.S. in 1929 (except for stocks at the Plum Island center) but is currently endemic in many parts of the world.

In 2012, two researchers at the facility, John Neilan and Michael Puckette, developed the first foot-and-mouth disease vaccine, which does not require live virus cultures in the manufacturing process, allowing vaccine development to occur safely and legally on the U.S. mainland for the first time.

=== Laboratory accidents ===
Plum Island has experienced outbreaks of its own, including one in 1978 in which foot-and-mouth disease was released to animals outside the center, and two incidents in 2004 in which the disease was released within the center.

In response to the two 2004 incidents, New York Senator Hillary Clinton and Congressman Tim Bishop wrote a letter to the Department of Homeland Security regarding their concerns about the center's safety: "We urge you to immediately investigate these alarming breaches at the highest levels, and to keep us apprised of all developments."

== Historic buildings ==
=== Building 257 ===
Building No. 257 at Fort Terry, on Plum Island near Long Island, New York, was completed around 1911. The original purpose of the building was to store weapons, such as mines, and the structure was designated the Combined Torpedo Storehouse and Cable Tanks building. Fort Terry went through a period of activations and deactivations through World War II until the U.S. Army Chemical Corps took over the facility in 1952 for use in anti-animal biological warfare (BW) research. The Chemical Corps planned a laboratory for the fort, to be housed in Building 257. The conversion of Fort Terry to a BW facility required the remodeling of Building 257 and other structures.

As work neared completion on the lab and other facilities in the spring of 1954 the mission of Fort Terry changed. Construction was completed on the facilities on May 26, 1954, but the post was transferred to the USDA before the military could utilize the new laboratory facilities. Fort Terry was officially transferred to the USDA on July 1, 1954, at the time scientists from the Bureau of Animal Industry were already working in Building 257. Construction on a new lab facility, known as Building 101, also began about this time but was not completed until September 1956.

A modernization program in 1977 aimed to update both Building 257 and Building 101, but it was canceled in 1979 due to construction contract irregularities. Plum Island facilities were essentially unchanged until a new modernization began in 1990. Two-thirds of the laboratory facilities inside Building 101 were renovated, and operations in Building 257 were consolidated into Building 101. According to a United States Department of Homeland Security spokesperson in 2004, Building 257 was closed in 1995 and poses no health hazard.

=== Building 101 ===
The structure is a 164,000-square-foot (15,200 m^{2}) T-shaped white building. It is situated on Plum Island's northwest plateau on a 10-acre (40,000 m^{2}) site where it is buttressed by a cliff which leads into the ocean. To the south-west of the building's site is the old Plum Island Lighthouse.

Construction on Plum Island's new laboratory Building 101 began around July 1, 1954, around the same time that the Army's anti-animal bio-warfare (BW) facilities at Fort Terry were transferred to the U.S. Department of Agriculture. Following the transfer, the facilities on Plum Island became known as the Plum Island Animal Disease Center. The USDA's $7.7. million Building 101 laboratory facility was dedicated on September 26, 1956. Before the building's opening, the area around it was sprayed with chemicals to deter insect or animal life from approaching the facility. Upon its opening, a variety of tests using pathogens and vectors were conducted on animals in the building. Research on biological weapons at PIADC did not cease until the entire program was canceled in 1969 by Richard Nixon.

A modernization program in 1977 aimed to update both Building 101 and another laboratory, Building 257, but it was canceled in 1979 due to construction contract irregularities. PIADC facilities were essentially unchanged until a new modernization began in 1990. Two-thirds of the laboratory facilities inside Building 101 were renovated and operations from Building 257 were consolidated into Building 101. Building 257 was closed, and a major expansion, known as Building 100, was completed on Building 101 in 1995. According to the Department of Homeland Security (DHS), Building 257 currently poses no health hazard.

== Controversy ==
=== Conspiracy theories ===
Prolific but unfounded conspiracy theories have alleged that Lyme disease, first documented in nearby Lyme, Connecticut, was a biological weapon that originated in the Plum Island laboratory. This is despite the fact that Lyme disease has been known to occur in human populations for thousands of years, with the earliest evidence even predating the Last Glacial Maximum. A 2004 book entitled Lab 257: The Disturbing Story of the Government's Secret Plum Island Germ Laboratory fueled the conspiracy theories. Archived specimens show that Lyme disease was endemic well before the establishment of Plum Island laboratory. Additionally, Lyme disease was never a topic of research at Plum Island, according to the US Department of Homeland Security and Department of Agriculture.

On July 12, 2008, a creature dubbed the Montauk Monster washed ashore at Ditch Plains Beach near the business district of Montauk, New York. The creature, a quadruped of indeterminate size, was dead when discovered, and was assumed by some to have come from Plum Island as a result of the currents and proximity to the mainland. Palaeozoologist Darren Naish studied the photograph and concluded from visible dentition and the front paws that the creature may have been a raccoon. This was also the opinion of Larry Penny, the East Hampton Natural Resources Director.

=== Terrorism ===
When American-educated Pakistani neuroscientist Aafia Siddiqui, a suspected al-Qaeda member, was captured in Afghanistan in July 2008, she had in her handbag handwritten notes referring to a "mass casualty attack" that listed various U.S. locations, including the Plum Island Animal Disease Center. In February 2010, she was convicted of assault with a deadly weapon and attempting to kill U.S. servicemembers and FBI agents who sought to interrogate her.

== Replacement facility ==
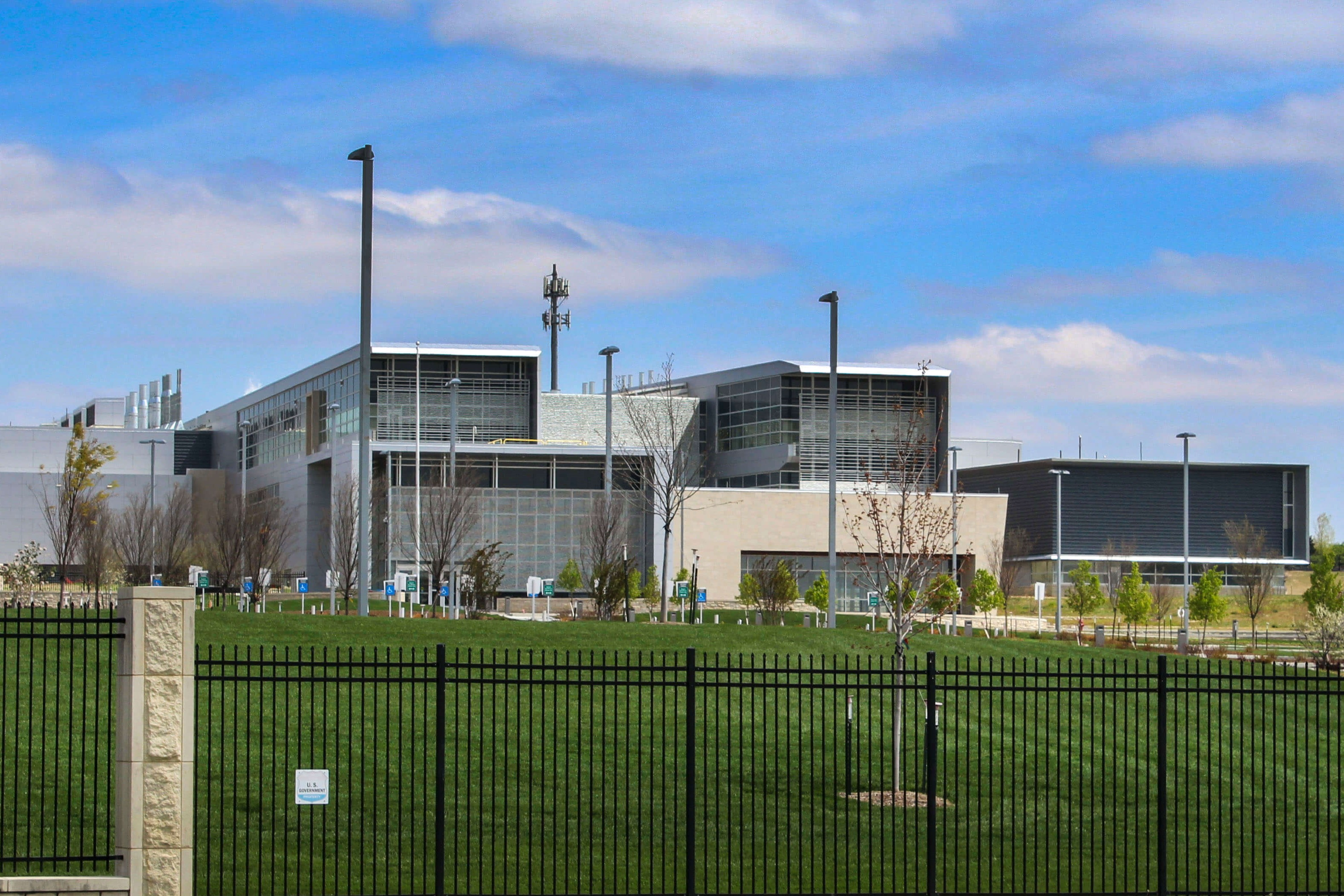
The NBAF on the campus of Kansas State University in Manhattan, Kansas (2020)

On September 11, 2005, DHS announced that a new federal facility would replace the Plum Island Animal Disease Research Center. The location of the new high-security animal disease lab, called the National Bio and Agro-Defense Facility (NBAF), is being built in Manhattan, Kansas.

The plan was controversial almost immediately upon its unveiling, following a cost assessment by DHS and prime contractor Booz Allen Hamilton, which found that the costs of maintaining or relocating the facility would be comparable.

Those conclusions, as well as claims about the safety of the facility proposed, were called into question several times, first by a 2007 Government Accountability Office study, which stated that claims by DHS that the work on foot and mouth disease performed on Plum Island can be performed "as safely on the mainland" is "not supported" by evidence.

In 2012, DHS completed a risk assessment of the Kansas site that called the proposed facility "safe and secure". In response, a 2012 review of the risk assessment by the National Research Council called it "seriously flawed".

Despite controversy, the new facility opened in May 2023. The USDA has named Alfonso Clavijo, former director of Canada's Centers for Animal Disease, as the director of the new facility.

== In popular culture ==
- Plum Island and PIADC are the subject of a murder mystery novel, Plum Island, by Nelson DeMille. DeMille has said, "How could anthrax not be studied there? Every animal has it." While addressing popular culture fears of a germ warfare lab at Plum Island, overall, the facility is presented as doing the job described by the Federal Government—research into animal diseases that would either devastate our national livestock or jump to humans and devastate us. The novel portrays the investigation into the murder of two Plum Island scientists. The motive, initially thought to be germs for terrorists or germs for a biotech company, is really the search for the lost treasure of Captain Kidd, who sailed the waters around Long Island before his capture. Kidd's treasure has never been found.
- Plum Island is also referred to in the 1991 psychological thriller The Silence of the Lambs, when the character of Hannibal Lecter is offered a transfer to a different psychiatric institution, as well as the promise of annual week-long supervised furlough to Plum Island, in exchange for his assistance in helping the FBI locate the whereabouts of the missing daughter of a prominent US Senator. It is later revealed in the film that the offer is bogus from the start, a ruse to elicit Lecter's cooperation.
- The Plum Island facility served as the inspiration for the Mount Dragon research facility in the 1996 techno-thriller Mount Dragon, written by Douglas Preston and Lincoln Child.
- The testing facility at Plum Island is the subject of a novel, The Poison Plum, by author Les Roberts.
- Plum Island and the facility there figure prominently in the 2014 horror novel, The Montauk Monster, by Hunter Shea, in which a bizarre carcass found on a beach in 2008 is an early version of vicious creatures now terrifying the Montauk community.
- The Plum Island facility is mentioned in the television show Emergence as the takeoff point for a flight that crashes in Southold, New York. In reality, this would be impossible, as there are no airstrips on Plum Island.
