= Montauk Monster =

Animal carcass found in Montauk, New York, in 2008

Coordinates: 41.039132°N 71.918714°W

This photograph of the creature's carcass appeared in July 2008, quickly circulating through local papers and the internet.

The "Montauk Monster" was an animal carcass that washed ashore on a beach in Montauk, New York, in July 2008. The identity of the creature and the veracity of stories surrounding it have been the subject of controversy and speculation. The corpse was eventually decided by experts to be that of a water-degraded raccoon.

Similar carcasses have washed up on American and Canadian shores and have been called omajinaakoos, or "the Ugly One", by Indigenous groups, who believe it to be an omen of bad luck.

== History ==
The story began on July 23, 2008, with an article in the local newspaper The Independent. Jenna Hewitt, 26, of Montauk, and three friends said that they found the creature on July 12 at the Ditch Plains beach, two miles east of the district. The beach is a popular surfing spot at Rheinstein Estate Park owned by the town of East Hampton. Jenna Hewitt was quoted:

We were looking for a place to sit and play ball games. Like they did in the summer of 93 when we saw some people looking at something ... We didn't know what it was ... We joked that maybe it was something from Plum Island.

Her color photograph of the creature ran in black and white under the headline "The Hound of Bonacville", a pun on the name Bonackers, which refers to the natives of East Hampton, and The Hound of the Baskervilles by Sir Arthur Conan Doyle. The light-hearted article speculated that the creature might be a turtle or some mutant experiment from the Plum Island Animal Disease Center. It then noted that Larry Penny, the East Hampton Natural Resources Director, had concluded that it was a raccoon with its upper jaw missing. There were rumors that the carcass had been taken away from the site. A local newspaper quoted an anonymous resident who claimed that the animal was only the size of a cat, and that it had decomposed to a skeleton by the time of the press coverage. She would not identify its location for inspection. Hewitt claimed that "a guy took it and put it in the woods in his backyard", but would not say who or where. Her father denied that his daughter was keeping the body's location a secret.

Hewitt and her friends were interviewed on Plum-TV, a local public-access television show. Alanna Navitski, an employee of Evolutionary Media Group in Los Angeles, California, passed a photo of the creature to Anna Holmes at Jezebel, claiming that a friend's sister saw the monster in Montauk. Holmes then passed it along to the website Gawker which gave it wide attention on July 29 under the headline "Dead Monster Washes Ashore in Montauk".

Photographs were widely circulated via email and weblogs, and the national media picked up on it raising speculation about the creature. The potential urban legend stature of the Montauk Monster was noted by Snopes.

The monster has been discussed on Conspiracy Theory with Jesse Ventura. On August 4, 2011, the Montauk Monster was featured on the second episode of the third season of Ancient Aliens, titled "Aliens and Monsters".

== Identifications ==
Initial media reports included speculation that the Montauk Monster might have been a turtle without its shell—although turtles' shells are fused with the spine and cannot be removed in this way—a dog, a large rodent, or a science experiment from the nearby government animal testing facility, the Plum Island Animal Disease Center.

William Wise, director of Stony Brook University's Living Marine Resources Institute, inspected the photo along with a colleague; they deemed the creature a fake, although Wise's "next-best guess" was that the creature could be a diseased dog or coyote which had "been in the sea for a while". Wise discounted the following general possibilities:

- Raccoon – the legs appear to be too long in proportion to the body.
- Sea turtle – sea turtles do not have fur or teeth.
- Rodent – rodents have two large, distinctive incisor teeth in front of their mouths.
- Dog or other canine such as a coyote – the corpse is doglike, but the eye ridge and feet do not match.
- Sheep or other ovine – although the face looks "somewhat ovine", sheep do not have sharp teeth.

Palaeozoologist Darren Naish studied the photograph and concluded from the corpse's visible dentition, skull shape, and front paws that the creature was a raccoon, with its extremely odd appearance merely a byproduct of decomposition and water action removing most of the animal's hair and some of its flesh. Naish disagreed with the idea that the legs were disproportionately long for a raccoon, providing an illustration of a raccoon's body superimposed over the corpse in the photograph. Jeff Corwin also identified the carcass as that of a raccoon in a Fox News interview.

== See also ==
- Globster
