= Foreign animal disease =

Animal disease or pest not in the United States

A foreign animal disease (FAD) is an animal disease or pest, whether terrestrial or aquatic, not known to exist in the United States or its territories. When these diseases can significantly affect human health or animal production and when there is significant economic cost for disease control and eradication efforts, they are considered a threat to the United States. Another term gaining preference to be used is transboundary animal disease (TAD), which is defined as those epidemic diseases which are highly contagious or transmissible and have the potential for very rapid spread, irrespective of national borders, causing serious socio-economic and possibly public health consequences. An emerging animal disease "may be defined as any terrestrial animal, aquatic animal, or zoonotic disease not yet known or characterized, or any known or characterized terrestrial animal or aquatic animal disease in the United States or its territories that changes or mutates in pathogenicity, communicability, or zoonotic potential to become a threat to terrestrial animals, aquatic animals, or humans."

A foreign animal disease in the United States has the potential to threaten food security, cause production losses for livestock producers while significantly increasing livestock production costs through costly disease control measures, affect the income of livestock producers, disrupt movement of livestock and livestock products, cause animal welfare problems in affected animals, possibly cause public health issues, and cause environmental consequences with the wildlife populations.

== Protecting US from FAD ==
=== Agencies involved in response to outbreak ===
World Organization for Animal Health (historical acronym OIE- the Office International des Epizooties) The OIE originated in 1924 with the ratification of an international agreement of 28 States on January 25, 1924. The membership currently shown (2017) is 181 members countries. This is the intergovernmental organization responsible for improving animal health worldwide, and is recognized as a reference organization by the World Trade Organization (WTO). The headquarters for the OIE are located in Paris. The objectives of the OIE are to "ensure transparency in the global animal disease situation", to "collect, analyse and disseminate veterinary scientific information", to "encourage international solidarity in the control of animal diseases", to "safeguard world trade by publishing health standards for international trade in animals and animal products", to improve the legal framework and resources of national Veterinary Services", and "to provide a better guarantee of food of animal origin and to promote animal welfare through a science-based approach".

The Food and Agriculture Organization (FAO) The FAO is an intergovernmental organization of 194 Member Nations, two associate members and one member organization, the European Union, and headquartered in Rome, Italy. The FAO was initially established as a specialized United Nations agency in 1945 at the first session of FAO conference in Quebec City, Canada. The main effort of the FAO is to achieve food security for all, and their stated three main goals are: "the eradication of hunger, food insecurity and malnutrition; the elimination of poverty and the driving forward of economic and social progress for all; and, the sustainable management and utilization of natural resources, including land, water, air, climate and genetic resources for the benefit of present and future generations." The FAO creates and shares critical information about food, agriculture and natural resources by identifying and working with different partners with established expertise and facilitating connections. The FAO has a role in animal health. High-impact animal diseases such as foot-and-mouth disease or African swine fevers may not directly affect human health, but they do affect food and nutrition security and livestock production and trade. A recent successful example has been the global eradication of rinderpest in 2011. The FAO has animal health programs to establish best practices to prevent and control priority diseases which threaten animal production, public health and trade through its international and regional networks, animal health projects and disseminating practical information. These programs include:

The FAO Emergency Prevention System (EMPRES) Animal Health develops strategies for intervention and improved management. It works to monitor and give early warning and ultimately to prevent animal diseases. The EMPRES works to prevent and control diseases at their source.

The Emergency Centre for Transboundary Animal Diseases (ECTAD) is FAO's corporate center for the planning and delivery of veterinary assistance to FAO member countries responding to the threat of transboundary animal health crises.

The FAO Food Chain Crisis Management Framework, grouping the three thematic EMPRES, provides an effective, multidisciplinary and coherent approach to threats affecting the food chain by integrating prevention, early warning, preparedness and response.

The Crisis Management Centre-Animal Health (CMC-AH) is FAO's rapid response unit to animal disease emergencies. The CMC-AH is a joint division of FAO's Animal Production and Health and Emergency and Rehabilitation Divisions, and established in partnership with the World Organization for Animal Health (OIE). The CMC-AH sends rapid response missions to countries to help assess epidemiological situations, diagnose outbreaks of animal diseases, and set up immediate measure to prevent or stop disease spread.

USDA/APHIS The Animal and Plant Health Inspection Service (APHIS) is part of the U.S. Department of Agriculture (USDA), and is the lead agency in an animal disease outbreak. APHIS is divided into 6 operational program units, 3 management support units, and 2 offices supporting federal government-wide initiatives. One of the APHIS operational program units is Veterinary Services.

Veterinary Services (VS) The VS protects and improves the health, quality, and marketability of the animals, animal products, and veterinary biologics of the United States by preventing, controlling, and/or eliminating animal diseases, and monitoring, and promoting animal health and productivity. The VS has primary responsibility in a disease outbreak involving domestic livestock and/or poultry. The VS is divided into three operational units:

The Surveillance, Preparedness and Response Services (SPRS) unit manages disease outbreaks (animal health incident management), surveillance programs, animal disease traceability programs, epidemiological investigations, commodity business planning, and One Health programs. The SPRS also manages the Logistics Center, which includes the National Veterinary Stockpile. Also part of the SPRS is the National Preparedness and Incident Coordination Center (NPIC), which has the responsibility for animal disease traceability, The National Animal Health Emergency Response Corps, the National Veterinary Accreditation Program, and Preparedness and Incident Coordination. The activities of the NPIC include developing and distributing emergency response guidelines based on the National Incident Management System and National Response Framework, developing foreign animal disease preparedness and response plans (FAD PReP), coordinating investigations and disseminating information about foreign animal disease investigations and events, supporting the Secure Food Supply Plans, and managing at the Emergency Management Response System (a web-based information management system that stores data on FAD investigations, animal health incidents, epidemiological tracing, disease surveillance, and intrastate and interstate animal movement.)

The National Import Export Services (NIES) unit manages import and export activities, from setting policy to inspection at ports of entry. NIES manages Animal Import Centers and Port Services, the Agricultural Select Agent Program, and the International Animal Health Standards Services, and operates six service centers, several animal quarantine facilities, and multiple ports of entry.

The Science, Technology and Analysis Services (STAS) includes the Center for Veterinary Biologics, the National Veterinary Services Laboratories, and the Center for Epidemiology and Animal Health. The STAS provides analysis of response options; animal disease modeling; animal health data acquisition, analysis, and interpretation; animal health surveillance design; diagnostic capability and capacity; economic analysis; national animal health laboratory network coordination; national studies and large scale epidemiological investigations; OIE Collaborating Center; predictive modeling; risk assessments; veterinary biologics approval and monitoring regulatory activities.

Department of Homeland Security (DHS) The Department of Homeland Security oversees the Office of National Labs (ONL) which includes Plum Island Animal Disease Center (PIADC), National Bio and Agro-Defense Facility (NBAF), National Biodefense Analysis and Countermeasures Center (NBACC), and the Chemical Security Analysis Center (CSAC). The DHS veterinary mission complements the mission of veterinarians in other Federal agencies. The Office of Health Affairs (OHA) is the Department of Homeland Security's principal authority for all medical and health issues. The Food, Agriculture, and Veterinary Defense (FAVD) Division within the OHA is the responsible authority for veterinary, food, and agriculture defense. The FAVD programs help government decision-makers protect the health and security of the nation by protecting its animals, plants, and food systems. The OHA and FAVD work with all levels of government and the private sector and in coordination with other DHS components works to help to prevent catastrophic incidents, but if such incidents occur then the OHA assists in coordinating the response and recovery. The DHS provides logistics, operations, and administrative support to assist in response efforts, and coordinate united national responses. All OHA veterinarians work in the Weapons of Mass Destruction – Biodefense (WMD-Bio) Office, which focuses on food and agricultural defense and protection. The Animal Production branch within WMD supports the National Veterinary Stockpile, which is managed by USDA, through its development of end to end planning from risk assessment to countermeasure deployment in order to contain catastrophic animal disease outbreaks. The DHS also supports the efforts of the National Animal Health Laboratory Network (NAHLN) which is managed by the USDA and forms part of a nationwide strategy to coordinate the work of all organizations providing animal disease surveillance and testing services. The DHS supports this effort through the DHS management of the Integrated Consortium of Laboratory Networks (ICLN) of which the NAHLN is a member. The purpose of the ICLN is to integrate and coordinate response to and consequences from acts of terrorism and other major incidents requiring laboratory surge capabilities, and to strengthen early detection and management of veterinary catastrophic incidents. Many other DHS agencies also support efforts to protect the food, agriculture, and veterinary resources of the U.S. The Plum Island Animal Disease Center (PIADC) has an interagency mission to protect U.S. agriculture from the threat of high consequence foreign animal diseases. DHS is responsible for operational management of PIADC. Since 1954, the PIADC has served as a front line defense against diseases that could devastate U.S. markets for livestock, meat, milk, and other animal products. PIADC is the only laboratory in the nation that can conduct initial diagnostic testing for foot-and-mouth disease (FMD). The DHS's Science and Technology Directorate takes vaccines developed by ARS, academia, and industry through the regulatory process to develop and license new vaccines and diagnostics for high-threat FADs. Coordinated programs between the Department of Homeland Security's Science and Technology Directorate (DHS) and the Department of Agriculture's Agricultural Research Service (ARS) and the Animal and Plant Health Inspection Service (APHIS) to provide a comprehensive approach for the defense of U.S. agriculture and defense against threats to the nation's health and economy. The Health Threats Resilience Division in the Office of Health Affairs of the DHS manages programs to help DHS and the U.S. to prepare for and respond to chemical and biological threats, as well as other health threats and hazards. Major programs and initiatives include: the National Biosurveillance Integration Center (NBIC), which integrates, analyzes, and distributes key information about health and disease events to ensure well-informed responses to save lives and minimize economic impact to threats and hazards; and state and local initiatives to help bring health care partners into the homeland security conversation to help communities prepare, plan, and respond to the evolving threat landscape.

U.S. Department of Health & Human Services (HHS)

U.S. Department of the Interior

U.S. Environmental Protection Agency (EPA)

U.S. Department of Labor/Occupational Safety and Health Administration

U.S. Department of Justice (DOJ)

U.S. Department of Defense (DoD)

U.S. Department of State

== Diseases considered FAD in the United States ==
=== African Swine Fever ===
African swine fever (ASF) is a highly contagious viral disease of pigs, endemic in sub-Saharan Africa, with no vaccine or treatment available. The ASF virus has spread through Georgia (2007) into Russia, then Ukraine, Belarus, and other Eastern European countries, and as of 2015 reports of outbreaks continue, mainly in wild boar. Mortality can be near-100 percent in some viral strains causing serious viral hemorrhagic disease while others can have more subtle clinical signs and be difficult to identify. "With high virulent forms of the virus, ASF is characterized by high fever, loss of appetite, hemorrhages in the skin and internal organs, and death in 2-10 days on average. Mortality rates may be as high as 100%." The ASF virus can be transmitted directly between animals, indirectly via fomites, or by tick vectors. Wild suids such as Warthogs are important to maintaining the virus present (by a natural cycle of transmission between warthogs and the soft tick vector O moubata in Africa, but the ASF virus can infect domestic pigs, feral swine, and some members of the wild pig family. The bite of an infected soft tick or ingestion of warthog tissues can spread the virus from the wildlife reservoirs to domestic pigs, then spread can be continued to pig to pig by blood, the oronasal route by direct contact with infected pigs, or by ingestion of waste food containing unprocessed pig meat or pig meat products. Other potential routes for spread can be from feeding food waste collected from international airplanes or ships from countries where ASF is found, feral swine movements, the movement of trucks between infected and disease-free areas, and illegal movement of infected pigs or pork products, whether unintentional (e.g., by tourists) or intentional (e.g., meat smuggling). The risk that the ASF virus can be introduced into the US and North America has increased because of changes in production practices, increasing globalization, and outbreaks of ASF in Europe. If the virus were to enter the US, control measures must be initiated to prevent the spread of the virus and eliminate it as quickly as possible, of which the primary control and eradication strategy will be depopulation of infected and exposed susceptible animals.

=== Classical swine fever (hog cholera) ===
Classical swine fever (CSF), also known as hog cholera, is a highly contagious and economically significant viral disease specific to swine. The clinical signs of CSF vary from the acute form with generalized disease including high fevers, convulsions, lack of appetite, and high mortality; to the chronic form with similar signs but not as severe as the acute; and to the mild or clinically inapparent form which seldom results in noticeable clinical signs although there may be small litter sizes, stillbirths, and other reproductive failures in addition to high mortality during weaning. Lesions of classical swine fever are clinico-pathologically indistinguishable from African swine fever; it is essential to send samples for laboratory confirmation on suspected cases. Transmission of the virus is mainly thought to be by the oral or oronasal routes, although can also occur by other mucous membranes and skin abrasions. The CSF virus can persist in blood and tissues after death, and can be readily spread by feeding uncooked swill that contains tissue from infected pigs. There is no treatment for CSF; affected pigs must be slaughtered and carcasses buried or incinerated. Classical swine fever was once widespread, but has been eradicated from many countries from domestic swine, including the US. A national eradication program was started in the US in 1962 and resulted in eradication in the US by 1976. Reintroduction of CSF into the US would be devastating.

=== Contagious bovine pleuropneumonia ===
Contagious bovine pleuropneumonia (CBPP) is one of the most important infectious diseases of cattle in Africa. CBPP is caused by Mycoplasma mycoides mycoides small colony, and is highly contagious with losses up to 80% in naive herds possible, although mortality rates greater than 50% are uncommon. Cattle (both Bos taurus and Bos indicus) are the primary hosts, but infections have also been reported in Asian buffalo (Bubalus bubalis), captive bison (Bison bison), and yak (Poephagus grunnien). Sheep and goats can also be naturally infected, but without a clear associated pathology, and are not thought to be important in the epidemiology of CBPP. CBPP in cattle attacks the lungs and pleura, and causes anorexia, fever, and respiratory distress, and can occasionally affect the joints. M. mycoides SC is transmitted animal to animal mainly in respiratory aerosols and inhaling droplets disseminated by coughing, The US eliminated CBPP in 1892 by an intensive quarantine and slaughter program, and was eradicated from most continents, including North America, by the mid-1900s. However, CBPP remains a serious concern in Africa, significantly affecting farmers and the economy, where the annual impact of CPBB is in the millions of dollars. CBPP would most likely be introduced into a CBPP-free country by an infected animal or embryo, as the organism does not survive for long periods on fomites. For prevention, imported animals can be quarantined and serologically tested. In an outbreak situation, CBPP is eradicated with quarantines, movement controls, slaughter of infected and in-contact animals, and cleaning and disinfection.

=== Contagious equine metritis ===
Contagious equine metritis (CEM) is a venereal disease of horses caused by the bacterium Taylorella equigenitalis. CEM is highly contagious, and is transmitted primarily during natural breeding. Transmission can also occur from infected fomites such as contaminated instruments and equipment, and via artificial insemination. Infected stallions show no signs, and almost every mare mated with an infected stallion will become infected. CEM does not cause systemic signs, but affects the reproductive tract, and can cause variable endometritis, cervicitis, vaginitis, and temporary infertility; only rarely causing permanent infertility or inducing abortion. Infected mares can present as an acute form with a copious vaginal discharge 10–14 days after breeding, a chronic form which has a milder uterine inflammation and less obvious discharge, or as a carrier with no obvious symptoms but still infectious to other stallions or mares. CEM occurs rarely in the United States but if the disease were to become widespread in the U.S., it could cause considerable economic loss in the horse industry. Testing for CEM can be done by bacterial culture (looking for the bacteria which causes CEM), blood testing (looking for an immune response to CEM), and test breeding. Test breeding is the breeding of a stallion to two known CEM-free mares, which are then each tested for CEM. Mares and stallions can be successfully treated, and control of CEM relies on identifying those infected and successfully treating them or eliminating them from breeding programs. The occurrence of CEM in the United States is a serious concern, and the USDA requires stallions coming into the United States be tested by both bacterial culture and test breeding.

=== Dourine ===
Dourine or Covering sickness is a serious protozoal venereal disease of equids, mainly horses, donkeys, and mules, caused by the protozoan parasite Trypanosoma equiperdum (subgenus Trypanozoon, Salivarian section). Dourine has been eradicated from many countries but is still present in horses in Asia, Africa, South America, Southern and Eastern Europe, Mexico, and Russia. Transmission of dourine is almost exclusively during breeding, more commonly from stallions to mares, but can also occur from mares to stallions. Clinical signs are characterized mainly by swelling of the genitalia, cutaneous plaques, and neurological signs often ending in death, with the severity varying depending on the virulence of the strain, the nutritional status of the horse, and stress factors. The mortality rate is believed to be higher than 50%, and some feel that nearly all cases are eventually fatal. The wide use of artificial fertilization technology has resulted in few cases being reported. Dourine can be an economically important disease, and is a well documented trade barrier for the movement of horses. Diagnosis of dourine is based on clinical evidence but requires confirmation by parasitological, serological, and molecular techniques. There is no vaccine available for this disease, and pharmaceutical therapy is not recommended because animals may improve clinically but will remain carriers. Good hygiene at assisted matings must be utilized. Compulsory notification and slaughter of infected horses is used to help control the disease, and most countries legislate control of movement.

=== Foot-and-mouth disease ===
Foot-and-mouth disease (FMD) is a severe highly contagious viral disease affecting cloven-hooved animals, such as cattle, sheep, and swine. FMD was once worldwide but has been largely controlled in developed nations, and has been eradicated from some regions such as North America and western Europe. The disease was eradicated from the United States in 1929. FMD is endemic in parts of Asia, and most of Africa and the Middle East, but FMD can occur sporadically in typically free areas. The organism causing FMS is an aphthovirus in the family Picornaviridae. There are seven major viral serotypes containing collectively more than 60 strains with occasional new strains arising. Vaccines can provide immunity, but each serotype requires its own specific vaccine. The disease is characterized by vesiculation or blistering of the hooves and oral cavity and on the mammary glands, leading to pain and discomfort, and to depression, anorexia, excessive salivation, lameness, and reluctance to move or stand, and causing production losses. The death loss is minimal, but there is a high rate of illness when a susceptible population is infected, and the disease has severe economic implications in the livestock industries. Because of how quickly FMD can spread, with nearly 100 percent of exposed animals ultimately becoming infected, and the significant economic losses it can cause, FMD is a worldwide concern. There is also concern that the FMD virus could be utilized by a terrorist organization or rogue state to perpetuate a terrorist attack against the United States by targeting the $100 billion/year U.S. livestock industry. In 2001, from February to September, an outbreak of FMD in the United Kingdom caused the slaughter of over 4 million animals of sheep, cattle, goats, and pigs to gain control of the disease. The FMD virus is found in all excretions and secretions of an infected animal. Transmission of the virus can be from contact with an infected animal, a contaminated environment used to house or transport susceptible animals, contaminated materials or fomites, people wearing contaminated clothes or footwear or using contaminated equipment, infected meat or animal products fed raw or improperly cooked to susceptible animals, contact with an infected carcass, and from aerosol spread of virus from an infected animal or property via air currents. Prompt reporting of suspicious signs of FMD to the proper agents (state veterinarians, federal animal disease control officials, or county agricultural agents will enable an investigation, testing, and containment should an outbreak occur. Laboratory testing is required to confirm the diagnosis. Stringent import and cross-border animal movement controls and surveillance are used in protection of FMD free countries. A response effort to eradicate any potential outbreaks include humane destruction of all infected, recovered and FMD-susceptible animals; appropriate disposal of animal carcasses and all animal products; surveillance and tracing of potentially infected or exposed livestock; strict quarantine and controls on movement of livestock, equipment, and vehicles; and, thorough disinfection of premises and all infected material (implements, cars, clothes, etc.).

=== Glanders ===
Glanders is a highly infectious zoonotic disease of equines caused by the bacterium Burkholderia mallei. It can also be contracted by goats, dogs, and cats. Humans are also susceptible, with a 95% fatality rate in untreated sepsis cases, and thus the organism is considered a potential bioterrorism agent. Glanders is one of the oldest diseases known and was once worldwide, but has been eradicated from most countries by mid-1900s. Now uncommon, outbreaks are reported from the Middle East, Pakistan, India, Mongolia, China, Brazil, and Africa. Glanders is transmitted mainly by contact with infected horses, mules, and donkeys through their respiratory secretions and exudates from skin lesion, or orally by shared water troughs, or by fomites. Some animals die quickly within a few weeks, while others become chronically infected and continue to spread the disease for years before succumbing. The clinical signs in equids is categorized into nasal, pulmonary, and cutaneous forms. Nasal glanders begins clinically with a high fever, then presents with a highly infectious, viscous, yellowish-green, mucopurulent discharge with possible crusting around the nares. Pulmonary glanders usually requires several months to develop, first manifesting through fever, dyspnea, paroxysmal coughing or persistent dry cough accompanied by labored breathing, possible diarrhea and polyuria, with all leading to a progressive loss of condition. Cutaneous glanders develops insidiously over an extended period, beginning with coughing and dyspnea usually associated with periods of exacerbation leading to progressive debilitation, and may also include fever, and enlargement of the lymph nodes. Clinical cases are often a combination of forms, and may be acute or subacute, chronic, or latent, although horses usually develop chronic glanders which is eventually fatal in most animals. There is no vaccine, and treatment of horses with antibiotics may be effective but is only used in endemic areas because treatment does not reliably produce a bacteriologic cure and may lead to subclinical carrier animals which can then infect humans and other animals. Diagnosis of glanders in animals is performed at an appropriate biosafety and containment level laboratory by isolating the organism from blood, sputum, urine, or skin lesions, or by serological testing. Prevention of glanders depends on early detection and the humane euthanasia of positive animals along with strict animal movement controls, effective premise quarantines, the burning and burying of affected animal carcasses, the burning and burying of disposable materials on positive premises, and the thorough cleaning and disinfection of outbreak areas, transportation vehicles, and equipment. "Glanders in horses is a re-emerging zoonotic disease. Successful eradication and control of glanders can only be achieved by combining highly sensitive and specific testing methods with effective culling strategies. Close cooperation between authorities and owners, as well as the strict compliance to biosafety approaches in animal holdings are essential."

=== Rinderpest ===
Rinderpest is an extinct relative of the measles virus, that infected even-toed ungulates including domestic cattle, deer and giraffes.

=== Teschen disease ===
Teschen disease is a form of encephalomyelitis found in pigs and caused by Teschovirus A.

=== Screwworms ===
Cochliomyia hominivorax, the primary screwworm, is a parasite that lays its eggs in the living tissue of mammals, including humans, targeting existing wounds, including the navels of newborns. It has been officially eradicated from the United States, but occasional outbreaks do occur. The USDA maintains a screwworm containment program in Panama that deposits 14.7 million sterile flies along the Colombian border every week.
