= SS Iberian =

SS Iberian is the name of the following ships:

- SS Iberian (1867), ran aground and wrecked 21 November 1885
- SS Iberian (1900), sunk by SM U-28 on 30 July 1915

== See also ==
- Iberian (disambiguation)
- SS Iberia
