= U-28 creature =

Alleged sea monster

- The U-28 creature as illustrated by Richard Hennig based on Georg-Günther Frierherr von Fostner's descriptions published in 1935 German sea monster book Begegnungen mit Seeungeheuern.

Creature information
- Other name(s): U-28 monster, U-28 sea serpent, Undersea crocodile
- Grouping: Sea monster
- Sub grouping: Living dinosaur
- Similar entities: UB-85 monster; Gambo

Origin
- First attested: 30 July 1915 (sighted); 1933 (publicised)
- Region: Celtic Sea (North Atlantic Ocean)

The U-28 creature was an enormous marine reptile alleged to have been sighted by the commander of the German U-boat SM U-28 Kapitänleutnant Georg-Günther Freiherr von Forstner (1882–1940) and his crew on 30 July 1915 during the sinking of the SS Iberian, a British steamer cargo vessel en route to Boston, Massachusetts.

== Encounter ==
On 30 July 1915, the SS Iberian was en route to Boston, Massachusetts with a general cargo of 4,738 tonnes (5,223 tons) from Manchester, England, having left in late July. The vessel was torpedoed by U-28 in the Celtic Sea of the north Atlantic Ocean about 9 nautical miles (17 km; 10 mi) southwest off Fastnet Lighthouse, Ireland. There were seven casualties. The 183-metre (600 ft) vessel sank remarkably quickly, the bow sticking "almost vertically into the air" according to von Forstner. Among the debris propelled out of the water from a formidable explosion from the sunken Iberian was a "gigantic sea animal". von Forstner described this encounter in 1933 in the following quote from German newspaper article Das schottische Seeungeheuer schon von U.28 gesichtet (The Scottish sea monster already sighted by U.28) published by Deutsche Allgemeine Zeitung, Tübingen, and translated into English in cryptozoologist Bernard Heuvelmans 1969 book; In the wake of sea-serpents:

"On 30 July 1915 our U 28 torpedoed the British steamer Iberian (5,223 tons) carrying a rich cargo in the North Atlantic. The steamer, which was about 600 feet long, sank quickly, the bow sticking almost vertically into the air, towards the bottom a thousand fathoms or more below. When the steamer had been gone for about 25 seconds, there was a violent explosion at a depth which it was clearly impossible for us to know, but which we can reckon, without risking being far out, at about 500 fathoms. A little later pieces of wreckage, and among them a gigantic sea-animal, writhing and struggling wildly, were shot out of the water to a height of 60 to 100 feet.

At that moment I had with me in the conning tower my officers of the watch, the chief engineer, the navigator, and the helmsman. Simultaneously we all drew one another’s attention to this wonder of the seas. As it was not in Brockhaus nor in Brehm we were, alas, unable to identify it. We did not have the time to take a photograph, for the animal sank out of sight after 10 or 15 seconds ... It was about 60 feet long, was like a crocodile in shape and had four limbs with powerful webbed feet and a long tail tapering to a point.

That the animal should have been driven up from a great depth seemed to me very understandable. After the explosion, however it was caused, the ‘under-water crocodile,’ as we called it, was shot upwards by the terrific pressure until it leapt out of the water gasping and terrified."

— Gorg-Günther Feiherr von Forstner, In the wake of sea-serpents (1969), pp. 394–395

The creature or its kin were said to have been sighted intermittently between 1919-1933, and von Forstner maintained that the creature was exactly 18-20m (60-66ft) (Note: Heuvelmans' In the wake of sea serpents states that the creature was 60 feet long, while Ley's Exotic Zoology claims it to be 66 feet long. The discrepancy may be caused by mistranslations of the original account from German to English.) in length, claiming he would not give up a single metre of length of the animal in his subsequent recounts of the sighting. It was suggested at the time that encounters with sea monsters akin to the U-28 creature had decreased in frequency by the mid-20th century as a result of louder motors and propellors on new models of sea faring vessels scaring away undiscovered marine megafauna. While the creature is commonly depicted as a giant marine crocodile as per von Forstner's description, Captain George Hope of the H.M.S. Fly, one of the few other eyewitnesses to view the creature when it was airborne claims it to have been crocodilian in appearance though with a long neck reminiscent of plesiosaurs. von Forstner's description of the creature possessing "webbed feet" are not congruent with Pliosauroidea, a frequently suggested identity for the animal in contemporary discussion.

In sea monster enthusiast James B. Sweeney's retelling of the account in his 1972 book; A pictoral history of sea monsters and other dangrous marine life, he adds a supposed additional quote from von Forstner;

"The explanation of the event seems easy to me. The explosion of, or in, the sinking steamer caught the 'undersea crocodile' as we came to call it, and ejected it out of the water."

— James B. Sweeney, A pictoral history of sea monsters and other dangrous marine life (1972), p. 112

This quote is highly dubious, as it is not compiled alongside his more well-documented account as seen in other discussions of the encounter outside of Sweeney's work, and is likely a fantastical fabrication inserted into the account in order to romanticise the story or add additional details to aid its credibility. In the alleged quote, von Forstner proposes that the creature was launched from the water as a direct result of the force expelled from the explosion, somehting that has been directly opposed in contemporary discussion of the legitimacy of the U-28 creature account.

== Publicisation and scepticism ==
=== Loch Ness Monster craze ===
The publicisation of the Loch Ness Monster in 1933 meant that sea serpents and sea monsters quickly entered the public zietgeist of western Europe, propagating myths of late-surviving "saurians" (Note: "Saurian" was a term broadly used in cryptozoological discussion to encompass late-surviving primitive dinosaurs based in anachronistic and fantasised portrayals of Mesozoic life during much of the early to mid 20th century, particularly during the advent of the Loch Ness Monster. In modern taxonomy, the term refers instead to the last common ancestor of Archosaurs and Lepidosaurs and all of its descendants.) in remote parts of the globe. As part of the craze, von Forstner published his first account of the U-28 creature on the 19th of December, 1933 in the German newspaper Deutsche Allgemeine Zeitung, Tübingen in an article titled "Das schottische Seeungeheuer schon von U.28 gesichtet'', translating to "The Scottish Sea Monster already sighted by U.28", a tonally competitive title that sought to invalidate the 'discovery' of the Loch Ness Monster in Scotland and instead draw attention to von Forstner's account. While Willy Ley, author of 1959 cryptozoology book Exotic Zoology maintains that if von Forstner's account is to be trusted that it is older than the oldest contemporary accounts of the Loch Ness Monster, he heavily insinuates that von Forstner was compelled to release the account as a result of the media attention being awarded to the monster.

=== Logical fallacies and log inconsistencies ===
A commonly held notion in both historic and contemporary discussion of von Forstner's account and the existence of the U-28 creature is that it is physically impossible for an undersea explosion to propel a creature of such size and weight so high into the air.

Heuvelmans argues that for the wreck to sink to a depth of "a thousand fathoms or below" so quickly, it would have to sink at a speed of at least 90 miles p/hour (145km p/hour), and satirically jabs that "to sink even 100 fathoms in 25 seconds would be good going". He also states that even if the explosion occurred at a minimum of 50 fathoms that it would not be able to rapidly propel both the creature and so much debris so high into the air so quickly and that, if the sighting is to be believed, the creature likely breached from being severely disorientated or startled by the underwater explosion. He posits that if it did exist, the U-28 creature was likely not an abyssal animal, and rather one that stayed close to the surface.

Similarly to Heuvelmans, British palaeontologist Darren Naish, co-author of Cryptozoologicon, a 2013 compendium and analysis of cryptids through a contemporary scientific lens, rejects the idea that the U-28 could have possibly been launched so high into the air at the size it was described by von Forstner, going as far as to dispel the sighting as a total fabrication. Naish argues further that the absence of the creature from von Forstner's ship logs, as well as von Forstner's own journal is indicative of fabrication and the creation of a sea monster story in the wake of the popularity of the Loch Ness Monster. Naish also scrutinises the popularised drawing of the U-28 creature originally illustrated by Richard Hennig for the 1935 German sea monster book; Begegnungen mit Seeungeheuern. Naish claims that the representation of the monster was almost certainly drawn from the reference of a stuffed baby crocodile rather than from direct eyewitness testimony by von Forstner. Perhaps most damningly, Naish notes that the 60 survivors of the SS Iberian do not at all recall an animal akin to an underwater crocodile breaching the surface during the vessel's sinking.

== See also ==
- Gambo (cryptid)
