= Sea serpent =

Type of sea monster described in religion, mythology, and folklore

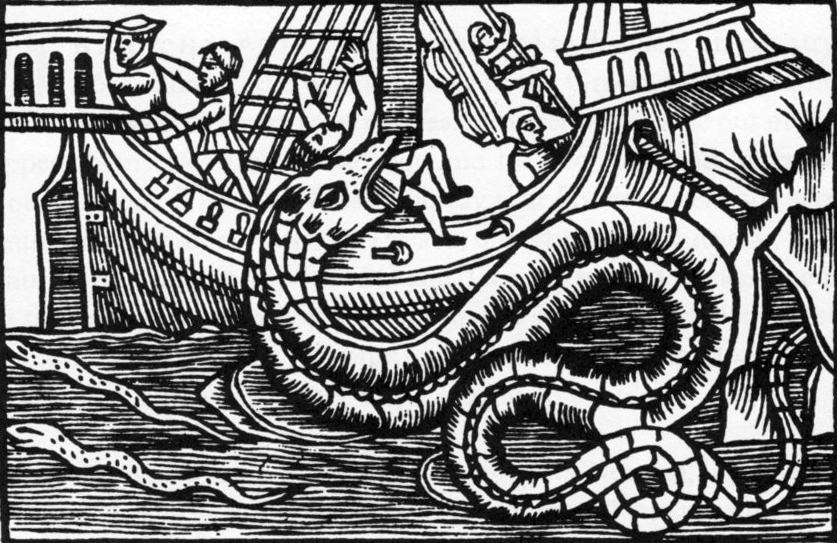
A sea serpent. ―From Magnus, Olaus (1555). History of the Northern Peoples.

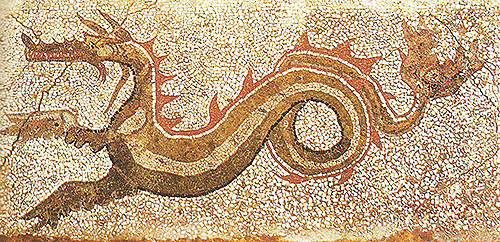
Mosaic of a cetus sea serpent of Greek mythology

A sea serpent is a type of sea monster described in various mythologies, religious texts, and folklore. Famous sea serpents include: the Mesopotamian Tiamat; Ugaritic Yam and Tannin; Judaic Leviathan and Rahab; ancient Greek Cetus, Echidna, Hydra, and Scylla; Vedic Vritra and Surasa; and the Norse Jörmungandr.

== Mythology ==
=== Mediterranean and Asia ===
The Drachenkampf mytheme, the chief deity in the role of the hero slaying a sea serpent, is widespread both in the ancient Near East and in Indo-European mythology, e.g. Lotan and Hadad, Tiamat and Marduk (see also Labbu, Bašmu, Mušḫuššu), Illuyanka and Tarhunt, Yammu and Baal in the Baal Cycle, et cetera. The Hebrew Bible maintains a similar narrative regarding Leviathan in Isaiah 27:1 and Psalm 74:14, and generally features descriptions of legendary sea creatures as part of creation under Yahweh's command, such as the Tanninim mentioned in the Book of Genesis 1:21 and the "great serpent" of Amos 9:3. In the Aeneid, a pair of sea serpents killed Laocoön and his sons when Laocoön argued against bringing the Trojan Horse into Troy. Claudius Aelianus in his work On the Nature of Animals mentions a giant sea centipede, which has a tail that is similar to a crayfish and which moves using numerous feet on each side of its body. Guillaume Rondelet mentions a similar legendary creature called the centipede cetacean in his work L'histoire entière des poissons. Similarities between ancient accounts of myriapod-like sea monsters have also been drawn to a sea creature of Vietnamese folklore known as the con rit, which translates to "centipede".

=== Germanic Scandinavia ===
In Nordic mythology, Jörmungandr (or Midgarðsormr) was a sea serpent or worm so long that it encircled the entire world, Midgard. Sea serpents also appear frequently in later Scandinavian folklore, particularly that of Norway, such as an account from 1028 AD wherein Saint Olaf was said to have killed a sea serpent in Valldal, heaving its body onto the mountain Syltefjellet. Marks on the mountain are associated with the legend.

== Alleged historical accounts ==
=== Hellenistic period ===
An apparent eye-witness account is given by Aristotle in his work Historia Animalium on natural history. Strabo makes reference to an eyewitness account of a dead sea creature sighted by Poseidonius on the coast of the northern Levant. Dated to sometime between 130 and 51 BC, Strabo reports the following:

As for the plains, the first, beginning at the sea, is called Macras, or Macra-Plain. Here, as reported by Poseidonius, was seen the fallen dragon, the corpse of which was about a plethrum [30 metres or 100 feet] in length, and so bulky that horsemen standing by it on either side could not see one another, and its jaws were large enough to admit a man on horseback, and each flake of its horny scales exceeded an oblong shield in length.

=== Norway, 16th century ===
Map showing observations and legends of sea/lake serpents in Scandinavia. A common trait is that the serpents are often said to have a horse-like head, regardless if they were seen in the ocean or in fresh water. The alleged sightings frequently use the common term "serpent" regardless of exact physical description, though reports 8 and 12 are explicitly claimed to be "krakens".

Swedish ecclesiastic and writer Olaus Magnus, archbishop of Uppsala, included illustrations of sea serpents and other various marine monsters on his illustrated map, the Carta marina. In his 1555 work History of the Northern Peoples, Olaus gives the following description of a Norwegian sea serpent:

Those who sail up along the coast of Norway to trade or to fish, all tell the remarkable story of how a serpent of fearsome size, from 200 feet [60 m] to 400 feet [120 m] long, and 20 feet [6 m] wide, resides in rifts and caves outside Bergen. On bright summer nights this serpent leaves the caves to eat calves, lambs and pigs, or it fares out to the sea and feeds on sea nettles, crabs and similar marine animals. It has ell-long hair hanging from its neck, sharp black scales and flaming red eyes. It attacks vessels, grabs and swallows people, as it lifts itself up like a column from the water.

Norwegian Bishop Erik Pontoppidan (1698–1764) did not disbelieve the existence of sea serpents themselves, but doubted they would prey on ships and feed on humans, assuming a more cautious sentiment in that respect than Olaus. Nevertheless, a number of reports were made by sailors at the time that a sea serpent would destroy a ship by wrapping its coils around a vessel in order to drag it underwater. Sailors threatened by a sea serpent were said to have thrown large objects such as paddles or shovels overboard in the path of the creature, hoping that it would take the object and leave without destroying the ship.

=== Greenland in 1734 ===
Hans Egede's expedition, 1734

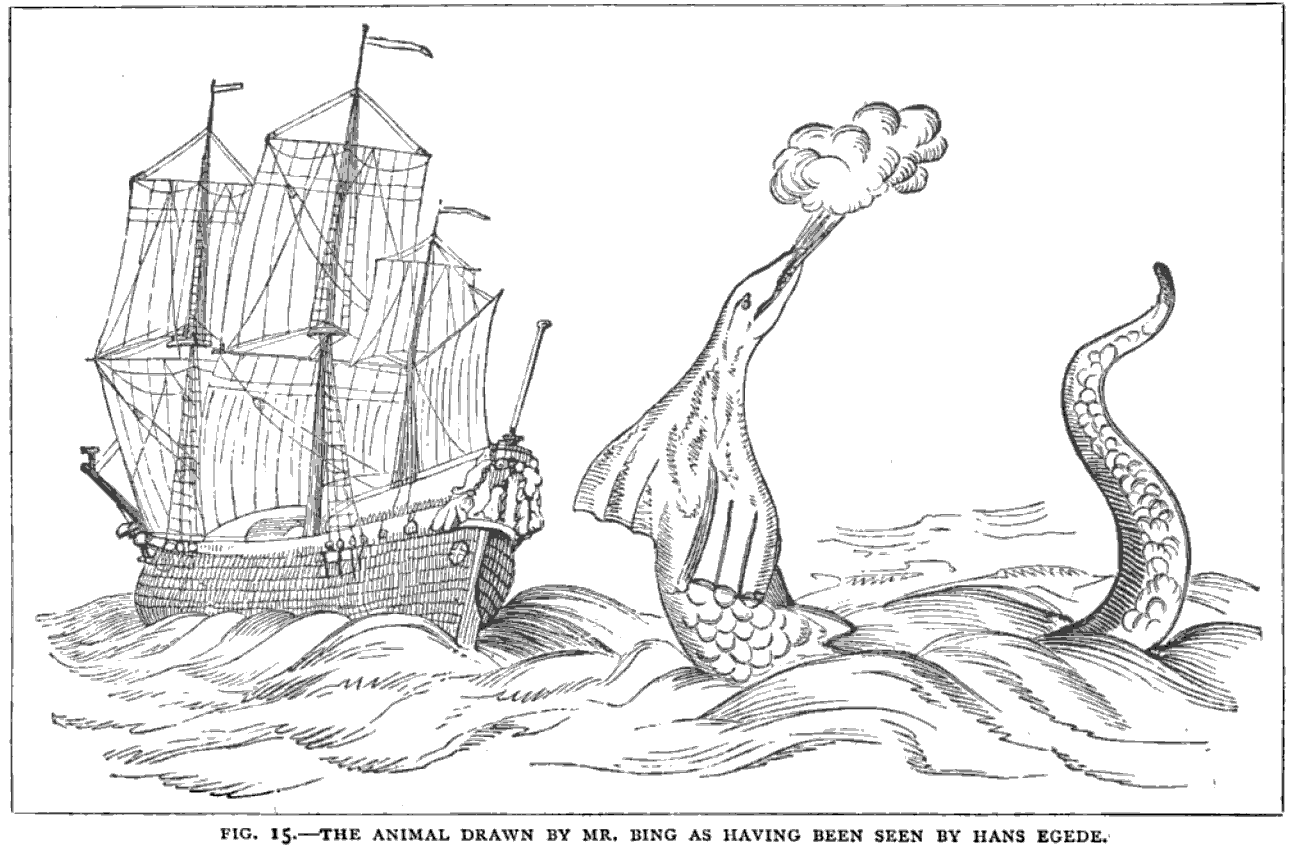
Sea serpent reported by Hans Egede, Bishop of Greenland, in 1734.
―After a sketch by Bing. Reproduced in Lee (1883a).

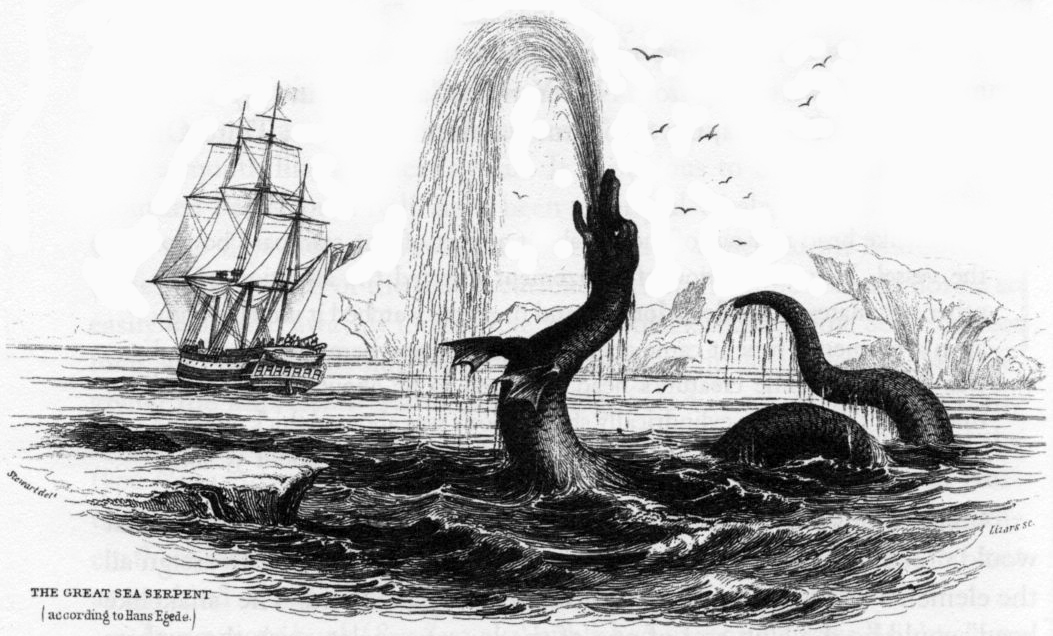
"The Great Sea Serpent (according to Hans Egede)".
―Engraving c. 1843, signed by artist James Hope Stewart.

Rev. Hans Egede, (Note: "The Apostle of Greenland") a Dano-Norwegian clergyman who was an early explorer and surveyor of Greenland, gave an 18th-century description of a sea serpent witnessed by his party. In his journal he wrote:

On the 6th of July, 1734, there appeared a very large and frightful sea monster, which raised itself so high out of the water that its head reached above our main-top (top of the mainmast). It had a long, sharp snout, and spouted water like a whale; and very broad flappers. The body seemed to be covered with scales, and the skin was uneven and wrinkled, and the lower part was formed like a snake. After some time the creature plunged backwards into the water, and then turned its tail up above the surface, a whole ship-length from the head. The following evening we had very bad weather" ―translated in Henry Lee (1883).

Egede also included the account in his book A Description of Greenland, noting that the unknown creature was spotted at the 64th degree of latitude, and was as thick or "bulky as the Ship, and three or four times as long". Egede himself did not supply a sketch in his otherwise well-illustrated work, but his comrade Bing, a fellow missionary, crafted an illustration that was reproduced in Henry Lee's The Great Sea-Serpent.

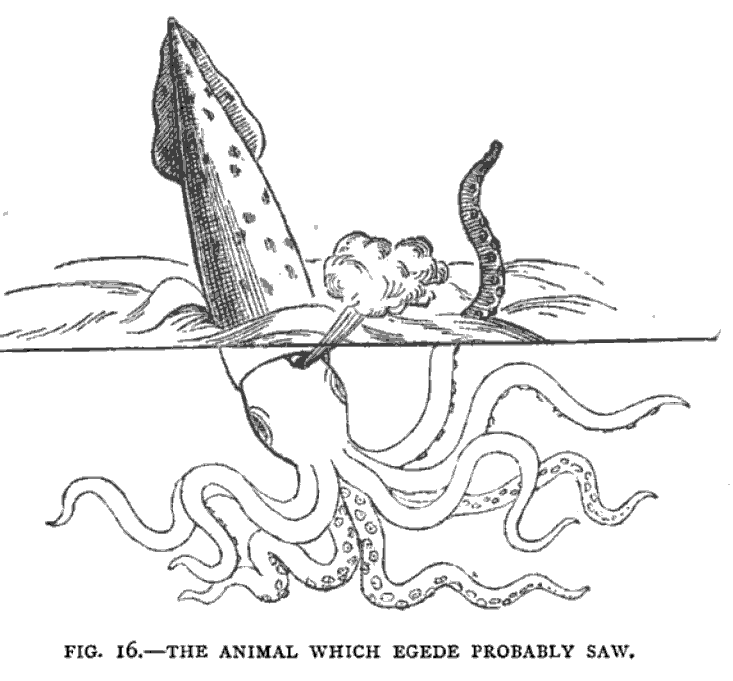
A giant squid proposed as the true identity of Hans Egede's sea serpent of 1734.

Bing further described this creature as having reddish eyes, which he described as almost burning with fire. This convinced Bishop Pontoppidan that this was distinct from the type of sea serpent witnessed by others. From Bing's drawing, Pontoppidan estimated the creature to be considerably shorter than the cable-rope-sized length of 100 fathoms (180 m or 200 yd) attested by multiple witnesses. The pair of fins were attached "below the waist (Danish: liv)" which, in Pontoppidan's view, emerged as another unusual feature.

Lee, however, proposed a prosaic explanation for this sea serpent, suggesting it was the misapprehended sighting of a giant squid's exposed head along with a single arm or tentacle (Cf. figure above left).

=== New York exhibition in 1845 ===
In 1845, a 35 m (115 ft) long skeleton allegedly belonging to an extinct sea serpent was exhibited in New York City by Albert C. Koch. This claim was dismissed by Prof. Jeffries Wyman, an anatomist who went to see the skeleton for himself. Wyman declared that the skull of the animal had to be mammalian in origin, and that the skeleton was composed of bones of several different animals, including an extinct species of whale.

=== Portuguese waters, 1848 ===
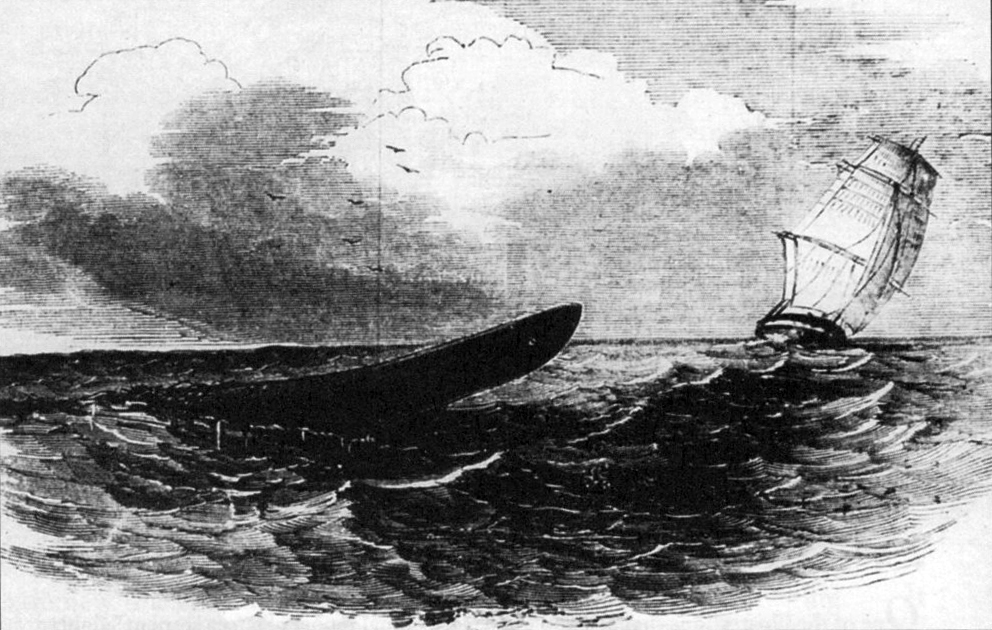
"Supposed Appearance of the Great Sea-Serpent, From H.M.S. Plumper, Sketched by an Officer on Board", Illustrated London News, 14 April 1849

On 6 August 1848, Captain M'Quhae of HMS Daedalus and several of his officers and crew (en route to Saint Helena) allegedly witnessed a sea serpent that was subsequently reported (and debated) in The Times. The vessel sighted what they classified as an enormous serpent between the Cape of Good Hope and Saint Helena. The creature was described as swimming with 1.2 metres (4 ft) of its head above the water, and they believed that there was another 18 metres (60 ft) of the animal's length beneath the surface. Captain M'Quhae also claimed that the creature "passed rapidly, but so close under our lee quarter, that had it been a man of my acquaintance I should have easily recognized his features with the naked eye." According to seven members of the crew, it remained within view for around twenty minutes. Another officer wrote that the creature was more of a lizard than a serpent. Evolutionary biologist Gary J. Galbreath contends that what the crew of Daedalus saw was actually a sei whale.

On 14 April of the following year, a report was published in the Illustrated London News of a sea serpent sighting off the Portuguese coast by HMS Plumper.

On the morning of the 31st December, 1848, in lat. 41° 13'N., and long. 12° 31'W., being nearly due west of Oporto, I saw a long black creature with a sharp head, moving slowly, I should think about two knots [3.7 km/h; 2.3 mph] ... its back was about twenty feet [6 m] if not more above water; and its head, as near as I could judge, from six to eight [1.8 to 2.4 m] ...There was something on its back that appeared like a mane, and, as it moved through the water, kept washing about; but before I could examine it more closely, it was too far astern

— "A Naval Officer"

=== Brazilian waters, 1875 ===
In 1875, Captain George Drevar reported a sighting by the crew of the Pauline near Cape São Roque:

The weather fine and clear, wind and sea-moderate. Observed some black spots on the water, and a whitish pillar, about thirty feet high above them. At the first glance I took all to be breakers as the sea was splashing up fountain-like about them, and the pillar a pinnacle rock, bleached with the sun; but the pillar fell with a splash, and a similar one rose. They rose and fell alternately in quick succession, and good glasses showed me it was a monstrous sea-serpent coiled twice round a large sperm-whale. The head and tail parts, each about thirty feet long were acting as levers, twisting itself and victim round with great velocity. They sank out of sight about every two minutes, coming to the surface still revolving; and the struggles of the whale and two other whales, that were near, frantic with excitement, made the sea in their vicinity like a boiling cauldron; and a loud and confused noise was distinctly heard. This strange occurrence last [sic] some fifteen minutes, and finished with the tail portion of the whale being elevated straight in the air, then waving backwards and forwards, and lashing the water furiously in the last death struggle, when the body disappeared from our view, going down head foremost to the bottom, where no doubt it was gorged at the serpent's leisure; and that monster of monsters may have been many months in a state of coma, digesting the huge mouthful. Then two of the largest sperm-whales that I have ever seen moved slowly thence towards the vessel, their bodies more than usually elevated out of water, and not spouting or making the least noise, but seeming quite paralized [sic] with fear; indeed, a cold shiver went through my own frame on beholding the last agonizing struggle of the poor whale that had seemed as helpless in the coils of the vicious monster as a small bird in the talons of a hawk. Allowing for two coils round the whale, I think the serpent was about 160 or 170 feet long, and 7 or 8 feet in girth. It was in colour much like a conger-eel; and the head, from the mouth being always open, appeared the largest part of its body. I wrote thusfar [sic], little thinking I would ever see the serpent again, but at seven A. M., July 13, in the same latitude, and some eighty miles east of San Roque I was astonished to see the same or a similar monster. It was throwing its head and about 40 feet of its body in a horizontal position out of water as it passed onwards by the stern of our vessel.

== Prosaic explanations ==
R.L. France proposed in a 2016 paper for the International Journal of Maritime History that a significant number of sea serpent sightings, including nineteenth century accounts of serpents attacking whales, were due to the misidentification of whales entangled in fishing gear and maritime debris.

Due to their size, elongated bodies, and undulating swimming pattern, giant oarfish are also presumed to have been responsible for some sea serpent sightings. A 2016 episode of the TV series River Monsters, seeking to uncover the origin of the sea serpent myth, concluded that the most likely culprit was the oarfish.

In a 2023 article for Fate, Karl Brandt suggested well-known sea serpent sightings could be explained by harpooned sperm whales held fast to their hunters’ overturned rowboats. The boats would accumulate debris at the surface which could stretch for hundreds of yards while appearing to be propelled through the water by unknown means. The theory was supported by the majority of sightings in Norwegian fjords occurring "during the summer months of June to August when the whales are most-plentiful".

== Gallery ==
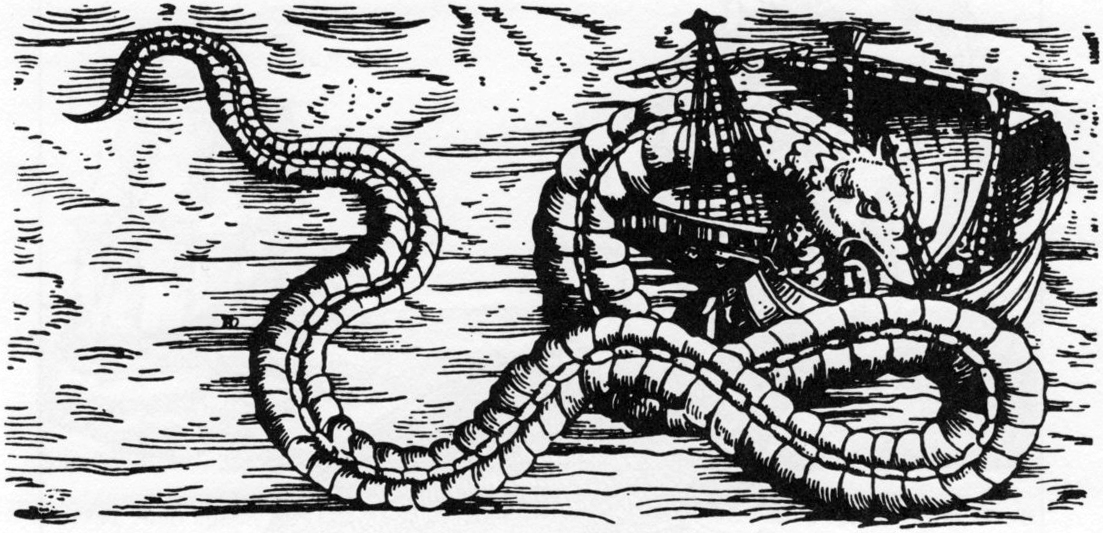
Olaus Magnus's Sea Orm, 1555

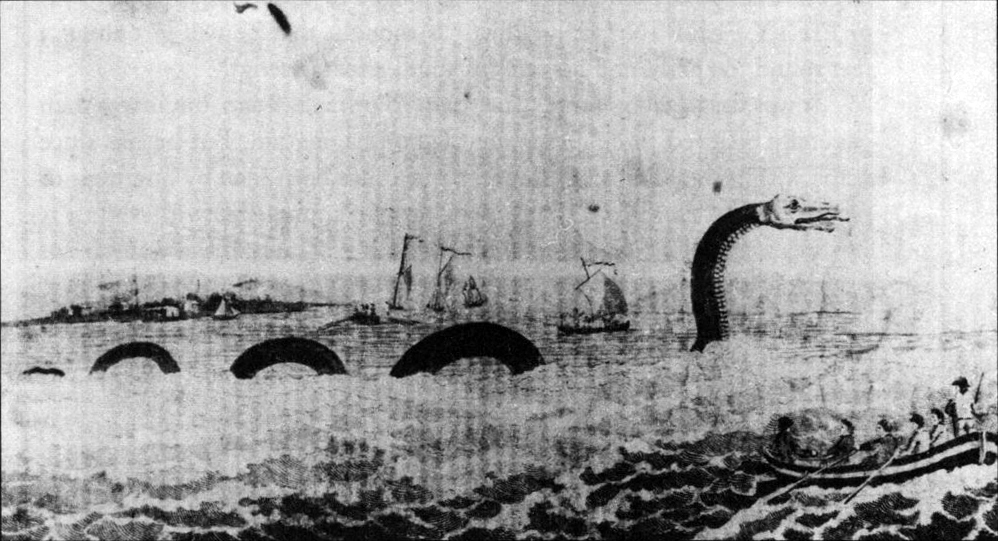
The first American sea serpent, reported from Cape Ann, Massachusetts, in 1639

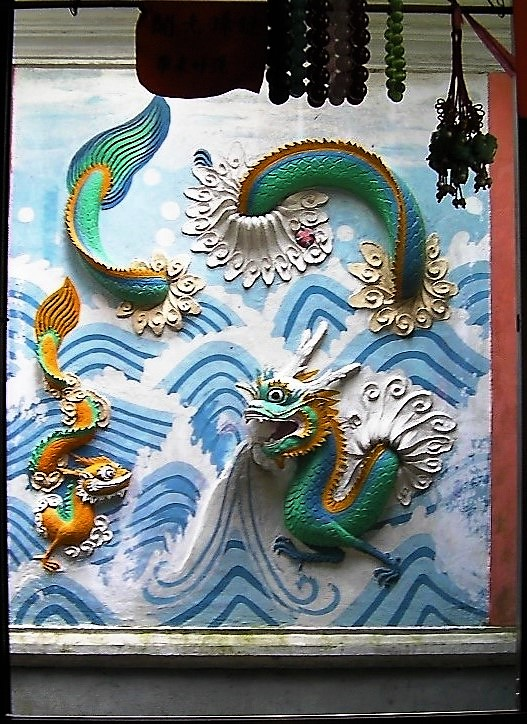
Sea serpents, Ama Temple, Macao

A sea serpent depicted in the coat of arms of Seljord in Norway

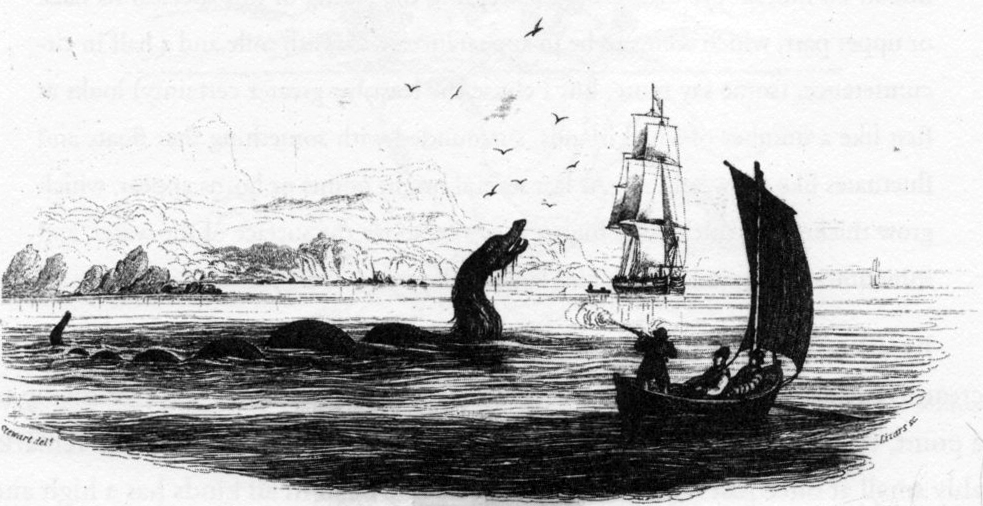
Maned sea serpent from Bishop Erik Pontoppidan's 1755 work Natural History of Norway

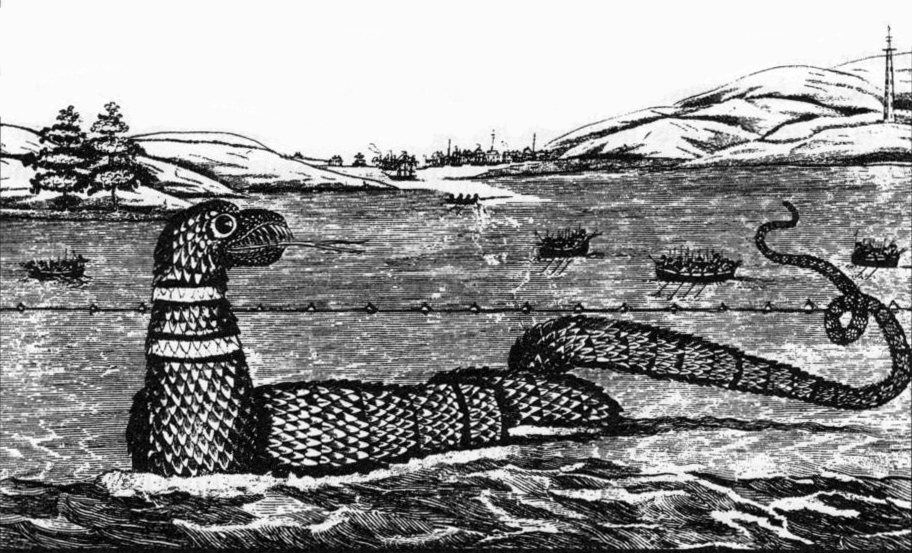
The Gloucester sea serpent of 1817

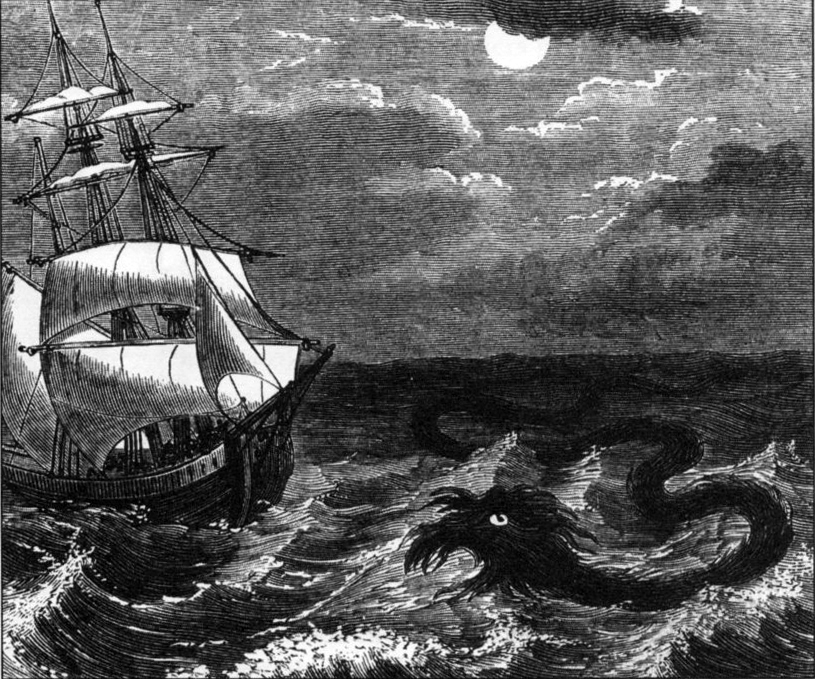
A hairy sea serpent

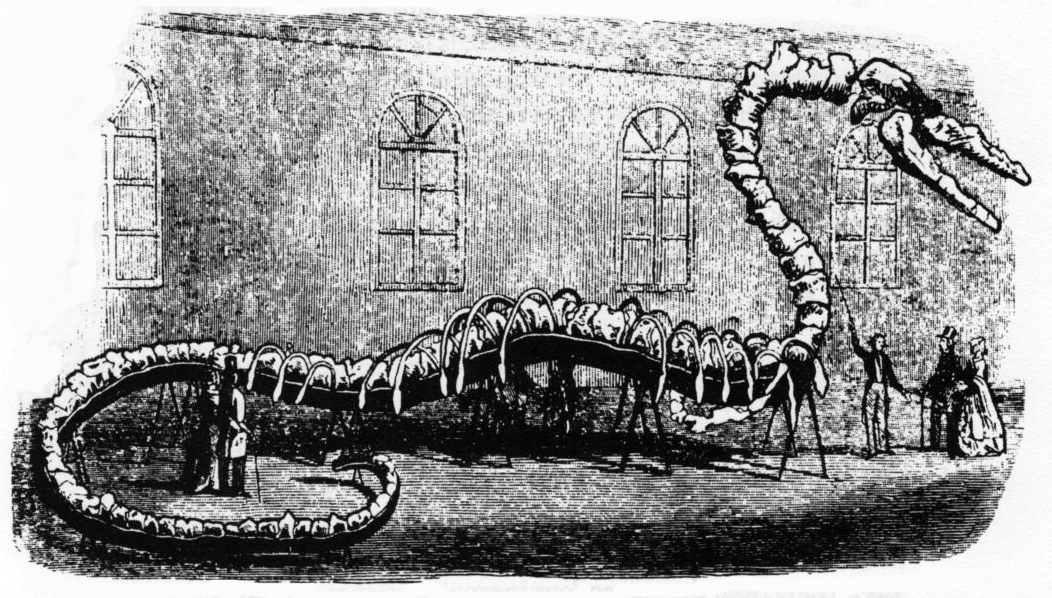
Albert Koch's 35-metre-long (115-foot) "Hydrarchos" fossil skeleton from 1845. It was found to be an assembled collection of bones from at least five fossil specimens of Basilosaurus.

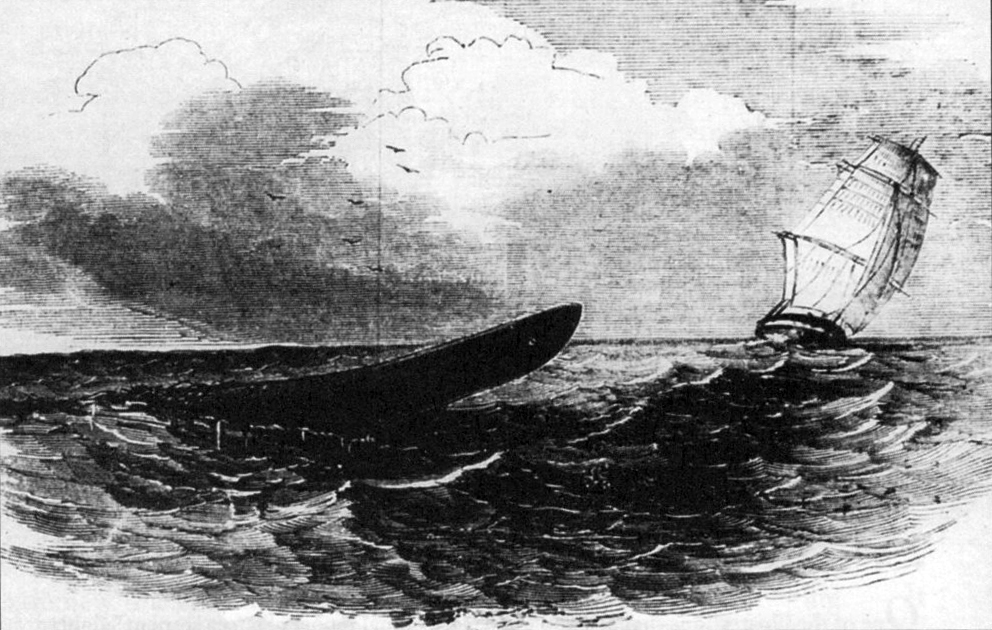
"Supposed Appearance Of The Great Sea-Serpent, From H.M.S. Plumper, Sketched By An Officer On Board", Illustrated London News, 14 April 1849

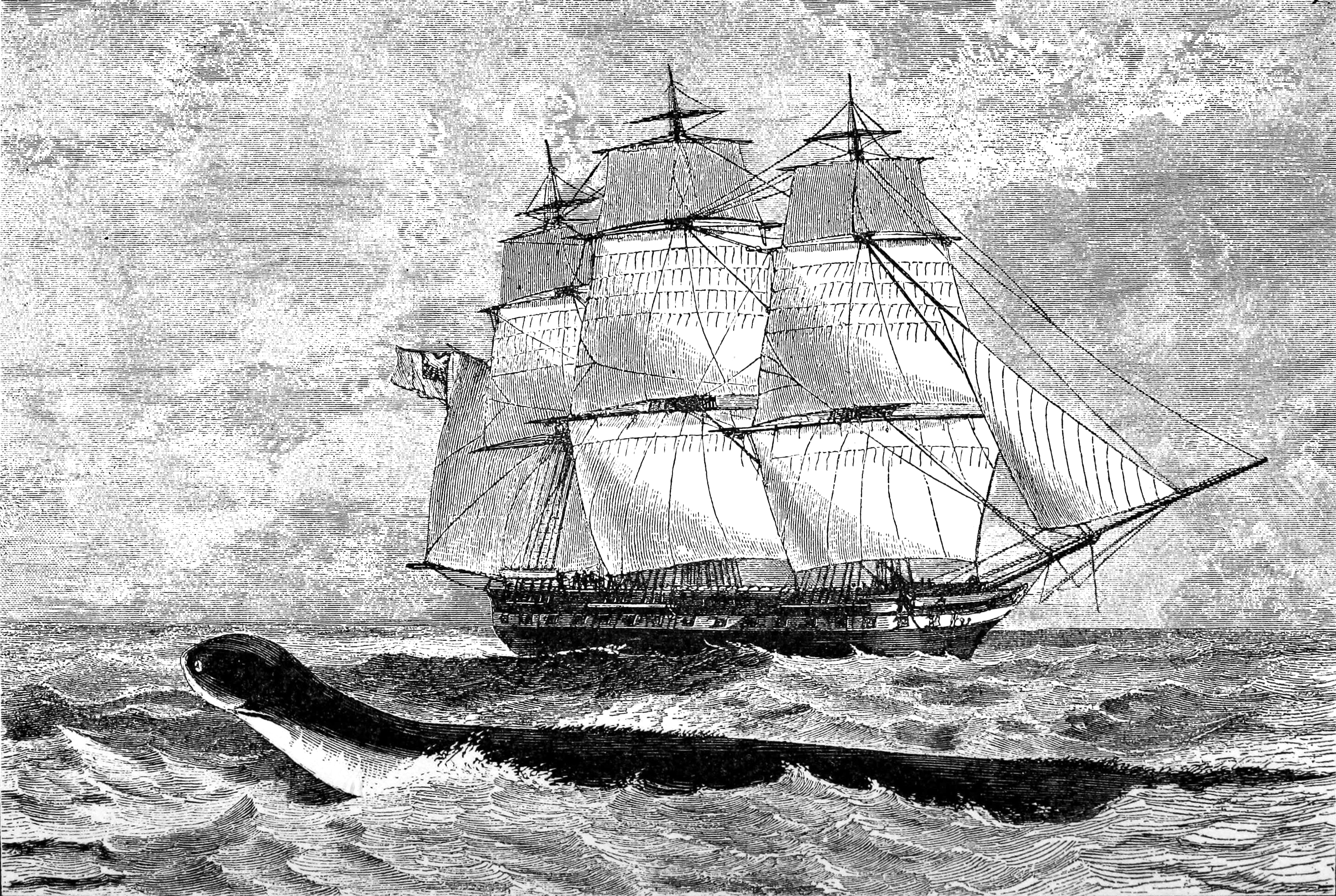
The sea serpent spotted by the crew of HMS Daedalus in 1848

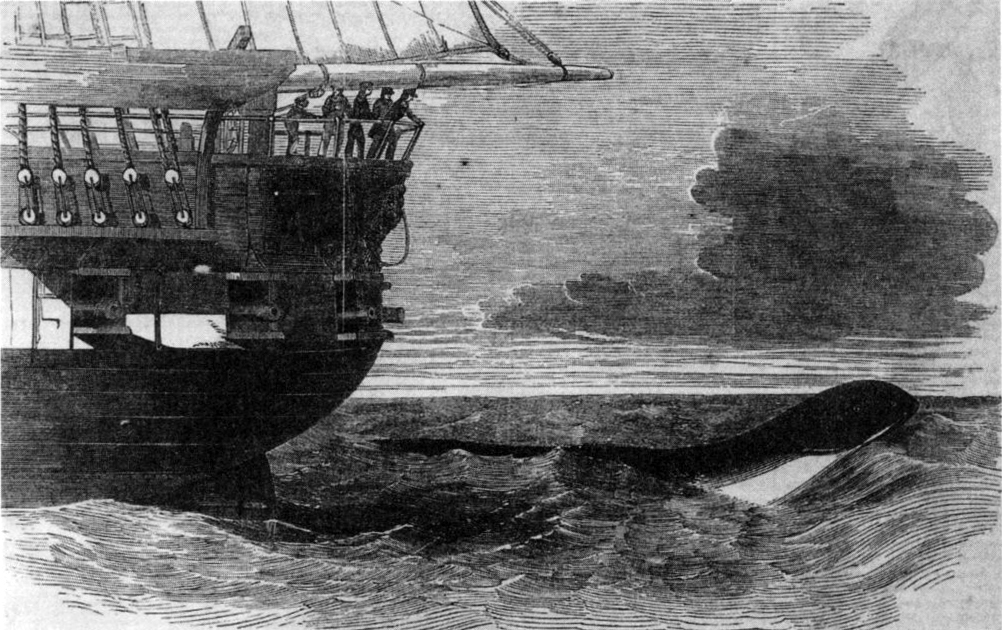
Another of the original illustrations of the HMS Daedalus encounter

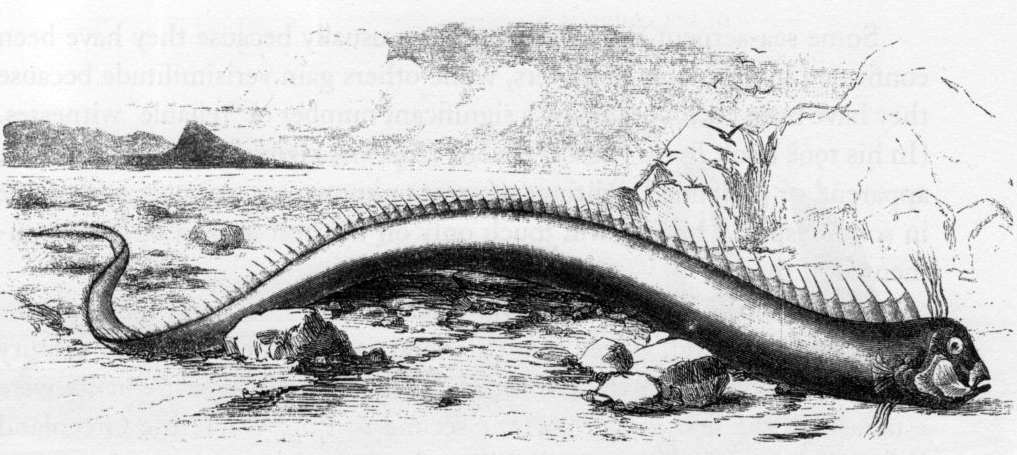
Oarfish that washed ashore on a Bermuda beach in 1860. The animal was 5 metres (16 ft) long and was originally described as a sea serpent.

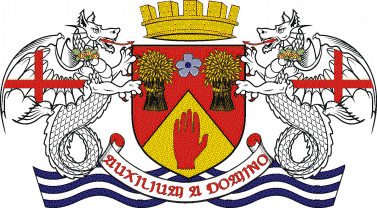
The arms of County Londonderry feature sea dragons as supporters.

== In media ==
- C. S. Lewis's The Chronicles of Narnia features a sea serpent as one of the many obstacles in The Voyage of the Dawn Treader. The serpent also appears in the 1989 TV serial and 2010 film adaptation.
- Beany and Cecil famously featured a seasick sea serpent. The series was later revived as The New Beany and Cecil Show by producer DIC Entertainment.

== See also ==
- Category: Sea serpents
- Bakunawa – Philippine mythological dragon
- Cadborosaurus – Sea monster named for Cadboro Bay in Canada
- Chinese dragon – Legendary Chinese creature
- Cirein-cròin – Sea monster from Scottish folklore, possibly serpentlike
- Gaasyendietha – Legendary serpent in Indigenous folklore
- Gambo – Gambian globster
- Giant oarfish – Species of oceanic ray-finned fish
- Gloucester sea serpent – Alleged sea monster off Cape Ann, Mass.
- Gyarados – Pokémon species
- HMS Daedalus (1826) – Frigate of the Royal Navy
- Hydrophiini – Clade of marine snakes
- Igopogo – Legendary lake monster of Lake Simcoe, Ontario
- Ikuchi – Legendary sea serpent yōkai in Japanese folklore
- Imugi – Legendary creature in Korean mythology (Korea)
- Jörmungandr – Sea serpent in Norse mythology
- Kraken – Mythical sea cryptid
- Leviathan – Biblical sea monster
- Lindworm – Dragon or serpent monster in Nordic mythology
- Manipogo – Legendary lake monster of Lake Manitoba
- Mizuchi – Water deity (Japan)
- Morgawr – Purported Cornish sea serpent
- Nāga – Legendary beings in the cultures and religions of tropical Asia
- Ogopogo – Creature in First Nations folklore and alleged lake monster
- Oilliphéist – Legendary serpent in Irish folklore
- Paleophiidae – Extinct family of snakes
- Pyrosome – Family of tunicates
- Seelkee – British Columbian lake monster
- Selma – Norwegian lake monster
- Skolopendra – Sea monster legend in classical Greco-Roman folklore
- Storsjöodjuret – Lake monster in Swedish folklore
- Stronsay Beast – Sea carcass found in Scotland in 1808
- U-28 creature – Alleged sea monster
- Yacumama – Legendary serpent in Amazonian folklore

== Bibliography ==
- Oudemans, A. C. (1892b). The Great Sea-serpent: An Historical and Critical Treatise. Vol. 1. Lackerbauer, P[ierre] (illustr.). Leiden: E.J. Brill. pp. 134, 414.
- Lee, Henry (1883a), "The Great Sea Serpent", Sea Monsters Unmasked, The Fisheries Exhibition Literature 3, London: William Clowes and Sons, pp. 52–103
- Ramsvig, S. A. (July–December 1902). "Sjø-ormens historie: Beretninger om dette hav-uhyres tilsynekomst". Kringsjaa (in Danish). 20: 267-275.
