= Gambo (cryptid) =

Gambian globster

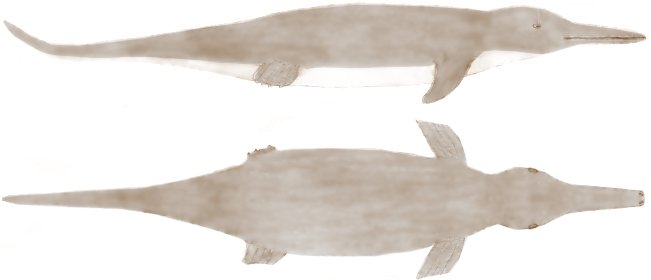
- Colourised illustration of Gambo based on descriptions by Owen Burnham.

Creature information
- Other name(s): Kunthum belein, Gambian sea serpent, the beaked beast of Bungalow Beach, the sea monster of West Africa, Gambonessa burnhami
- Grouping: Sea monster
- Sub grouping: Living dinosaur
- Similar entities: U-28 creature

Origin
- First attested: 12 June 1983
- Country: The Gambia
- Region: Bungalow Beach, Kotu, Gambia

Gambo is the name assigned to a carcass discovered on the shore of Bungalow Beach, Kotu, The Gambia, on the 12th of June 1983 by fifteen-year-old amateur wildlife enthusiast Owen Burnham. Its existence was first widely publicised by well-known British zoologist, author, and cryptozoologist Karl Shuker, who wrote about Gambo in a September/October 1986 article published in The Unknown, a now defunct British magazine discussing anomalous occurrences, where the globster was referred to as the Gambian sea serpent. It has also since been referred to as the "beaked beast of Bungalow Beach", in reference to its beak-like snout.

== Etymology ==
The name "Gambo" was first applied to the cryptid in the February/March 1993 Fortean Times piece "Gambo, the Beaked Beast of Bungalow Beach", an item written by the publication but credited to Shuker as it condensed much of the information from his previous 1986 article. "Gambo" seems to be an entirely arbitrary name with no particular significance to the specimen's identity aside from a vague phonetic similarity to its place of discovery. Shuker specifies that while the name is often attributed to his writings, he had no part in crafting the appellation and it was instead coined by the Fortean Times employee who penned the article. The "beaked beast of Bungalow Beach" is an alternate, fantastical moniker that this article likewise introduced, which has since been used in additional material discussing the cryptid. During the initial discovery of the carcass, Burnham, a fluent speaker of Mandinka, asked nearby locals to identify the creature, to which they responded by calling it "kunthum belein", which apparently translates to "cutting teeth". (Note: The term "kunthum belein" has been said to mean both "cutting teeth" and "dolphin" in the Mandinka language, seemingly varying between recounts of Burnham's discovery.)

Gambo has been classified as a "sea serpent" in much of the discussion surrounding its identity, a term which cryptozoologist Bernard Heuvelmans clarified is not a uniform classification for serpentine marine cryptids, but instead an umbrella term for the discussion of extinct marine reptiles, modified pinnipeds, giant turtles, giant eels, and archaeocete whales through a cryptozoological lens, in his 1969 book In the wake of sea-serpents.

== Discovery and description ==
On the 12th of June 1983, Owen Burnham discovered the Gambo carcass on Bungalow Beach, Gambia, whilst on holiday from Senegal with his family. Burnham described the carcass as being about 15 ft (4.6 m) long with a tail length of about 5 ft (1.5 m), dark in colouration with a white underbelly (countershaded), having a long beak, four claw-less paddle-like flippers, and a fluke-less tail. It possessed 80 conical teeth characteristic of homodont dentition, as well as small eyes, a domed forehead, and nostrils placed close to the end of its beak with no visible blowhole. The body appeared to exhibit bloating normally associated with dead cetaceans, but was otherwise in good condition despite actively undergoing decomposition (as evidenced by a foul smell reported by Burnham). The only sign of damage on the body was its right and left hind flippers, which were torn at the terminal and almost completely severed respectively. Upon discovery, the carcass was being readily dismembered and mutilated by two fishermen who intended to sell its head to a tourist. The decapitation reportedly took about twenty minutes due to the thickness of the creature's vertebra. The fishermen recognised the animal as a dolphin.

In 1986, BBC Wildlife published an interview with Owen Burnham, which eventually inspired Shuker's first writings of the carcass in The Unknown, as part of the fifth issue of their fourth volume discussing Gambo, where he publicly appealed for identification of the creature based on his descriptions. In his own independent search of the carcass' identity, Burnham asked local fishermen to draw the animal known to them regionally as the "kunthum belein", to which a dolphin was illustrated each time. Shuker attributes this to the Mandinka language's lack of distinction between species and the tendency to apply the same name to superficially similar species, positing that the fishermen were in fact familiar with Gambo's species, but were drawing the more common animals that they used the same name for. Conversely, no fishermen recognised Gambo based on Burnham's description of the carcass, making the lack of linguistic distinction between superficially similar animals seemingly inconsequential to the carcass' potential identity as an unknown species as they were not familiar with its physical description to begin with.

=== Discrepancies and anachronisms ===
There exist multiple discrepancies in subsequent retellings of Burnham's account, namely the chronology of events and description of Gambo, where small morphological details tend to vary. While Burnham's initial account explains that the animal was already being dismembered and decapitated upon his arrival, The Pine Barrens Institute, an online cryptozoological reference site, has since recounted that Burnham found the carcass undisturbed, examined and measured it, went back to his room at the Bungalow Beach Hotel, and returned the next day to find it had reportedly been mutilated and was now buried deep beneath the sand by locals. The detail about the head having been decapitated and sold to a tourist remains congruent with Burnham's own account. The temporal anachronisms are likely a result of the romanticisation of the story and the glorification of the potential for a new discovery.

Additional morphological discrepancies have also risen in prevalence in the years following the discovery, where the carcass has been described as having conflicting phenotypic traits between accounts. Shuker directly contradicts his own descriptions of the animal's colouration, claiming it to have been "brown above" in his The Unknown and Fortean Times articles, while later claiming it to have had "black upperparts" in his Strange Magazine article on sea serpents in 1995. Additionally, while Burnham explains the carcass was not seriously damaged, some contemporary secondary sources present the idea that the left hind flipper was so thoroughly torn from the body that viscera, including an intestinal tract, were visible from the open wound.

== Explanations and identity of the carcass ==
=== Potential identity ===
The domed forehead, beak, and 80 homodont teeth of the carcass have led to comparisons with cetaceans, namely the Shepherd's beaked whale (Tasmacetus shepherdi), which is superficially similar to the descriptions of Gambo, although it possesses a blowhole, a fluked tail, only two pectoral fins, and is known exclusively from the southern hemisphere. It is for these reasons that Shuker rules it out as a candidate for Gambo, and asserts that the carcass "could not have been any form of modern-day cetacean" in his Strange Magazine article. The Cuvier's beaked whale (Ziphius cavirostris) has also been similarly proposed, though the species' unique dentition and short beak would make it easily distinguishable. The carcass has also been likened to pinnipeds due to its apparent nostrils, developed hind legs, and tetrapodal morphology, as well as sirenians, though both were rejected by Shuker as he deemed neither to be entirely congruent with the appearance of the carcass. (Note: Shuker also compares the carcass to crocodilians in his 1993 Fortean Times article, which he rules out due to their fully developed legs that do not resemble flippers, and their thoroughly scaled skin that does not resemble the smooth texture described by Burnham.)

Much of the carcass' description can be loosely explained by cetacean taphonomy and the nature of decomposition in large marine megafauna. Gambo's characteristic lack of a dorsal fin and lizard-like, fluke-less tail are indicative of fairly active decomposition, as cartilagenous structures are the first to slough off of cetaceans during maceration in marine environments as they are not supported by the animal's skeleton and are also frequently lost to scavenging. Alterations to the morphology of marine megafauna have resulted in similar misidentifications, such as in the case of the Zuiyo Maru carcass of 1977, which was misinterpreted as a plesiosaur carcass, though later identified as the badly decomposed body of a basking shark (Cetorhinus maximus). Burnham did note a foul smell emanating from the carcass in his initial account, a fact corroborated in Shuker's writings that points to decomposition. Additionally, the carcass' bloated appearance is another trait of cetacean decomposition, where fermentation of gut bacteria or methanogenesis occurs, bloating the corpse and allowing it to float on the water's surface until becoming beached, or being decomposed by marine scavengers.

A prevailing idea in cryptozoological discussion is that a sizeable demographic of earth's life – including large conspicuous organisms – has yet to be formally described, and the coelacanth, a lazarus taxon rediscovered millions of years after its presumed "Cretaceous" (Note: While Shuker correctly identifies that the coelacanth did disappear from the fossil record in the late Cretaceous in his 1993 Fortean Times article, he incorrectly places its disappearance 64 million years ago in what is instead the Cenozoic.) extinction, is cited by Shuker with the aim of supporting this hypothesis. One explanation thus posits that Gambo is an example of an entirely unknown species of extant and undescribed marine reptile. However, the likelihood of large Mesozoic sea life surviving into the present day is generally considered extremely low in the scientific community, as the fossil record for massive marine vertebrates is considered more robust and less easily capable of being overlooked than that of coelacanths.

=== Living fossil explanation ===
A common cryptozoological trope is the tendency to claim that a given cryptid (typically a reptile or reptile-adjacent creature) is the descendent of or a sole representative of a long extinct order of perceivably "primitive" life. In the first volume of Cryptozoologicon, a cryptozoological examination of the tropes and scientific justifications of cryptids authored by palaeontologist Darren Naish and co-authored by artist C.M. Kösemen and paleoartist John Conway, this trope is coined the "Prehistoric Survivor Paradigm" (PSP), and is directly used to challenge the notion that Gambo is a living member of Polycotyloid plesiosaurs, Pliosauroidea, or Metriorhynchid crocodylomorphs.

In Heuvelmans' In the wake of sea-serpents, he propagates the PSP throughout his descriptions of various sea-serpents, implying a significant percentage are "prehistoric" or "archaic" and more reminiscent of extinct life than extant life. Gambo has similarly been implied by Shuker and some contemporary authors as being potentially an example of an extant representative of Pliosauroides, Thalattosuchia, or Mosasauria. Shuker even goes as far as to claim that Pliosaurs or Thallatosuchians are the only two clades that sufficiently resemble the carcass' morphology in his Strange Magazine article, opining that Burnham's intimate familiarity with West African fauna means he likely did not misidentify the carcass of a known animal. Gambo is likened to extinct marine reptiles in his writings because of superficial similarities described by Burnham, such as its short neck, prominent toothed beak, four flippers, and long tail roughly congruent with the clades in question (though Gambo was said to be claw-less, a feature inconsistent with clawed Thalattosuchia). Shuker notes: "the Gambian sea serpent would seem to offer some of the most provocative evidence currently available in support of the scientifically undiscovered, modern-day existence of one group of prehistoric reptiles!" due almost entirely to its morphological similarities to the specified groups. (Note: On his blog, ShukerNature, while Shuker does compare Gambo to extinct marine reptiles, he stresses that "without having first examined physical evidence it would be ridiculous to make any firm assertion as to this animal's taxonomic identity – which is why I have never done so.")

== Speculative zoology ==
Cryptozoologicon analyses and reimagines cryptids as viable species through means of speculative evolution, scrutinising original accounts of monsters and creatures of cryptozoological folklore and revising them to be scientifically plausible reconstructions of their original mythos in a creative exercise. Naish reimagines Gambo as the fictional Gambonessa burnhami, a fully-aquatic marine monotreme of the platypus lineage derived from Cretaceous era Zealandia that has evolved polyphyodont teeth enclosed in a bill, and has lost its claws due to being viviporous and no longer needing to dig into shores and sandbanks to lay eggs as a result. G. burnhami is illustrated in this fictitious scenario as having been able to grow much larger than other monotremes due to its viviparity, being hairless and smooth skinned with blubber, and using its bill to electrolocate prey on the seafloor, as well as having colonised the Atlantic and Indian Oceans from its evolutionary origin in the southwest Pacific. Naish explains the Gambo carcass as having lost its leathery bill sheath with decomposition, where its teeth and dentition were easily mistaken as being reptilian in this speculative scenario. (Note: The G. burnhami scenario is not a legitimate explanation for Gambo and rather a creative speculative thought experiment.)

== Scepticism ==
Darren Naish, a vocal critic of Gambo being an example of late-surviving marine reptiles, has posited that it would not be unreasonable for Gambo to have been an example of a mangled dolphin carcass, mainly citing that Burnham's family reportedly believed the carcass to be that of a cetacean and that the fishermen and local communities believed the carcass to be a dolphin and associated descriptions of the carcass with a dolphin. Naish also cites that four-finned dolphins have been recorded since the sighting, namely one instance in October of 2006 where a four-finned bottlenose dolphin (Tursiops sp.) was captured off the coast of Taiji, Japan, its unusual number of fins attributed to atavism. A dolphin with this rare trait could serve as the identity for the carcass, assuming the fluke had been removed via decomposition or scavenging. The supernumerary hind flippers of the dolphin were about the size of human hands and were fully developed. Naish also states that the large marine species that Gambo represents would not be able to avoid appearing in the fossil record, and thus would already have been discovered and described if it were a unique species.

== 2006 CFZ expedition ==
In 2006, twenty-three years after the initial discovery of the carcass, an expedition was organised by the Centre for Fortean Zoology (CFZ) to Gambia in order to pursue a different cryptid, the dragon-like Ninki Nanka, as well as look for the Armitage's cylindrical skink (Chalcides armitagei), a species which had been rediscovered just seventeen years earlier in 1989 after having been first described in 1922. Among their goals was to examine the original stranding site of Gambo on Bungalow Beach and excavate the burial site of the carcass in order to attain physical evidence of its existence. The site was found to have been too thoroughly altered by both artificial and natural means, including perhaps most significantly, the construction of a nightclub overtop of the alleged burial itself. After multiple failed attempts to locate and excavate the remains, most of the expedition crew had concluded that the bones had likely been lost to natural decomposition processes, citing that the ready collapse of excavations under sediment and the quick flooding of any deep dig sites with ocean water likley meant that the bones had rotted with erosion. That Gambo likely represented the carcass of a known species of rare dolphin or young beaked whale was a commonly held hypothesis among the crew.

== See also ==
- U-28 creature
