= Brehm (surname) =

Brehm is a German surname. Notable people with the surname include:

- Alfred Brehm (1829–1884), German zoologist
- Bruno Brehm (1892–1974), German writer
- Christian Ludwig Brehm (1787–1864), German pastor and ornithologist
- Charles Brehm (1925–1996), witness to the assassination of President John F. Kennedy
- C. E. Brehm, president of the University of Tennessee
- Elsebeth Brehm (1901–1995), Danish tennis player
- Helene Brehm (1862–1932), German school teacher, poet, and author
- Jack W. Brehm (1928–2009), psychologist
- Joachim Brehm (1789–1860), pharmacist, botanist and plant collector
- Marie C. Brehm (1859–1926), American politician
- Paul Brehm, American biologist
- Sebastian Brehm (born 1971), German politician
- Sharon Brehm (1945–2018), American psychologist
- Simon Brehm, Swedish double-bass player
- Walter E. Brehm (1892–1971), American politician
- Ward Brehm, Minnesota entrepreneur
- William K. Brehm (1929–2025), American businessman and statesman
