= Brehm =

Brehm may refer to:

- 7054 Brehm, an asteroid
- Brehm (surname)
- Christian Ludwig Brehm, German pastor and ornithologist(1787–1864)
- Brehm Preparatory School
- standard botanist author abbreviation of Joachim Brehm
