= UB-85 monster hoax =

1918 sea monster hoax

UB-85 monster
- Artist's interpretation of the sea monster described to have attacked the UB-85.

Creature information
- Other name(s): UB-85 sea monster, UB-85 atrocity, Nessie's saltwater cousin
- Grouping: Sea monster
- Similar entities: U-28 creature; Loch Ness Monster

Origin
- First attested: 28 April 1918 (encountered); 30 April 1918 (attested); 1977 (publicised)
- Region: Irish Sea, southwest of Scotland

The UB-85 monster, also infrequently referred to as the UB-85 atrocity, is an alleged sea monster said to have attacked German U-boat SM UB-85 in the closing months of the First World War off the coast of Scotland. The account, given by the submarine's commander Kapitänleutnant Günther Krech, has been widely dismissed as a hoax created to explain the malfunction and mechanical failure of the submarine which led to its capture by the British Flower-class sloop HMS Coreopsis.

== Eyewitness account and origin of myth ==
The initial account of the monster was suppossedly given by commander of the UB-85, Kapitänleutnant Günther Krech on 30 April 1918 during an interrogation by British forces proceeding the capture of the U-boat. The account was first publicised in sea monster enthusiast James B. Sweeney's Sea Monsters: A Collection of Eyewitness Accounts sixty-nine years later in 1977. Krech's account is quoted in the book;

"Two nights before," Krech reported, "My submarine was on the surface recharging batteries. The moon was up and I was very nervous. We could easily be seen by any enemy patrol boat. Without any kind of warning, a strange beast began to climb aboard. The great weight of the animal gave us a list to starboard. We were in danger of shipping water through an open hatch and sinking."

"This beast had large eyes set in a horny sort of skull. It had a small head but, with teeth that could be seen glistening in the moonlight. Every man on watch began firing a sidearm at the beast. It had a hold on the forward gun mount and would not turn loose. After a viscious struggle in which my boat was almost swamped, the beast dropped back into the sea."

..."That is why," The German skipper said, "you were able to catch us on the surface."

— Günther Krech, Sea Monsters: A Collection of Eyewitness Accounts (1977), pp. 68–69

The UB-85 was supposedly attacked by this monster in the Irish Sea off the coast of Stranraer, Scotland, on 28 April, where the U-boat was then discovered and attacked two days later by HMS Coreopsis – commanded by Lieutenant P. S. Peat, RNR. HMS Valorous, an accompanying patrol ship, picked up Krech, while a collection of other patrol ships collected the rest of the crew, all 34 of which surrendered without resistance. Historian, nautical achaeologist and vocal critic of the account, Innes McCartney states that the account had been widely retold since the 1920s, and the 2016 rediscovery of what has been assumed to be the wreck of the UB-85 (Note: The wreck may potentially have been the SM UB-82, another U-boat lost to the Irish Sea in the First World War. McCartney requested the wreck be examined for a shipyard stamp (identification numbers), though the lack of public interest in the wreck meant that direct observation via diving has yet to happen.) in the Irish Sea had brought attention back to the account.

All contemporary discussions of the monster almost exclusively reference this sole account, though some minor details are sometimes altered in retellings, such as the added detail that the monster may have directly attacked the mounted gun by biting it and damaging it, or that is had small eyes rather than large ones.

== Scepticism ==
Innes McCartney has been a vocal sceptic of Krech's account in much contemporary discussion of the monster and the circumstances that led to the mechanical failure of the UB-85. During the 2016 rediscovery of the assumed wreck of the U-boat by ScottishPower while undersea power cables were being laid in the Irish Sea, McCartney was interviewed by a variety of news publications and online maritime history sites regarding the nature of the ship's sinking, and the truth of Krech's claims. McCartney explained to The Guardian that the account had been spread and perpetuated by "credulous journalists" and that the story may have originated long after the capture of the UB-85.

Most notably, McCartney directly rejects Sweeney's 1977 account, stating instead that the story first appeared online around 2005, and that a monster had never been attested by any of the crew during any questioning by British patrol officers during the actual confrontation in the Irish Sea, instead having been created as an interesting story during the 1920s. In an interview with the BBC, McCartney proposed that the original myth in the 1920s was created by journalists and ex-Navy "talking late at night after having a nice time", insinuating drunkenness.

== Explanation for stranding ==
The exact truth behind the mechanical failure and stranding of the UB-85 remains uncertain, though McCartney maintains that it was likely caused by incompetence among the crew, which were inexperienced officers. McCartney attributes the sinking to "common mechanical failure" in Archaeology Magazine's coverage of the rediscovery of the wreck, and specifically that the U-boat may have took on water due to an open hatch when attempting to rapidly submerge to evade British patrol. If Krech's account is to be believed, he does mention an open hatch posing a seal leakage threat during the encounter in Sweeney's book. Alternatively, the U-boat may have simply taken on excess gunfire and not been able to submerge due to combat-related damages. McCartney also rejects the idea that the attack took place two nights prior to the U-boat's discovery by the Coreopsis, instead suggesting that the UB-85 was confronted while unprepared, and after attempting to submerge rapidly in a crash dive, it experienced a leak related to the hatch seal and had to re-emerge hastily to avoid sinking, stranding it. Peter Roper, director of ScottishPower, corroborates McCartney's "more straightforward" explanation, citing Krech's account as an "excuse" for inexperience and the capture of his vessel by Allied forces. In an interview with ABC Australia, McCartney directly cites the "50-years secrecy rule", a naval rule classifying the records and sinkings of U-boats for up to fifty years after they have occurred, for allowing the build-up of conspiracy theories and hoaxes related to ships such as the UB-85 in an absence of official records.
