= Skolopendra =

Sea monster legend in classical Greco-Roman folklore

The skolopendra (Σκολοπενδρα; Greek: "centipede") was a sea serpent or Cetus of the Mediterranean Sea in classical Greco-Roman belief.

== Attestations ==
The giant scolopendra is mentioned in poems attributed to the 2^{nd} Century B.C. poets Antipater of Sidon and Theodoridas of Syracuse. One of Antipater's epigrams tells of a man named Hermonax, who discovers the remains of a fifty-foot scolopendra in shallow water, and offers the carcass to the sea deity Ino as a gift. Theodoridas simply describes it as a thousand-limbed sea monster.

The scolopendra was most famously described, in a natural history context, by the Roman writer Aelian, in the surviving thirteenth book of his multi-volume work De Natura Animalium. Aelian gleaned much of his information on marine life from fishermen and sailors; such was the case with the scolopendra, and, after some "examining and investigating," Aelian declared himself convinced by the testimonies he received.

Now in the course of examining and investigating these subjects and what bears upon them, to the utmost limit, with all the zeal that I could command, I have ascertained that the scolopendra is a sea-monster, and of sea-monsters it is the biggest, and if cast up on the shore no one would have the courage to look at it. And those who are expert in marine matters say that they have seen them floating and that they extend the whole of their head above the sea, exposing hairs of immense length protruding from their nostrils, and that the tail is flat and resembles that of a crayfish. And at times the rest of their body is to be seen floating on the surface, and its bulk is comparable to a full-sized trireme. And they swim with numerous feet in line on either side as though they were rowing themselves (though the expression is somewhat harsh) with tholepins hung alongside. So those who have experience in these matters say that the surge responds with a gentle murmer, and their statement convinces me.

Aelian also describes the Skolopendra as being identical to a centipede, and that if any man touches it, he will feel the same pain as touching a nettle.

Oppian also wrote on the creature, calling it a reptile, saying that if anybody touches it, they will immediately get a "red-hot" itch, he says of it "for if it touch the bait, not a fish will come near that hook; with such a hateful venom does the Scolopendra infect it."

== Notes and references ==
Attribution: This article incorporates material derived from the "Scolopendra" article on the cryptidarchives wiki at Fandom (formerly Wikia) and is licensed under the Creative Commons Attribution-Share Alike 3.0 License (5 October 2026).
