= HMS Daedalus (1826) =

Frigate of the Royal Navy

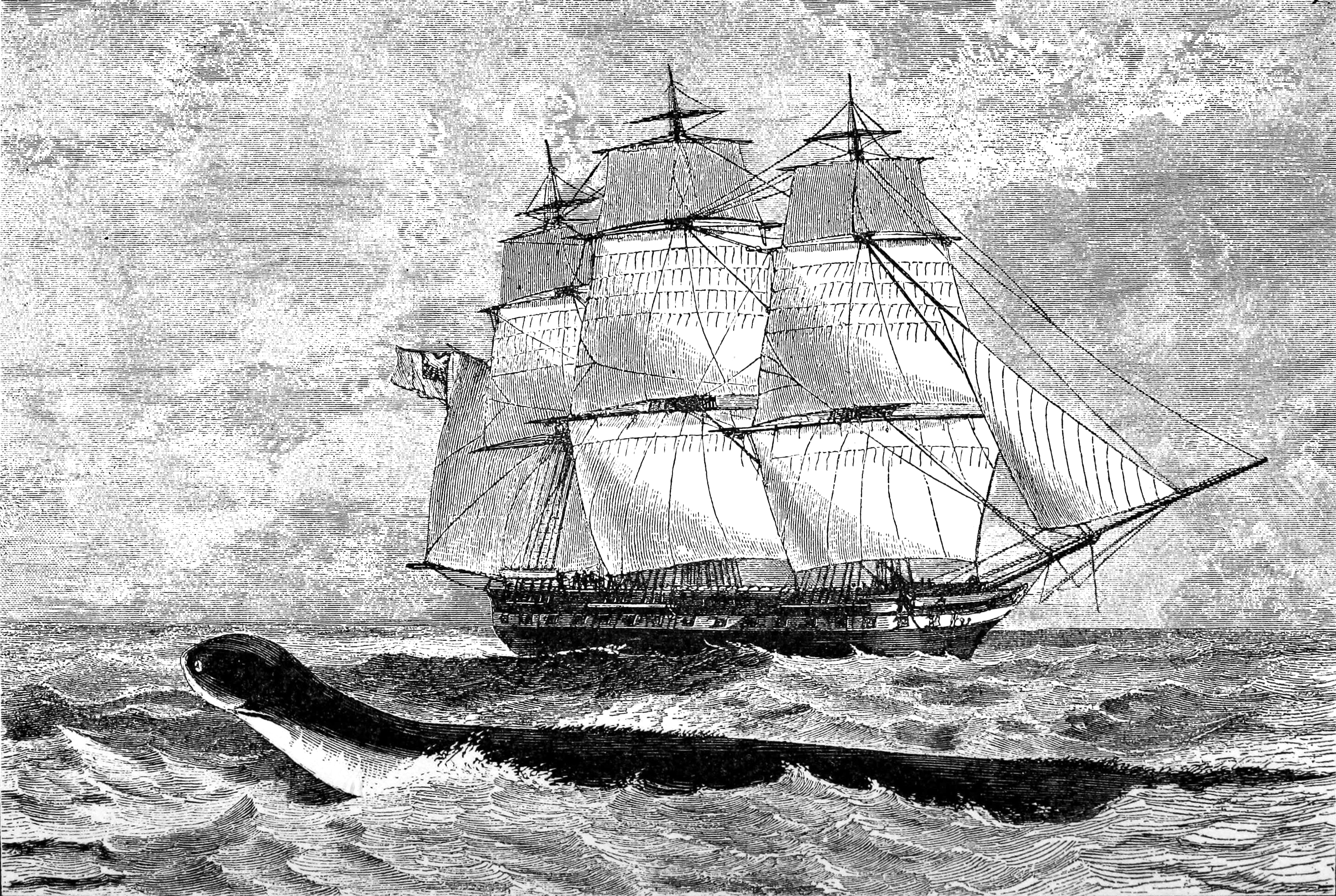
- The Daedalus sea serpent of 1848

History

United Kingdom
- Name: HMS Daedalus
- Ordered: 23 July 1817
- Builder: Sheerness Dockyard
- Laid down: November 1822
- Launched: 22 May 1826 (floated out)
- Fate: Sold 14 September 1911

General characteristics
- Class & type: Modified Leda-class frigate
- Tons burthen: 1082 bm
- Length: 150 ft 10.25 in (45.9804 m) (gundeck); 127 ft 4.5 in (38.824 m) (keel)
- Beam: 40 ft 3.5 in (12.281 m)
- Depth of hold: 12 ft 9 in (3.89 m)
- Sail plan: Full-rigged ship
- Complement: 300
- Armament: 46 guns (original); Upper deck: Twenty-eight 18-pounder guns; Forecastle: Two 9-pounder guns and two 32-pounder carronades; Quarter deck: Eight 9-pounder guns and six 32-pounder carronades

HMS Daedalus was a 19th-century warship of the Royal Navy. She is primarily remembered for a reported sea serpent sighting by her captain and crew in August 1848.

== History ==
The ship was launched as a fifth-rate frigate of 46 guns of the Modified Leda class in 1826, but never commissioned in that role, being roofed over fore and aft and then laid up in Ordinary (reserve). After spending 18 years laid up in reserve, she was raséed (cut down) at Woolwich Dockyard into a corvette, reduced to 19 guns in 1844.

In 1853, Daedalus was laid up at Plymouth Dockyard. Between March and June 1851 she was fitted out as a training ship, and transferred to the Royal Naval Reserve as a drill ship at Bristol. She was finally paid off from this role in September 1910, and sold in 1911 at Bristol to take to pieces.

== Sea serpent sighting ==
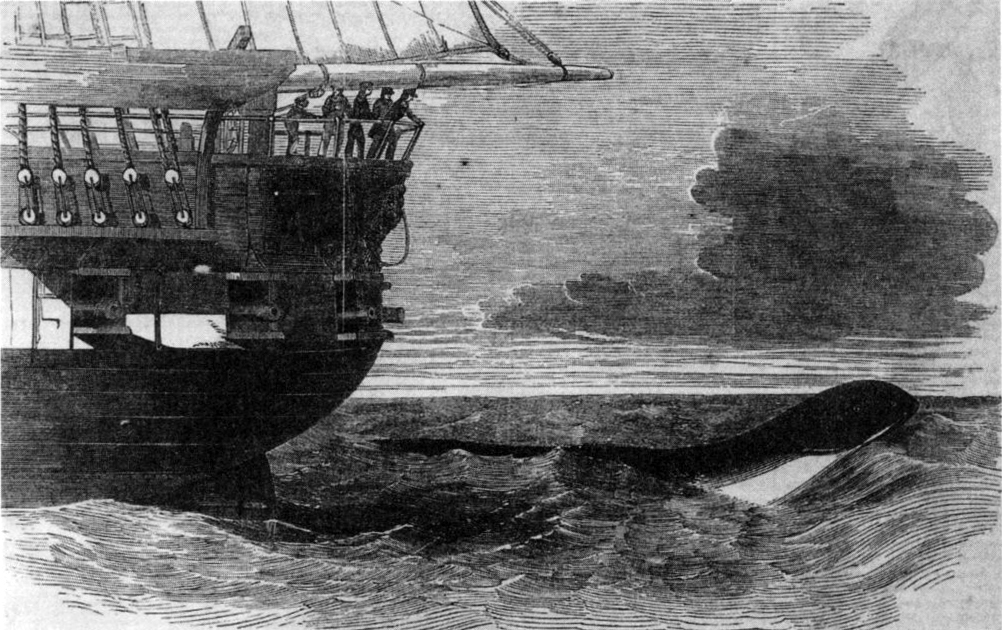
An original illustration of the reported sea serpent

On 6 August 1848, Captain M'Quhae of Daedalus and several of his officers and crew (en route to St Helena at the rate of eight miles per hour [7 kn; 13 km/h]) saw a sea serpent which was subsequently reported (and debated) in The Times. The vessel sighted what they named as an enormous serpent between the Cape of Good Hope and St Helena (reported by the captain as 24°44′S 9°22′E; off the coast of modern-day Namibia). The crew stated "the creature was twenty minutes in sight of the frigate, and passed under her quarter." The serpent's head "appeared to be about four feet [1.2 m] out of the water;" it "was about sixty feet [18 m]" in size, and observers estimated "there must have been under water a length of thirty or forty feet [9 or 12 m] more." The jaws of the serpent "were full of large, jagged teeth" and the "diameter of the exposed part of the body was about sixteen inches [40 cm]."

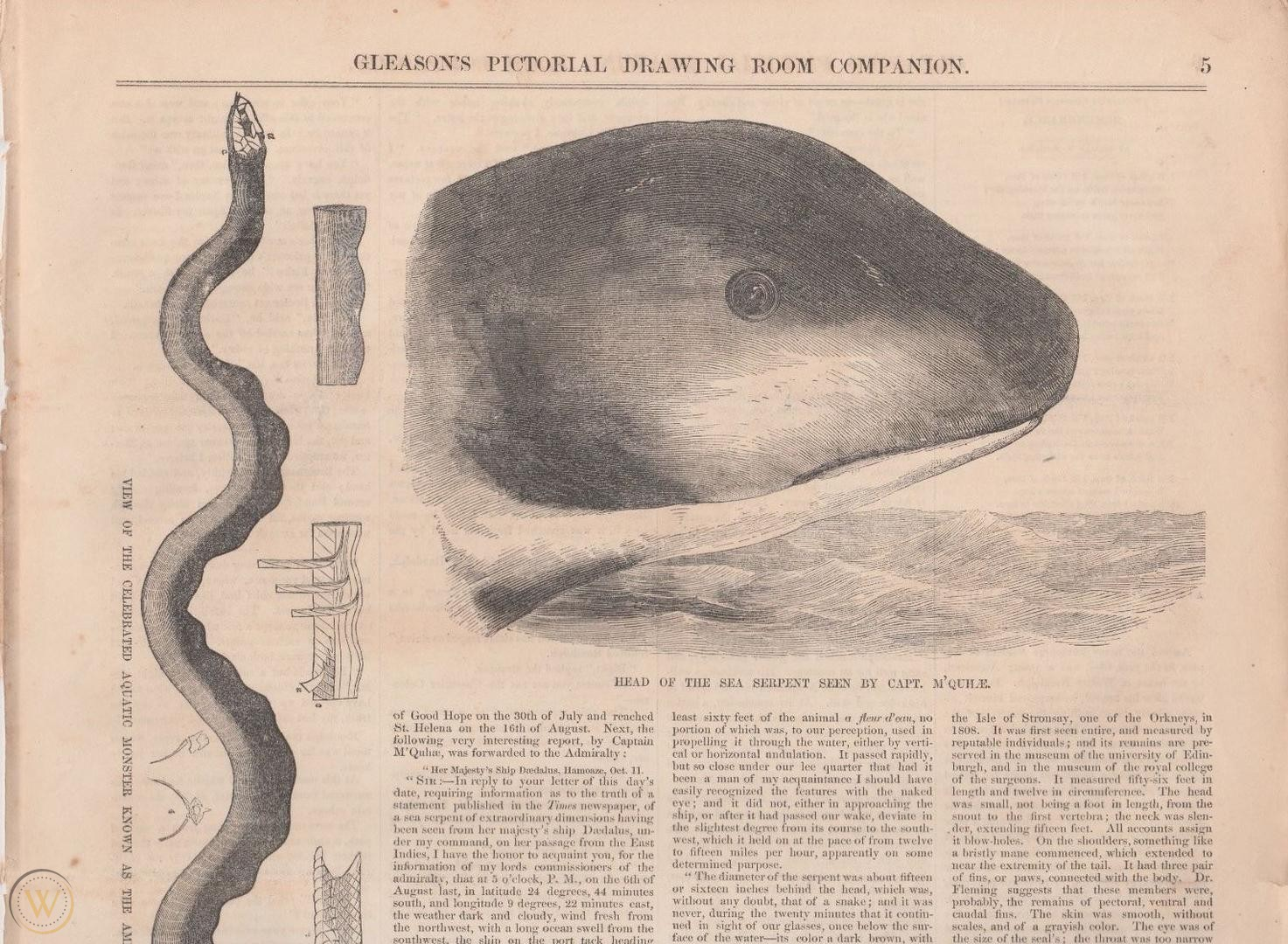
Illustration of the head, 1852

Captain M'Quhae also reported that the creature was "dark brown, with yellowish-white about the throat" and was moving "at the pace of from 12 to 15 miles per hour (10 to 13 kn; 19 to 24 km/h)." Captain M'Quhae also said "it passed rapidly, but so close under our lee quarter, that had it been a man of my acquaintance I should have easily have recognised his features with the naked eye;" besides, according to the captain, "it had no fins, but something like the mane of a horse, or rather a bunch of seaweed, washed about its back." M'Quhae stated the head of the creature "was, without any doubt, that of a snake."

In 2015, evolutionary biologist Gary J. Galbreath contended that what the crew of Daedalus saw was a sei whale.

In 2023, Karl Brandt suggested well-known sea serpent sightings, including that of Daedalus, could be explained by harpooned sperm whales held fast to their hunters’ overturned rowboats. The boats would accumulate debris at the surface which could stretch for hundreds of yards while appearing to be propelled through the water by unknown means.

== Sources ==
- "Big eels and little eels" in Eagle Annual 1968, London, Odhams Books, 1967, p. 118.
- Eyers, Jonathan. Don't Shoot the Albatross!: Nautical Myths and Superstitions, London, A&C Black, 2011, p. 87. ISBN 978-1-4081-3131-2.
- Winfield, Rif; Lyon, David. The Sail and Steam Navy List: All the Ships of the Royal Navy 1815–1889. London, Chatham, 2004. ISBN 1-86176-032-9.
