= Cirein-cròin =

Sea monster from Scottish folklore

Cirein-cròin, Ceirean, or cionarain-crò was a large sea monster in Scottish Gaelic folklore. An old saying claims that it was so large that it fed on seven whales. Local folklore holds that this massive creature could disguise itself as a small silvery fish when fishermen came into contact with it. Other accounts state the reason for the disguise was to attract its next meal; when a fisherman would catch it in its piscatorial form, the Cirein-cròin would shed its disguise once aboard and consume its would-be captor.

A saying, as recorded by Alexander Robert Forbes, goes:

Gaelic	Translation	Notes
Seachd sgadain, sath bradain;	Seven herrings, a salmon's fill;	
Seachd bradain, sath ròin;	Seven salmon, a seal's fill;	
Seachd ròin, sath mial-mòr-mara	Seven seals, a large whale's fill	(Mial here is archaic; killer whales eat seals, but baleen whales do not.)
Seachd mial, sath Cirein-cròin	Seven whales, a cirein-cròin's fill	

A second version retains the first two parts, but expands and ranks the "Cionarain-cro" second to the "great sea animal". In Carmina Gadelica, Alexander Carmichael attributed this version to a cottar named Kenneth Morrison in Trithion on the Isle of Skye, from whom it was recorded in 1860.

Gaelic	Translation (Carmichael)	Notes
Seachd sgadain, sath bradain;	Seven herrings, feast of a salmon;	
Seachd bradain, sath ròin;	Seven salmon, feast of a seal;	
Seachd ròin, sath muice-mara bheag;	Seven seals, feast of a little sow of the ocean;	("Sow" and "sow of the sea" are common terms for a whale.)
Seachd muice-mara bheag, sath muice-mara-mhor;	Seven little sows of the ocean, feast of a large sow of the ocean;	
Seachd muice-mara-mhor, sath cionarain-cro;	Seven large sows of the ocean, feast of a "cionarain-cro";	(Carmichael tentatively identified the "cionarain-cro" with the "kracken".) (Note: Carmichael uses the nonstandard spelling "kracken" instead of "kraken".)
Seachd cionarain-cro, sath mial-mor-a-chuain;	Seven cionarain-cro, feast of a great beast of the ocean.	(Carmichael tentatively translated "mial-mor-a-chuain" as "great sperm whale".)

Forbes lists the creature as a large variation of sea serpent. He also proposes it as a dinosaur: (Note: It is unclear whether Forbes was implying that the legends were based on fossils or whether he was literally suggesting the implausible post-Mesozoic survival of a lineage of dinosaurs.)

It is not known what this monster animal was, though it may well have been one of these "Giant fish-destroyers," so ably, inler alia, described by Dr Carmichael M'Intosh, which waged war in sea and on land against all and sundry as well as against each other, viz., the gigantic Deinosaurs [sic], some of which, notably the Atlantosaurus, reached to one hundred feet in length with a height of thirty feet, and proportionately awful of aspect.

== See also ==
- Jörmungandr – Sea serpent in Norse mythology
- Stoor worm – Sea serpent of Orcadian folklore
- Sea serpent – Type of sea monster described in religion, mythology, and folklore

== Bibliography ==
- Robert Forbes, Alexander (1905). Gaelic names of beasts (mammalia), birds, fishes, insects, reptiles, etc. Edinburgh Oliver and Boyd. p. 226, 384-385.
- (Cirein-cròin, ceirean)
