= List of shipwrecks in November 1885 =

The list of shipwrecks in November 1885 includes ships sunk, foundered, grounded, or otherwise lost during November 1885.

== 1 November ==
List of shipwrecks: 1 November 1885
Ship	State	Description
Frank Moffatt	United States	The steamship's boiler exploded at Sombra, Ontario, Canada and she was wrecked, sinking in the Saint Clair River. Five crew died. Her engine was salvaged on 1 December and the wreck was blown up with dynamite. Wreckage removed by Canadian Government in 1888.
Lady Elizabeth	United Kingdom	The smack collided with the smack Premier (United Kingdom) and sank in the North Sea 90 nautical miles (170 km) east of Spurn Head, Yorkshire with the loss of two of her five crew. Survivors were rescued by Premier.
Omeilew	Sweden	The brig was driven ashore and wrecked 2 nautical miles (3.7 km) south of Withernsea, Yorkshire, United Kingdom. Her crew were rescued.
Unnamed	United States	A steam dredger, under tow of C. C. Wait (United States) suffered a boiler explosion and sank in Long Island Sound with the loss of all six crew. She was being towed from New York to Providence, Rhode Island.

== 2 November ==
List of shipwrecks: 2 November 1885
Ship	State	Description
Alert	United Kingdom	The tug sank off Barry Island, Glamorgan without loss of life.
Belle	United States	The schooner was wrecked off Mount Desert, Maine. Her crew were rescued.

== 3 November ==
List of shipwrecks: 3 November 1885
Ship	State	Description
Blackhead	United Kingdom	The steamship ran aground on the Hollywood Bank, in the Belfast Lough. She was on a voyage from Belfast, County Antrim to Dublin. She was refloated the next day with the assistance of two tugs and resumed her voyage.
Lady of the Lake	United Kingdom	The ship struck a sunken wreck off Penzance, Cornwall and developed a severe leak. She was beached at Falmouth, Cornwall.

== 4 November ==
List of shipwrecks: 4 November 1885
Ship	State	Description
Fredericke	Norway	The brig ran aground at Castle Pill, Pembrokeshire, United Kingdom whilst avoiding a collision with another vessel and was severely damaged. She was on a voyage from Neder Kalix, Sweden to Milford Haven, Pembrokeshire. She was refloated on 8 November.
Helen Finlayson	United Kingdom	The ship departed from Grimsby, Lincolnshire for Aspinwall, United States of Colombia. No further trace, reported overdue.
Titania	United Kingdom	The steamship was driven ashore on Anticosti Island, Quebec, Canada. She was on a voyage from Glasgow, Renfrewshire to Montreal, Quebec. She was refloated in August 1886.
Venetienne	United Kingdom	The steamship foundered off the Longships, Cornwall. Her crew were rescued by Village Belle (United Kingdom). Venetienne was on a voyage from Cardiff, Glamorgan to Saint-Malo, Ille-et-Vilaine, France.

== 5 November ==
List of shipwrecks: 5 November 1885
Ship	State	Description
Eugenie	Denmark	The ship was damaged by an onboard explosion at Seaham, County Durham, United Kingdom. Two of her cre3w were severely wounded.

== 6 November ==
List of shipwrecks: 6 November 1885
Ship	State	Description
Mountain Girl	United States	The steamship collided with the steamship James W. Gaff (United States) and sank in the Ohio River 2 1/2 miles (4.0 km) upstream of Rising Sun, Indiana. Two passengers died.
Mary and Catherine	United States	The pilot boat was run into and sunk by steamship Haverton (United Kingdom) with the loss of one life. Nine survivors were rescued by another pilot boat.

== 7 November ==
List of shipwrecks: 7 November 1885
Ship	State	Description
Algoma	Canada	The wreck of Algoma The steamship was wrecked in Lake Superior off Isle Royale, Michigan, United States with the loss of 46 lives. Her machinery was removed and the wreck was dispersed by explosives in July 1886.
Pioneer	United Kingdom	The steamship was driven ashore on the Seaton Sea Rocks, near Blyth, Northumberland.

== 8 November ==
List of shipwrecks: 8 November 1885
Ship	State	Description
Brooklyn	United Kingdom	The steamship was wrecked on Anticosti Island, Quebec, Canada with no loss of life.
Lady Elizabeth	United Kingdom	The ship collided with the smack Premier (United Kingdom and sank with the loss of two of the five people on board. Survivors were rescued by Premier.

== 9 November ==
List of shipwrecks: 9 November 1885
Ship	State	Description
Crusader	United Kingdom	The fishing trawler collided with the steasmship Strathearn (United Kingdom) and sank in the River Liffey.
Sixty-four	United Kingdom	The Mersey Flat collided with the mud hopper Beta (United Kingdom) and sank at Liverpool, Lancashire.

== 10 November ==
List of shipwrecks: 10 November 1885
Ship	State	Description
Asteroid	United Kingdom	The schooner ran aground on the Gravel Bank, east of Yarmouth, Isle of Wight. She was on a voyage from Poole, Dorset to Southampton, Hampshire. She was refloated the next day and resumed her voyage.
Pathfinder	Canada	The ship struck rocks at Malin, County Donegal, United Kingdom and was wrecked. She was on a voyage from Dundalk, County Louth, United Kingdom to Sydney, Nova Scotia.

== 11 November ==
List of shipwrecks: 11 November 1885
Ship	State	Description
Indus	United Kingdom	The steamship ran aground on the Mulletivoe Shoal, 60 nautical miles (110 km) north of Trincomalee, Ceylon and was wrecked. All on board were rescued by HMS Ranger (Royal Navy). Indus was on a voyage from Colombo, Ceylon to Suez, Khedivate of Egypt.

== 12 November ==
List of shipwrecks: 12 November 1885
Ship	State	Description
Berteaux	United Kingdom	The ship was destroyed by fire at "Burose Island".
Mary Sinclair	United Kingdom	The schooner was run down by the steamship Stratheden (United Kingdom) and sank in the Peel Channel. Mary Sinclair was on a voyage from Fowey, Cornwall to Lancaster, Lancashire .
Pietro	Italy	The barque foundered in the Atlantic Ocean. She was on a voyage from Marseille, Bouches-du-Rhône, France to Buenos Aires, Argentina.

== 13 November ==
List of shipwrecks: 13 November 1885
Ship	State	Description
Brothers	United Kingdom	The tug sank at Greenock, Renfrewshire.
Corton Lightship	Trinity House	The lightship was run into by the schooner Alexander Nichol (United Kingdom) ane was severely damaged. She was towed in to Great Yarmouth, Norfolk for repairs.

== 14 November ==
List of shipwrecks: 14 November 1885
Ship	State	Description
Enterprise	United Kingdom	The ketch was driven ashore at Margate, Kent.

== 15 November ==
List of shipwrecks: 15 November 1885
Ship	State	Description
Excelsior	United Kingdom	The ship was sighted in the Atlantic Ocean whilst on a voyage from Falmouth, Cornwall to Saint John, New Brunswick, Canada. No further trace, reported missing.
Nereide	United Kingdom	The brigantine collided with the barque Southerfield (United States) and sank in the English Channel off the Royal Sovereign Lightship ( Trinity House) with the loss of her captain. Ten survivors were rescued by Southerfield. Nereide was on a voyage from Blyth, Northumberland to "Colón, Chile".
Tally Abbey	United Kingdom	The steamship struck the pier at Bilbao, Spain and ran aground. She was refloated on 20 November.

== 16 November ==
List of shipwrecks: 16 November 1885
Ship	State	Description
Italy	United Kingdom	The ship was wrecked in the Bunker Group, Queensland. Her crew were rescued.

== 18 November ==
List of shipwrecks: 18 November 1885
Ship	State	Description
Malta	United Kingdom	The ship was wrecked near Sandy Hook, New Jersey, United States with the loss of one of the 24 people on board.
Moringen	Norway	The brig was abandoned in the North Sea. She was on a voyage from Blyth, Northumberland, United Kingdom to Trondheim. She was subsequently taken in to Grimsby, Lincolnshire, United Kingdom by a smack and a tug.

== 19 November ==
List of shipwrecks: 19 November 1885
Ship	State	Description
Bessie	United Kingdom	The fishing smack collided with the snow Daring (United Kingdom) and sank off Seaford, Sussex. Her crew were rescued.
Guadaloupe	United States	The ship was wrecked at Barnegat, New Jersey. Her crew were not rescued for 42 days.
Jesmond	Norway	The barque was abandoned in the Atlantic Ocean in a waterlogged condition. Her crew were rescued by the steamship Moruca (United Kingdom). Jesmond was on a voyage from Richibucto, New Brunswick, Canada to Glasgow, Renfrewshire, United Kingdom.
Nina	United Kingdom	The Mersey Flat collided with the tug Pathfinder (United Kingdom) and sank in the River Mersey at Liverpool, Lancashire. Her crew were rescued.

== 20 November ==
List of shipwrecks: 20 November 1885
Ship	State	Description
Lydia	Canada	The ship broke from her moorings at Charlton, Kent and was severely damaged. Caused by the wake from the steamship Britannia (United Kingdom).

== 21 November ==
List of shipwrecks: 21 November 1885
Ship	State	Description
Atlantic	United States	The steamship burned and sank in the Ohio River near Neville, Ohio. Her fireman died.
Castor	United Kingdom	The tank barge was run into by the steamship Kronus (United Kingdom) and sank in the River Thames at Greenwich, Kent.
Iberian	United Kingdom	The cargo ship ran aground and was wrecked on the coast of County Cork. She had broken up by 28 November.

== 22 November ==
List of shipwrecks: 22 November 1885
Ship	State	Description
Mary	United States	The sloop dragged her anchors during a gale and was wrecked at Point Retreat (58°24′45″N 134°57′15″W), District of Alaska. Her three crew survived.

== 23 November ==
List of shipwrecks: 23 November 1885
Ship	State	Description
Cornelius Grinnell	United States	The barge, under tow by the tug America (United States), was cut loose in a storm 5 nautical miles (9.3 km; 5.8 mi) below Highland Light off Cape Cod, Massachusetts. She and her three crew were assumed to be lost.
Triumph	United Kingdom	The ketch collided with the steamship Renown (United Kingdom and sank off Higham, Kent.

== 24 November ==
List of shipwrecks: 24 November 1885
Ship	State	Description
Azalea	United Kingdom	The barge was run into by the steamship Kelloe (United Kingdom) and sank at Deptford, Kent.
Earl of Dufferin	United Kingdom	The steamship was wrecked off Anticosti Island, Quebec, Canada while salvaging the cargo of Brooklyn (United Kingdom). Her crew were rescued.
Ennismore	United Kingdom	The steamship was driven ashore and wrecked at Peterhead, Aberdeenshire. She was on a voyage from Aberdeen to Peterhead.
Ida Marshall	United Kingdom	The steamship collided with the steamship Navigation (United Kingdom) and sank in the English Channel 14 nautical miles (26 km) west of Dungeness, Kent. Her seventeen crew were rescued by Navigation. Ida Marshall was on a voyage from London to Cardiff, Glamorgan.
Unnamed	United Kingdom	A fishing boat was run down and sunk by the paddle steamer Argyll (United Kingdom) at Millport, Cumbrae. Her crew were rescued by Argyll.

== 25 November ==
List of shipwrecks: 25 November 1885
Ship	State	Description
Aurora	United Kingdom	The steamship ran aground at West Hartlepool, County Durham. She was refloated and resumed her voyage, but sprang a leak and foundered in the North Sea. Her 21 crew and two stowaways took to three boats, two of which capsized with the loss of three lives.
eLouisa	Denmark	The barque ran aground on the Haisborough Sands, in the North Sea off the coast of Norfolk, United Kingdom. She was on a voyage from Sundsvall, Sweden to Bordeaux, Gironde, France. She floated off and was taken in tow by the steamship Chicago (United States), but the tow rope broke and she was abandoned. Her crew were rescued by Chicago. Louisa was subsequently discovered by fishermen and beached at Sea Palling, Norfolk, where she became a wreck.
Mellona	United Kingdom	The brigantine collided with the steamship Stockton (United Kingdom) and sank.

== 26 November ==
List of shipwrecks: 26 November 1885
Ship	State	Description
Emma Graham	United States	The steamship sank at Ripley Landing on the Ohio River downstream of Parkersburg, West Virginia. Her fireman died.
Familiens Haab	Denmark	The steamship was driven ashore in Montrose Bay. Her crew were rescued by the Montrose Lifeboat. She was on a voyage from Fredrikshald to Leven, Fife, United Kingdom.
Inverdrurie	United Kingdom	The ship ran aground off the Tongue Lightship ( Trinity House). She was refloated and put back to Gravesend, Kent.
Penpol	United Kingdom	The schooner was driven ashore and wrecked at Trefadoc Point, Anglesey. Her crew were rescued.

== 27 November ==
List of shipwrecks: 27 November 1885
Ship	State	Description
Allan	United Kingdom	The smack broke from her moorings at Whitstable, Kent and drifted out to sea.
Cuba	United Kingdom	The barque ran aground in the River Ouse at Whitgift, Yorkshire. She was on a voyage from Goole, Yorkshire to Barbados. She was refloated and resumed her voyage.
Greenwood	United Kingdom	The steamship ran aground in the River Ouse at Whitgift. She was on a voyage from Riga, Russia to Goole. She was refloated and resumed her voyage.
Ralph Creyke	United Kingdom	The ship ran aground in the River Ouse at Swinefleet, Yorkshire. She was on a voyage from Goole to Antwerp, Belgium. She was refloated and resumed her voyage.
St. Elmo	United Kingdom	The full-rigged ship collided with the steamship Generaal Pel (Netherlands) and sank in the Timor Strait. All on board were rescued. St. Elmo was on a voyage from Cardiff, Glamorgan to Manila, Spanish East Indies.

== 28 November ==
List of shipwrecks: 28 November 1885
Ship	State	Description
Annie Vernon	United Kingdom	The steamship foundered off St. Ives, Cornwall. Her twelve crew survived.

== 29 November ==
List of shipwrecks: 29 November 1885
Ship	State	Description
Acorn	United Kingdom	The smack was driven ashore near Holywood, County Down.
Newburn	United Kingdom	The steamship was run into by the steamship Glendale (United Kingdom) and sank in the River Thames at Rotherhithe, Surrey.
Sapphire	Sweden	The schooner was abandoned in the North Sea 140 nautical miles (260 km) off Domesnes, Norway. Her crew were rescued by the smack Antonia (United Kingdom). Sapphire was on a voyage from Hull, Yorkshire, United Kingdom to "Sunderberg".

== 30 November ==
List of shipwrecks: 30 November 1885
Ship	State	Description
Alcester	United Kingdom	The steamship ran aground off Cape Helles, Ottoman Empire. She was refloated on 3 December.
Friedchen	Germany	The barque was abandoned in the Atlantic Ocean (49°00′N 9°30′W). Her crew were rescued by the barque Ina (Norway). Friedchen was on a voyage from Newport, Monmouthshire, United Kingdom to Buenos Aires, Argentina.
Stainsacre	United Kingdom	The steamship was run into by the steamship Harvest (United Kingdom) and sank at Newcastle upon Tyne, Northumberland. Her crew were rescued. Stainsacre was on a voyage from the River Tyne to Copenhagen, Denmark.

== Unknown date ==
List of shipwrecks: Unknown date in November 1885
Ship	State	Description
Ackworth	United Kingdom	The steamship struck the Pearl Rock, off Gibraltar. She was a total loss.
Anduiza	Spain	The steamship was wrecked in the Raz de Sein.
Angiolette Bozzo	Italy	The barque ran aground off Deal, Kent, United Kingdom. She was on a voyage from Baltimore, Maryland, United States to King's Lynn, Norfolk, United Kingdom. She was refloated and found to be leaky.
Aquilar	Norway	The barque foundered north of "Kosterskar", Sweden. Some of her crew were rescued, the rest were reported missing. She was on a voyage from Cette, Hérault to Dram.
Aurora	United Kingdom	The steamship foundered in the North Sea off West Hartlepool, County Durham with the loss of four of her 26 crew.
Baltic	United Kingdom	The schooner was driven ashore at Anholt, Denmark.
Bedlington	United Kingdom	The steamship ran aground at Scalanova, Ottoman Empire. She was on a voyage from Samos, Greece to Bordeaux, Gironde, France.
B. M. Width	Norway	The barque was lost at Santa Catarina. Her crew were rescued.
Cabo Trafalgar	Spain	The steamship ran ashore on "Plax Island".
Carmona	United Kingdom	The steamship ran aground in the Mississippi River at New Orleans, Louisiana, United States. She was refloated and taken in to New Orleans.
Cazique	United Kingdom	The brigantine was wrecked at Macao. She was on a voyage from Macau to Rio de Janeiro, Brazil.
Cervin, and Victoria	United Kingdom; Sweden	The steamships collided in the Mediterranean Sea and were both severely damaged. They both put in to Malta. Cervin was on a voyage from Cardiff, Glamorgan to Aden, Aden Settlement. Victoria was on a voyage from Batavia, Netherlands East Indies to Sweden.
Comet	United Kingdom	The steamship was driven ashore in Laggan Bay, Wigtownshire. Her crew were rescued.
Delphin	Russia	The barque ran aground on the Cork Sand, in the North Sea off the coast of Essex, United Kingdom. She was refloated with the assistance of the tugs Harwich and Robert Owen (both United Kingdom).
Edmondsley	United Kingdom	The steamship put in to Brunswick, Georgia, United States on fire. She was on a voyage from Galveston, Texas, United States to Liverpool, Lancashire. The fire was extinguished.
Elene	Denmark	The barque collided with another vessel and sank in the North Sea. Her crew were rescued.
Endeavour	United Kingdom	The steamship ran aground on the Maplin Sand, in the North Sea off the coast of Essex.
Eugenie	United Kingdom	The ship was reported to have driven ashore on the west coast of the Isle of Skye. She was on a voyage from Inverness to Sunderland, County Durham. She was refloated and completed her voyage, arriving at Sunderland on 19 November.
Express	Norway	The brig was abandoned in the North Sea on or before 28 November. She subsequently came ashore and was wrecked at Strathy, Sutherland, United Kingdom.
Firefly	United Kingdom	The steamship was driven ashore on Saint Kitts.
Fitzjames	United Kingdom	The steamship collided with the tug Falcon (United Kingdom) and ran aground at Cardiff.
Foyle, and Moss Brow	United Kingdom	The steamships collided at Cardiff and were both severely damaged. Moss Brow was beached.
Franceschino	Italy	The barque was abandoned in the Atlantic Ocean. Her crew were rescued by the barque W. S. Carmelo (Italy). Franceschino was on a voyage from Cardiff to Buenos Aires, Argentina.
Fraternitas	Denmark	The ship ran aground and was wrecked at Thurso, Caithness, United Kingdom. She was on a voyage from Gävle, Sweden to Thurso.
Frederikke Louise	Denmark	The barque was driven ashore. She was on a voyage from Ghent, East Flanders, Belgium to Havre de Grâce, Seine-Inférieure, France. She was refloated and taken in to Vlissingen, Zeeland, Netherlands.
Frederiksteen	Norway	The brig ran aground in the River Thames at Mucking, Essex.
Fredrik Strang	Norway	The full-rigged ship was driven ashore at Krawang, Netherlands East Indies. She was refloated and placed under repair.
Friede	Flag unknown	The ship was driven ashore at Margate, Kent, United Kingdom. She was refloated and put back to Gravesend, Kent in a severely leaky condition.
Gerhard	Germany	The brigantine was wrecked at Macau. She was on a voyage from Macau to Pernambuco, Brazil.
Gilsland	United Kingdom	The barque caught fire at East London, Cape Colony.
Gol	France	The barque sprang a leak and was beached at Kalle, Ceylon, where she became a wreck. She was on a voyage from Coconada, India to Réunion.
Guiding Star	United Kingdom	The Mersey Flat ran aground on the East Hoyle Bank, in Liverpool Bay. She was later refloated.
Guillermo	Flag unknown	The steamship sank in the River Mersey off New Brighton, Cheshire, United Kingdom.
Henny	Norway	The barque was abandoned in the North Sea 50 nautical miles (93 km) off Berwick upon Tweed, Northumberland, United Kingdom. Her ten crew took to a boat; they were rescued by the steam trawler Challenger (United Kingdom). Henny was on a voyage from Calais, France to Mandal, Norway.
Hermann	Germany	The brig was driven ashore at Cap Gris-Nez, Pas-de-Calais, France.
Hudson	United Kingdom	The ship was driven ashore near Timaru, New Zealand. She was on a voyage from London to Lyttelton, New Zealand. She was refloated on 27 November.
Ingeborg	Sweden	The schooner ran aground on Sjallands Reef, in the Baltic Sea. She was on a voyage form Nakskov, Denmark to Stockholm. She was refloated with the assistance of a steamship and taken in to Copenhagen, Denmark.
Italia	Portugal	The steamship ran aground on the Cabadello. She was refloated and beached in the Douro. She was later refloated and taken in to Porto.
Jabez	United Kingdom	The Thames barge sank in the River Thames downstream of Gravesend. She was on a voyage from London to Rochester, Kent.
Johann	Germany	The steamship was wrecked at Lagos, Lagos Colony.
John and Margaret	United Kingdom	The schooner was abandoned in the North Sea. Her crew were rescued by the steamship Westwood (United Kingdom). John and Margaret was on a voyage from Ipswich, Suffolk to Seaham, County Durham. She came ashore at Lemvig, Denmark in early December.
Kerrig	United Kingdom	The barque foundered during a gale. Ten of her crew were rescued by the steam trawler Challenger (United Kingdom).
Lawrentia	Russia	The brig was driven ashore on Skagen, Denmark. She was on a voyage from Ghent to Ventava, Courland Governorate.
Lina	Germany	The galiot was driven ashore. She was on a voyage from Riga, Russia to Uddevalla, Sweden. She was refloated and taken in to Gothenburg, Sweden in a leaky condition.
Lucretia	United Kingdom	The steamship was abandoned in the North Sea. Her crew were rescued by a Dutch fishing smack. She was on a voyage from Gothenburg, Sweden to Civita Vecchia, Italy.
Ludwig Holberg	Norway	The steamship was driven ashore on the coast of the Ottoman Empire.
Madeleine	United Kingdom	The steamship was driven ashore at "Gilberghoved", Denmark. She was on a voyage from Newcastle upon Tyne, Northumberland to Swinemümde, Germany.
Maggie O''Brien	United Kingdom	The steamship was driven ashore and severely damaged at Huelva, Spain. She was on a voyage from Darien, Georgia, United States to Huelva. She was refloated on 27 November and taken in to Huelva in a waterlogged condition. She was condemned.
Malta	Flag unknown	The ship was driven ashore at Red Bank, New Jersey, United States. She was on a voyage form Antwerp, Belgium to New York, United States.
Marianne Briggs	United Kingdom	The steamship ran aground in the River Ouse. She was on a voyage from Hamburg, Germany to Goole, Yorkshire. She was refloated on 13 November with the assistance of a tug and resumed her voyage.
Marie Antoinette	Netherlands	The barque was driven ashore at Otranto, Italy after 22 November. She was on a voyage from Fiume, Austria-Hungary to Philadelphia, Pennsylvania, United States. She was refloated and towed in to Brindisi, Italy.
Marinin	United Kingdom	The ship ran aground off Folkestone, Kent. She was refloated and towed in to Gravesend in a leaky condition.
Marmora	United Kingdom	The steamship ran aground at Huelva, Spain.
Mary Lohden, and Walkyre	United Kingdom; Germany	The steamships collided in the Kattegat. Mary Lohden was beached on Anholt. Walkyre sank.
Max Fischer	Germany	The barque collided with the steamship Denham (United Kingdom) and sank off Anholt. Her crew were rescued by Denham. Max Fischer was on a voyage from Bristol, Gloucestershire, United Kingdom to Copenhagen.
Medora	Norway	The barque ran aground on the Yarmouth Bank. She was on a voyage from Ystad, Sweden to London. She was later refloated and towed in to Gravesend by the tugs Triumph and Victoria (both United Kingdom).
Mentmore	United Kingdom	The steamship ran aground on the Burbo Bank, in Liverpool Bay. She was on a voyage from Liverpool to Baltimore, Maryland, United States. She was refloated on 23 November.
Nederland Oranje	Netherlands	The steamship ran aground on the Saujack Spit, in Ottoman Empire waters.
Njord	Norway	The barque was driven ashore in Wick Bay. Her eight crew were rescued by the Wick Lifeboat. She was on a voyage from Middlesbrough, Yorkshire to Rosario, Brazil.
Opah	United Kingdom	The steamship ran aground off Texel, North Holland, Netherlands. She was on a voyage from Kotka, Grand Duchy of Finland to Amsterdam, North Holland. She was refloated and taken in to IJmuiden, North Holland in a leaky condition.
Pat	United Kingdom	The schooner was driven ashore during a gale at Cunningsburgh, Shetland Islands.
Peggy	United Kingdom	The schoonrer was run into by the steamship Balgownie (United Kingdom) and sank in the River Thames at Lower Hope, Kent. Her crew were rescued.
Pet	United Kingdom	The schooner was driven ashore and wrecked at Cunningsburgh, Shetland Islands. Her crew were rescued.
Pride	United Kingdom	The schooner was driven ashore at South Benfleet, Essex. She was on a voyage from London to Dunbar, Lothian.
Red Cross	United Kingdom	The ship was wrecked on the coast of the Newfoundland Colony. She was on a voyage from Quebec City, Canada to the Clyde.
Rescue	United Kingdom	The tug was driven ashore at Thames Haven, Essex.
Rowan	United Kingdom	The steamship caught fire at Lisbon, Portugal and was scuttled.
Saxon	United Kingdom	The steamship was driven ashore and damaged at Stralsund, Germany. She was on a voyage from London to Stettin, Germany. She was refloated with assistance.
Servantes	France	The steamship ran aground in the River Ouse. She was on a voyage from Goole to Calais. She was refloated with the assistance of a tug on 13 November and resumed her voyage.
Sceptre	United Kingdom	The steamship ran aground in Almería Bay.
Solide	Norway	The brig was abandoned in the North Sea. Her crew survived.
Star of Hope	United Kingdom	The schooner ran aground at Wexford. She was on a voyage from Newport, Monmouthshire to Wexford.
St. Chamond	France	The ship was wrecked at Lesconil, Finistère.
Triumph	United Kingdom	The schooner was run into by a steamship and sank off Gravesend.
Underwriter	United Kingdom	The ship was destroyed by fire at Bermuda.
Viola	Germany	The steamship was driven ashore at Kullen, Sweden. She was on a voyage from Hamburg to Stockholm. She was refloated and taken in to a port for repairs, being leaky.
Wanderer	Germany	The ship was wrecked at Agde, Hérault. Her crew were rescued.
Welcombe	United Kingdom	The steamship was driven ashore and wrecked at Point Stalwart, Cape Colony. All on board were rescued.
Unnamed	Royal Navy	A steam tender to HMS Penelope ran ashore at Whitstable, Kent.
