= Brockhaus =

Brockhaus may refer to:

- Friedrich Arnold Brockhaus (1772–1823), German encyclopedia publisher and editor
  - F.A. Brockhaus AG, his publishing firm
  - Brockhaus Enzyklopädie, an encyclopedia published by the firm
  - 27765 Brockhaus, an asteroid named for him
- Hermann Brockhaus (1806–1877), German orientalist, son of Friedrich

== See also ==
- Brockhaus and Efron Encyclopedic Dictionary, a Russian-language encyclopedia
