= SS Iberian (1900) =

British cargo steamship sunk in the First World War

History

United Kingdom
- Name: Iberian
- Namesake: demonym for Iberia
- Owner: F Leyland & Co
- Port of registry: Liverpool
- Builder: Sir James Laing & Sons, Sunderland
- Yard number: 576
- Launched: 21 March 1900
- Completed: June 1900
- Identification: UK official number 113367; code letters RQNM; by 1914: call sign MHA
- Fate: Sunk by torpedo, 1915

General characteristics
- Type: cargo ship
- Tonnage: 5,223 GRT, 3,347 NRT
- Length: 437.0 ft (133.2 m)
- Beam: 48.8 ft (14.9 m)
- Depth: 29.9 ft (9.1 m)
- Decks: 3
- Installed power: 470 NHP
- Propulsion: 1 × triple-expansion engine; 1 × screw
- Speed: 12 knots (22 km/h)
- Crew: 67

SS Iberian was a British cargo steamship that was built in England in 1900 and sunk by a U-boat in 1915. Throughout her career she was owned and operated by Frederick Leyland & Co of Liverpool.

This was the second Leyland Line ship that was called Iberian. The first was completed in 1867 for Bibby Line, transferred to Leyland Line in 1873, and lost in 1885.

== Building ==
Toward the end of the 1890s, Leyland & Co ordered two single-screw cargo ships from Sir James Laing & Sons of Sunderland. Yard number 576 was launched on 21 March 1900 as Iberian and completed that June. Yard number 579 was launched on 30 July as Belgian and completed that October. They were not sister ships: Iberian was 55 feet (17 m) longer and had a beam 3.5 feet (1.1 m) greater than Belgian. They were the only two ships that Laing ever built for Leyland.

Iberian's registered length was 437.0 ft (133.2 m), her beam was 48.8 ft (14.9 m), and her depth was 29.9 ft (9.1 m). Her tonnages were 5,223 GRT and 3,347 NRT. She had a three-cylinder triple-expansion engine that was built by John Dickinson and Sons of Monkwearmouth. It was rated at 470 NHP, and gave her a speed of 12 knots (22 km/h).

Leyland registered Iberian at Liverpool. Her UK official number was 113367 and her code letters were RQNM. By 1914 she was equipped for wireless telegraphy, supplied and operated by the Marconi Company. Her call sign was MHA.

== Loss ==
Toward the end of July 1915 Iberian left Manchester, England for Boston, Massachusetts, laden with general cargo. On 30 July U-28 torpedoed her in the Southwestern Approaches about 9 nautical miles (17 km) southwest of Fastnet Rock, Ireland. U-28's commander, Kapitänleutnant Freiherr Georg-Günther von Forstner, reported that the torpedo hit Iberian's stern, and that she sank rapidly, stern-first, with her bow clear of the sea, and her hull almost vertical. Five of Iberian's crew were killed in the sinking. 62 abandoned ship in her lifeboats, but two of these also died, raising the total number killed to seven.

About 25 seconds after the ship had sunk, there was a powerful explosion, which was almost certainly her boilers exploding. The explosion threw débris from the ship about 80 feet (24 m) above the surface of the sea. Forstner reported that as well as the débris, the explosion threw into the air a giant sea creature, about 60 feet (18 m) long. It had four limbs with large webbed feet, a long, tapered head, and a long, tapered tail. The animal was visible for 10 to 15 seconds before disappearing below the surface.

== Wreck ==
Iberian's wreck is at 51°15′N 9°36′W, at a depth of about 104 metres (341 ft). It is in the territorial waters of the Republic of Ireland and protected by Irish law.

== Bibliography ==
- Haws, Duncan (1979). The Ships of the Cunard, American, Red Star, Inman, Leyland, Dominion, Atlantic Transport and White Star lines. Merchant Fleets in Profile. Vol. 2. Cambridge: Patrick Stephens Ltd. ISBN 0-85059-324-7.
- Lloyd's Register of Shipping. Vol. I.–Steamers. London: Lloyd's Register of Shipping. 1901 – via Internet Archive.
- The Marconi Press Agency Ltd (1914). The Year Book of Wireless Telegraphy and Telephony. London: The Marconi Press Agency Ltd.
- Mercantile Navy List. London. 1901 – via Crew List Index Project.
