= Helene Brehm =

German poet and teacher (1862–1932)

- Born: 24 January 1862; Abterode, Electorate of Hesse, Germany
- Died: 24 August 1932 (aged 70); Rinteln, Lower Saxony, Germany
- Occupations: Educator; poet; author
- Parent(s): Abterode Johannes Brehm; Karoline Neuschäfer

Helene Brehm (24 January 1862 in Abterode, Electorate of Hesse – 24 August 1932 in Rinteln, Germany) was a German school teacher, poet, and author.

== Childhood and education ==
She was the youngest child of the mayor of Abterode Johannes Brehm and his second wife Karoline Neuschäfer, born seven years after her older sister Marie.

First she went to school in Abterode and later as the only girl among 17 boys a private school of pastor Wilhelm Johann Hermann Coing, priest in the parish of Abterode from 1843 through 1867.

She started to read very early. It was advantageous that her godfather Geord Dern ran the local post office in the house of the Brehm family, which also served as the living room. This way she could conveniently browse through new newspapers and journals.

At the age of two she suffered from scarlet fever, which permanently damaged her eyesight.

== Profession and later life ==
The pastor who taught her suggested to her parents, that as she was a bookworm, she should be allowed to go to university. Her parents decided that the profession of a school teacher would be the best choice for her.

So she went to the Carolinen school (Carolinenschule) in Eisenach, Germany, and became a teacher. After which she spent another year at her parents house and then took a position at höhere Mädchenschule in Bad Homburg v. d. Höhe. In May 1884 she was appointed at the city school (Stadtschule) in Rinteln, where she taught for nearly 35 years.

She had to retire from this position in spring 1919 because her eyesight was failing as a result of the scarlet fever early in life.

== Career ==
She began writing poems as a young girl. Most of her writing was written in the pergola in her garden. She wrote poems, essays, and stories about her local region, and the local mountain Meissner, which used to be called Wissener. She also wrote about the aristocratic family line of the Bilstein family, and about old Abterode, using local names, and rural customs. And also about here chosen home Rinteln, and the vicinity. Together with her older sister Marie she published the Abteröder calls of the night watchmen and the Abteröder new years song, to which she had music written by a music teacher in Rinteln. She sang it to him in two voices.

She published three books:

- Brehm, Helene (1909). Von heimischer Scholle. Gedichte [From native soil. Poems] (in German). Kassel: ruck und Verlag von Friedrich Scheel.
- Brehm, Helene (1922). Aus meinem Garten. Gedichte, mit Bildern von O. Gebhardt [From my Garden. Poems, with illustrations by O. Gebhardt] (in German). Melsungen: Heimatschollen-Verlag, A. Bernecker. GND 57895785X.
- Brehm, Helene (1925). Das Pochen an der Herztür. Erzählungen [The knocking on the hearts door. Stories] (in German). Marburg: M. G. Elwertsche Verlagsbuchhandlung. GND 578957868.

In the book 900 years Meissner-Abterode 1076–1976, Helene Brehm was honored as follows (translated from German):

The poet had the gift of depicting people in their lives and the landscape in its beauty, in linguistic simplicity and great truthfulness.

All that she wrote, she gleaned from the life and landscape around her. Helene Brehm has left behind a legacy that deserves to be kept alive.

== Bibliography ==
- Brehm, Helene (1924). "Etwas über mich selbst" [Something about myself]. Das Werratal (in German). 1: 113–114.
- Gier, Karl (1992). Heimatklänge aus dem Meißnerland. Helene Brehm = Geschichten & Gedichte [Native sounds from the Meissner region. Helene Brehm = Stories & Poems] (in German). Meißner-Alberode: Self-publishing. ASIN B00CXKV3EM.
