= Joachim Brehm =

German botanist (1789–1860)

Joachim Brehm (30 January 1789, Bamberg – 16 April 1860, Uitenhage) was a German pharmacist and plant collector who collected extensively in southern Africa. He graduated in 1807 in Bad Dürkheim and worked as assistant apothecary at Rastatt, Geneva, Strassbourg and Bern from 1811 till 1815. He emigrated to work in Cape Town, and was registered as an apothecary chemist in 1820. He developed an interest in botany shortly after his arrival in the Cape, started collecting and did experiments to establish possible medical uses of these plants. In 1822 and 1824, Franz von Paula Schrank published two articles on the collections of seeds, plants and bulbs that were sent to him by Brehm. He later opened a pharmacy in Uitenhage, created a garden and became general practitioner. He also bought two farms near Groot Winterhoek. He was commemorated by William Henry Harvey in the genus Brehmia (a junior synonym of Strychnos), and by Julius Hermann Schultes in Chlorophytum brehmeanum.

The standard author abbreviation Brehm is used to indicate this person as the author when citing a botanical name.
