= Living dinosaur =

Living dinosaur may refer to:

- Birds, the only known living dinosaurs
- Living fossils, extant taxa that closely resemble organisms otherwise known only from the fossil record
- Paleocene dinosaurs, non-avian dinosaurs alleged to have survived into the beginning of the Paleocene epoch
- Living dinosaurs, in beliefs adherent to the pseudosciences of cryptozoology and young Earth creationism, such as the Mokele-mbembe.
- Partridge Creek monster, the subject of a story by French writer Georges Dupuy

== See also ==
- Lazarus taxon, a taxon that disappears from the fossil record only to appear again later
