= COT =

COT, CoT or cot may refer to:

== Bed ==
- Camp bed (North American English)
- Infant bed (British English)

== Science and technology ==
- Car of Tomorrow, a car design used in NASCAR racing
- Cost of transport, an energy calculation
- Cotangent (cot), a trigonometric function
- Cyclooctatetraene, an unsaturated hydrocarbon
- Finger cot, a hygienic cover for a single finger
- Chain-of-thought prompting, a method of engineering language model prompts
- Malbec (French: Côt), a grape variety

== Government and military ==
- Colombian Time, the time zone used in Colombia; see Time in Colombia
- Comando de Operações Táticas, a Brazilian counter-terrorism force
- Commitments of Traders, a US market report
- Committee on Toxicity of Chemicals in Food, Consumer Products and the Environment, in the UK

== Transportation ==
- Coatesville station (Amtrak station code), US
- Cottingley railway station (National Rail station code), England
- Cotulla–La Salle County Airport IATA and FAA LID code COT
- Costa Airlines (former ICAO airline designator), a defunct airline

== People ==
- Cot (surname)
- Cot Deal (1923–2013), American baseball pitcher and coach

== Other uses ==
- Chicago Opera Theater, an opera company
- Cot Valley, Cornwall, England
- Club Olympique des Transports, a football club based in Tunis, Tunisia

== See also ==
- Cottage, a small house
  - Goahti, Sami hut or tent
  - Kohte, a German Scouting tent
- COTS (disambiguation)
- C_{0}t analysis, a biochemical technique
- Khat (disambiguation)
  - Khat, a drug
