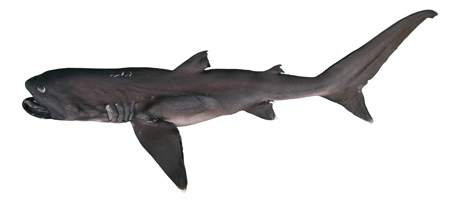
- Megachasma pelagios

Scientific classification
- Kingdom: Animalia
- Phylum: Chordata
- Class: Chondrichthyes
- Subclass: Elasmobranchii
- Division: Selachii
- Order: Lamniformes
- Family: Megachasmidae; Taylor, Compagno & Struhsaker, 1983
- Genus: Megachasma; Taylor, Compagno & Struhsaker, 1983

Species
- †Megachasma alisonae; †Megachasma applegatei; Megachasma pelagios

= Megachasma =

Megachasma Temporal range: Priabonian–recent

Genus of sharks

Megachasma is a genus of mackerel sharks. It is usually considered to be the sole genus in the family Megachasmidae, of which the Megamouth shark is the sole extant member, though suggestion has been made that it may belong in the family Cetorhinidae. Megachasma is known from a single living species, Megachasma pelagios.

In addition to the living M. pelagios, two extinct megamouth species – the Priabonian Megachasma alisonae and the Oligocene–Miocene Megachasma applegatei – have been discovered from fossilized tooth remains. An early ancestor of M. pelagios was reported from the Burdigalian of Belgium. However, the Cretaceous-aged M. comanchensis was reclassified as an odontaspid shark in the genus Pseudomegachasma, and is unrelated to the megamouth shark despite similar teeth morphology.

Megachasma is primarily found in temperate and tropical waters among the Pacific, Atlantic, and Indian oceans. The top sighting spots are Taiwan, Japan, and the Philippines.
