= Megachasma alisonae =

Megachasma alisonae Temporal range: Priabonian

Scientific classification
- Kingdom: Animalia
- Phylum: Chordata
- Class: Chondrichthyes
- Subclass: Elasmobranchii
- Division: Selachii
- Order: Lamniformes
- Family: Megachasmidae
- Genus: Megachasma
- Species: †M. alisonae

Binomial name
- †Megachasma alisonae Shimada & Ward, 2016

Extinct species of megamouth shark

Megachasma alisonae is an extinct species of megamouth shark that lived during the Eocene (Priabonian, ca. 36 mya). It is the oldest fossil record of a megamouth shark. The type fossil was recovered from the Søvind Marl Formation in Denmark and consists of a single tooth. Based on comparison with the teeth of the recent megamouth species (Megachasma pelagios), the length of the animal has been estimated at 1.3–3.5 m (4.3–11.5 ft).

== Discovery and naming ==
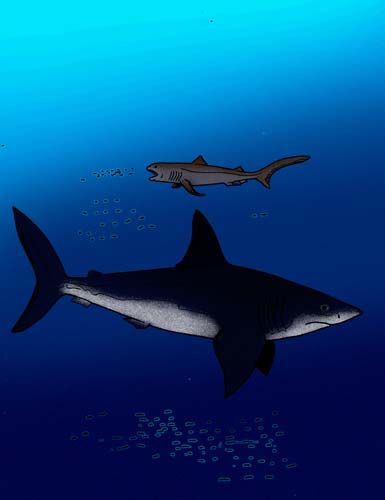
Megachasma alisonae (top) and Otodus auriculatus (bottom)

The holotype and only known specimen of M. alisonae is NHMUK PV P73711, an isolated tooth. It is nearly complete and either belonged to the right side of the upper jaw or the left side of the lower jaw. It was discovered on a sea cliff in the Pyt Member of the Søvind Marl Formation in Denmark. The tooth was discovered in a bulk sediment sample from the upper 50 cm (20 in) of the member that was collected in 1988. The species was described by Kenshu Shimada and David J. Ward in 2016. The specific name honors Alison Ward, who aided David J. Ward with the work that resulted in the type specimen's discovery.

== Classification ==
M. alisonae belongs to the same genus as the modern megamouth shark and the extinct species Megachasma applegatei. Megachasma itself belongs to the family Megachasmidae. Molecular studies have estimated that this family arose in the Upper Cretaceous. Due to a lack of fossil material, it has been hypothesized that the dental changes in this family occurred slowly enough to make their teeth harder to differentiate from other families of sharks early in their evolution. The tooth morphology of M. alisonae has a greater resemblance to that of Odontaspididae than seen in the other species of Megachasma. This supports the hypothesis that Megachasmidae is closely related to a group of sharks with odontaspidid-like teeth, perhaps the odontaspids themselves. The tooth morphology of M. alisonae also provides information needed to identify older megachasmid fossils.
