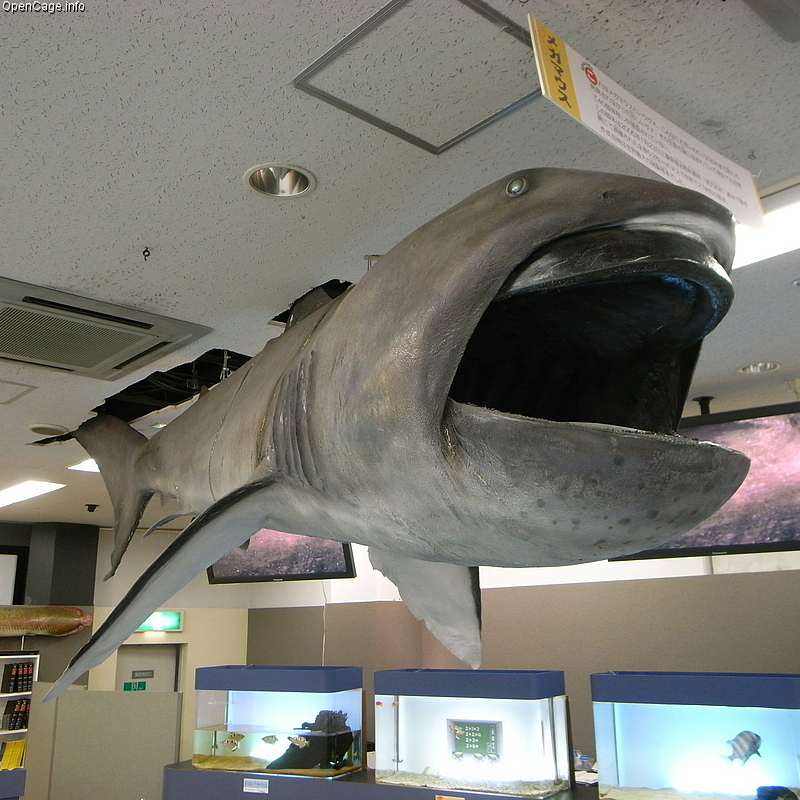
- Display at Toba Aquarium

Conservation status
- Least Concern (IUCN 3.1)

Scientific classification
- Kingdom: Animalia
- Phylum: Chordata
- Class: Chondrichthyes
- Subclass: Elasmobranchii
- Division: Selachii
- Order: Lamniformes
- Family: Megachasmidae
- Genus: Megachasma
- Species: M. pelagios

Binomial name
- Megachasma pelagios L. R. Taylor, Compagno & Struhsaker, 1983
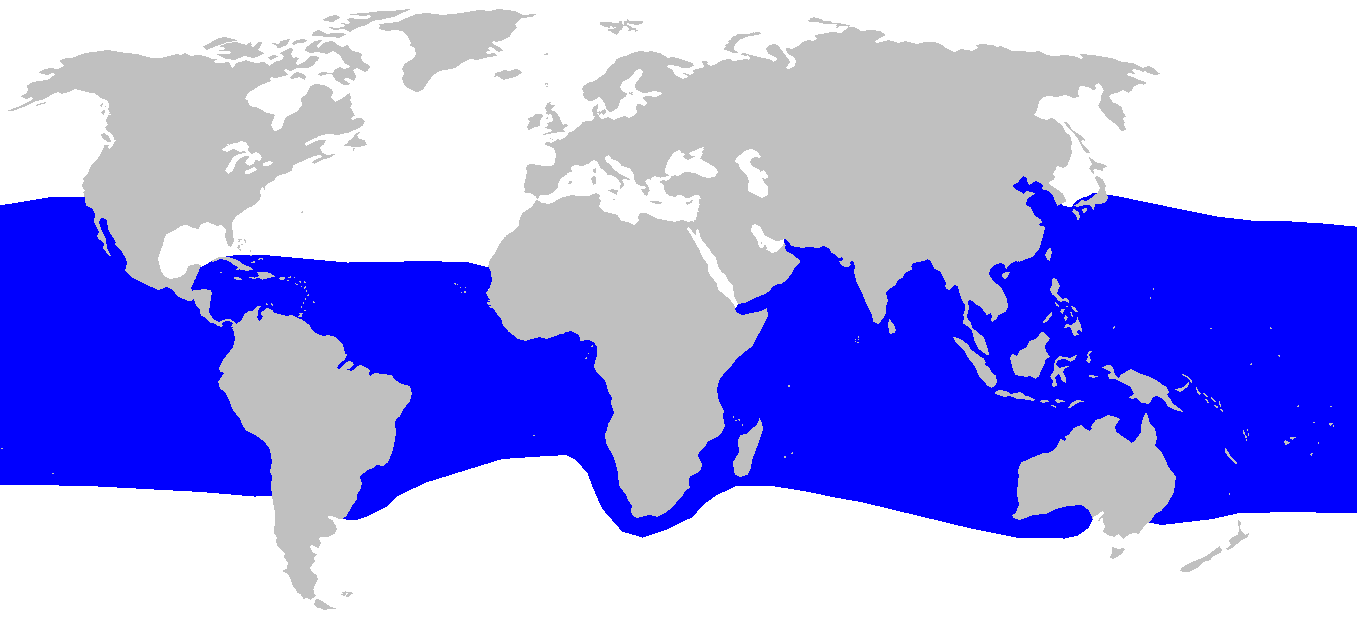
- Range of megamouth shark (in blue)

= Megamouth shark =

Species of shark

Fossil Megachasma tooth Pliocene of Antwerp (linkeroever) found with permission from Lantis to access the construction site (BVP-excursion).

The megamouth shark (Megachasma pelagios) is a species of deepwater shark. Rarely seen by humans, it measures around 4–5.5 m (13–18 ft) long and is the smallest of the three extant filter-feeding sharks alongside the much larger whale shark and basking shark. According to Sharkman's World Organization, a total of 296 specimens have been observed or caught since its discovery in 1976. Like the other two planktivorous sharks, it swims with its mouth wide open, filtering water for plankton and jellyfish. The diet of megamouth sharks mainly consists of zooplanktonic organisms like krill, jellyfish, shrimp larvae, squat lobsters, and crab larvae. It is recognizable from its large head with rubbery lips. The megamouth is so unlike any other type of shark that it is usually considered to be the sole extant species in the family Megachasmidae, though some scientists have suggested it may belong in the family Cetorhinidae.

== Taxonomy and evolution ==
The first megamouth shark was captured on November 15, 1976, about 25 miles northeast of Kahuku, Hawaii, when it became entangled in the sea anchor of United States Navy research vessel AFB-14 of the Naval Undersea Center at a depth of about 165 m (541 ft). The species was identified as a new species and in its own family, Megachasmidae. Fossil records suggest that the species existed about 36 million years ago, while molecular studies date the species back further, as far back as 100 million years. Examination of the 4.5-meter (15 ft), 750-kilogram (1,650 lb) specimen by Leighton R. Taylor showed it to be an entirely unknown type of shark, making it – along with the coelacanth – one of the more sensational discoveries in 20th-century ichthyology. The pectoral fin of the megamouth shark was studied, along with its skeletal and muscular system, to show its phylogenetic relationship to the other two planktivorous sharks.

Worldwide sightings of the megamouth shark as of 2012

As of March 25, 2025 only 296 megamouth specimens had been caught or sighted. They have been found in the Pacific, Atlantic, and Indian Oceans. Japan, the Philippines, and Taiwan have each yielded at least 10 specimens, the most of any single area, amounting to more than half the worldwide total. Specimens have also been sighted in or come out of the waters near Hawaii, California, Mexico, Indonesia, Australia, Brazil, Senegal, South Africa, Puerto Rico, Ecuador, Australia, Peru, Panama and possibly Vietnam.

Researchers have predicted the feeding patterns of megamouth sharks in relation to the other two planktivorous sharks; the three planktivorous sharks have ram feeding in common, as it evolved from ram feeding swimming-type ancestors that developed their filtering mechanism to capture small prey like plankton. In addition to the living M. pelagios, however, two extinct megamouth species – the Priabonian M. alisonae and the Oligocene–Miocene M. applegatei – have also recently been proposed on the basis of fossilized tooth remains. An early ancestor of the recent species Megachasma pelagios was reported from the early Miocene (Burdigalian) of Belgium. However, the Cretaceous-aged M. comanchensis has been recently reclassified as an odontaspid shark in the genus Pseudomegachasma, and is in fact unrelated to the megamouth shark despite similar teeth morphology. The megamouth's filter-feeding adaptations likely evolved independently from other extant filter-feeding sharks, even the lamniform basking shark, making it an example of convergent evolution.

== Description ==
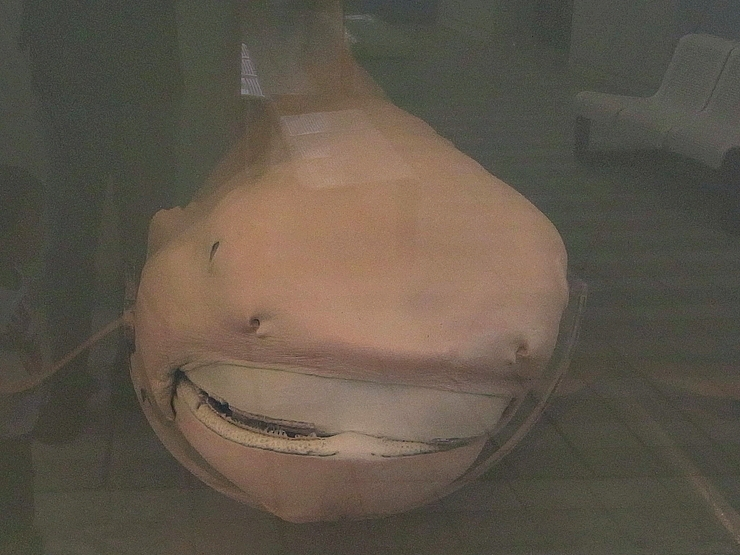
Frontal view of a preserved specimen at Marine World Uminonakamichi

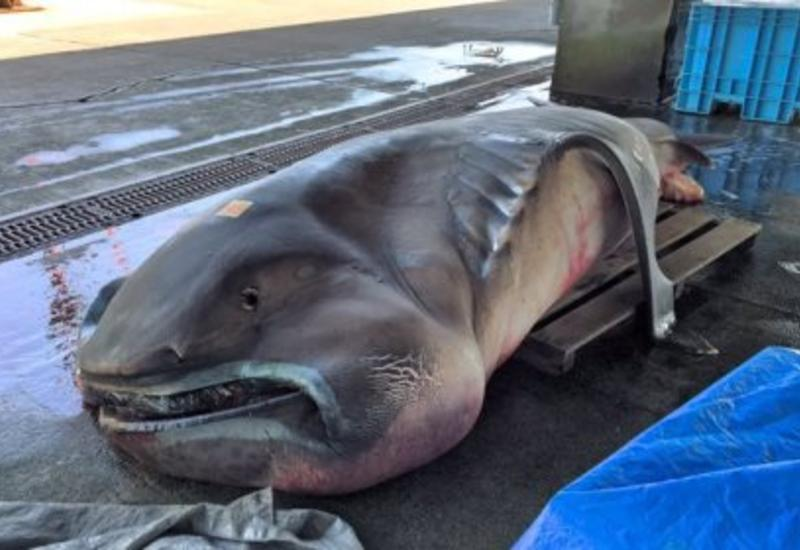
Individual captured off the coast of Mie Prefecture, Japan, in 2016

The appearance of the megamouth is distinctive, but little else is known about it. It has a brownish-black colour on top, is white underneath, and has an asymmetrical tail with a long upper lobe, similar to that of the thresher shark. The interior of its gill slits are lined with finger-like gill rakers that capture its food. A relatively poor swimmer, the megamouth has a soft, flabby body and lacks caudal keels. The megamouth is considerably less active than the other filter-feeding sharks, the basking shark and the whale shark. The megamouth has a stout body and a long, wide bulbous head.

Megamouths are large sharks, able to grow to 5.49 metres (18 ft 0 in) in length. Mature males average at 4 m (13 ft) and females at 5 m (16 ft). Weights of up to 1,215 kg (2,679 lb) have been reported. A 2019 study suggested the megamouth may reach 6 m (20 ft) in maximum length. A 2024 study estimated that a male specimen caught off the coast of Ecuador in 2014 may have measured 8–9 metres (26–30 ft) in total length, based on eyewitness accounts and the dimensions of the caudal fin. Megamouth sharks can be found as far northward as northern Japan; southern California (LACM 43745-1) and near Punta Eugenia, Baja California, and Hawaii. Megamouth sharks can be found at a depth of up to 1,500 metres (4,900 ft). Megamouth sharks are dark blue, brownish-black, or gray above, lighter below; with a white band along the upper jaw; while the posterior margin of its fins are white.

As their name implies, megamouths have a large mouth with small teeth, and a broad, rounded snout, causing observers occasionally to mistake the megamouth for a young orca. The protruding inside of the upper lip is a brilliant silvery-white, which is very visible when the mouth is open. This lip was initially thought to potentially be embedded by luminous photophores when the first shark was examined in the early 1980s, which may act as a lure for plankton. A later team of researchers examining the second captured specimen in the mid-1980s instead proposed that the lower lip might reflect light to produce a glow, but neither theory has been proven. In 2020, a study concluded that megamouths do not in fact produce any light; the white band was found to merely be highly reflective of light. This white band is present in both sexes and could be either a feeding mechanism or possibly be used as a means of identifying other individuals of megamouth sharks. Study of a single specimen revealed electrosensory pores concentrated on the shark's head. While this specimen had less ampullary pores than any other known species of shark, the pores may still allow for electrosensory detection of prey to enhance feeding efficiency. Their mouths can reach up to 1.3 m (4 ft 3 in) in width. Megamouth sharks have up to 50 rows of teeth in their upper-jaw and up to 75 rows of teeth in their lower-jaw. The teeth of the megamouth shark are small and peg-like.

== Behaviour ==
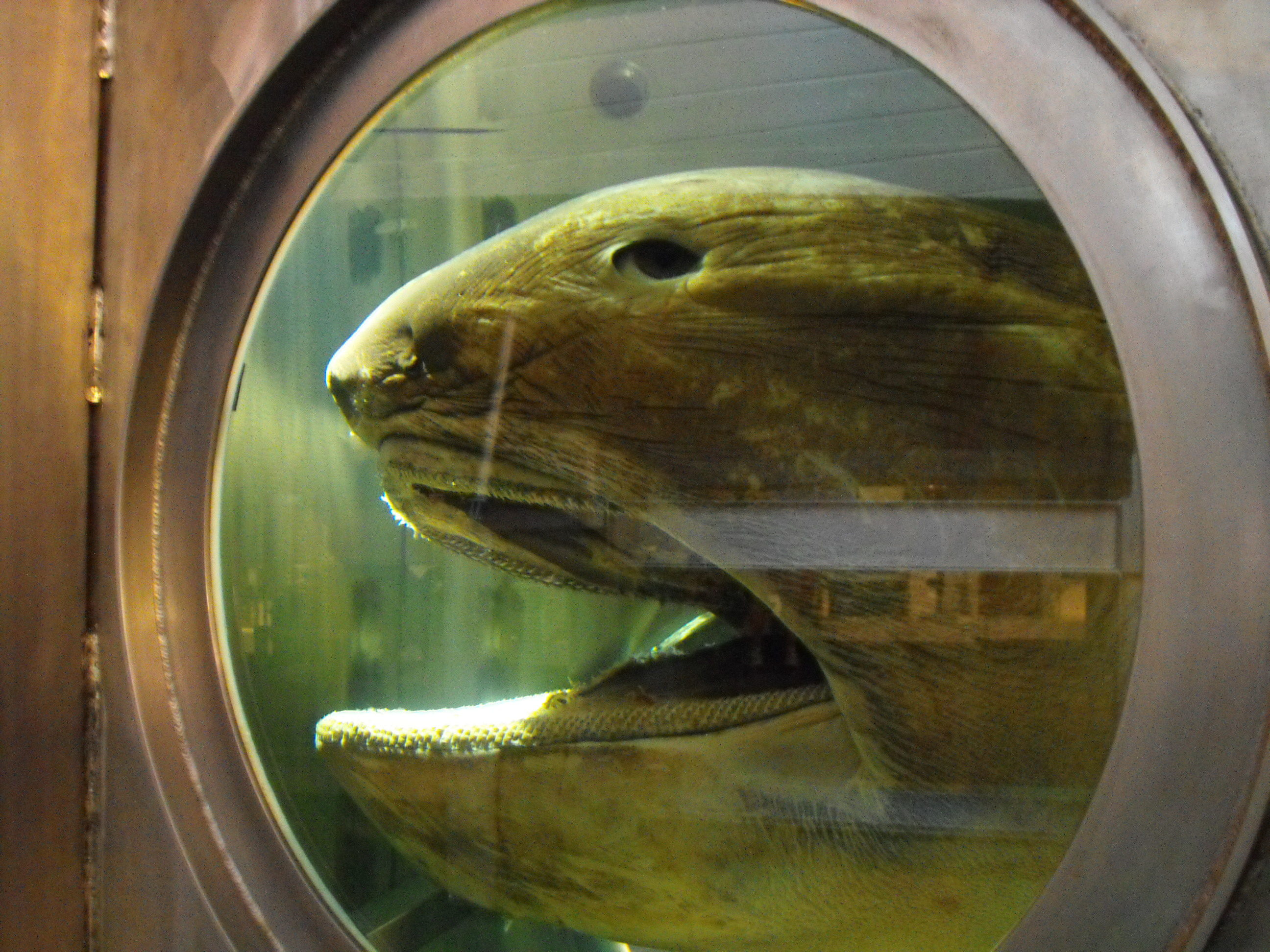
Head of a megamouth shark, at Western Australian Maritime Museum

In 1990, a 4.9-m (16-foot) male megamouth shark was caught near the surface off Dana Point, California. This individual was eventually released with a small radio tag attached to its soft body. The tag relayed depth and time information over a two-day period. During the day, the shark swam at a depth around 120–160 m (390–520 ft), but as the sun set, it would ascend and spend the night at depths between 12 and 25 m (39 and 82 ft). Both day and night, its progress was very slow, around 1.5–2.1 km/h (0.81–1.13 kn). In a 2024 study, three sharks were tagged off the coast of Taiwan and tracked over a multi-month period. The sharks reached a maximum depth of about 400–700 m (1310–2300 ft) during the day, on average. At night, they typically reached their minimum depth of 0–50 m (0–165 ft). This pattern of vertical migration is seen in many marine animals as they track the movement of plankton in the water column.

Megamouth sharks undergo some seasonal migration as well, although this may be less consistent between individuals. While one shark migrated north from Taiwan during the summer, another migrated south. In one instance, two megamouth sharks were observed together by fishermen off the coast of California. This revealed previously unknown social behaviors between individuals. Potential explanations for the behavior include foraging or mating, although neither behavior was specifically observed.

== Reproduction ==
Reproduction is ovoviviparous, meaning that the young sharks develop in eggs that remain within the mother's body until they hatch. Tissue samples were obtained from twenty-seven megamouths caught in a two-year period off the Hualien coast (eastern Taiwan), and two caught in Baja California, Mexico, and samples taken from GenBank to perform a population genetic analyses of the megamouth shark; the results indicated no genetic diversity between populations found in different geographical locations, which indicates the species forms a single, highly migratory, interbreeding population. Fishermen encountered and recorded two megamouth sharks on September 11, 2022— the first instance multiple members of the species were caught on camera at once. In the footage, the male shark closely followed the female shark, trailing underneath her. While unclear, it's possible that the footage documented potential courtship behavior of the megamouth shark as trailing is associated with pre-copulatory behavior in other closely related shark species.
