= Cot Valley =

Valley in Cornwall, England

Coordinates: 50.117°N 5.691°W

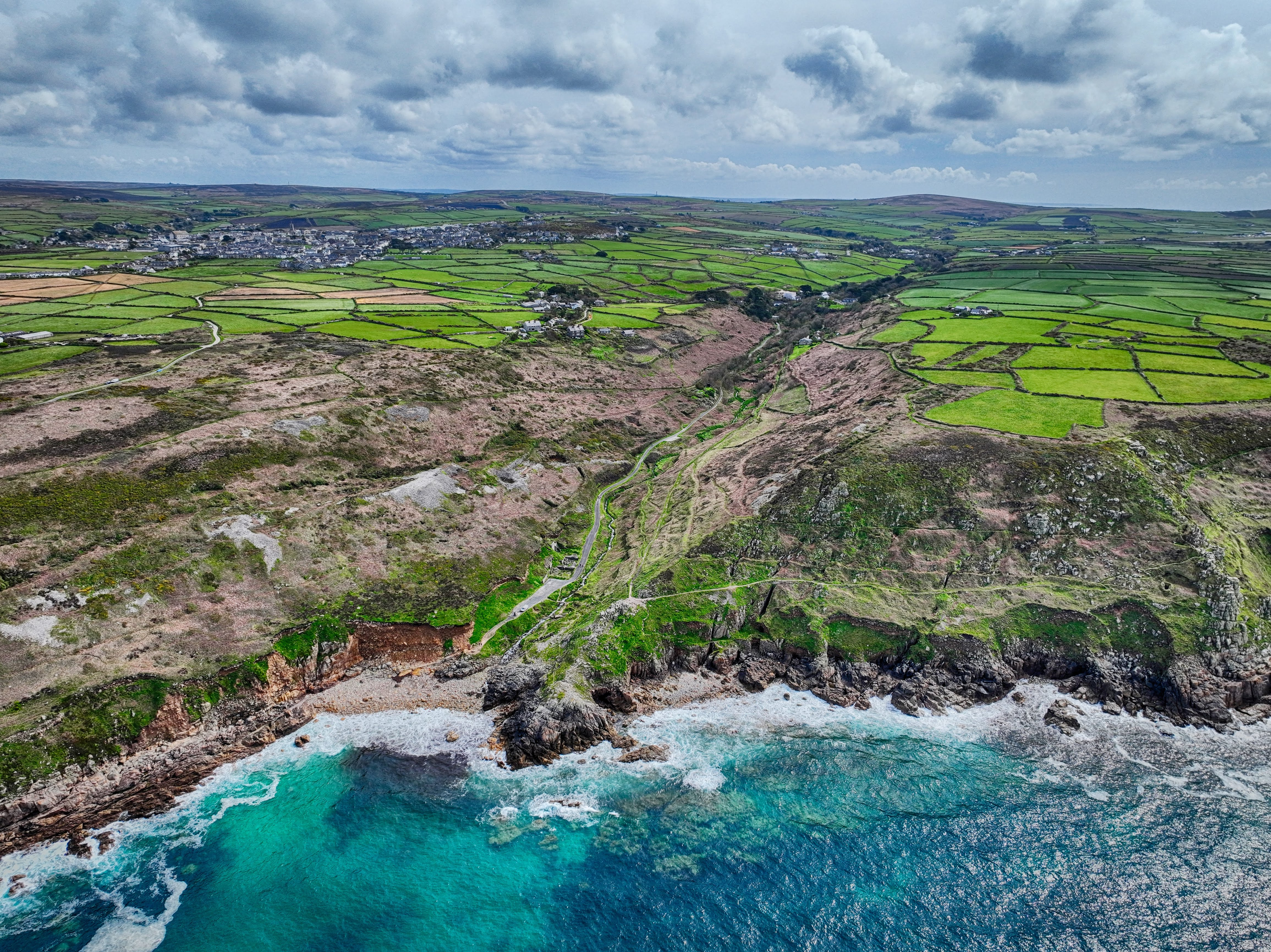
Cot Valley as seen from the air looking inland

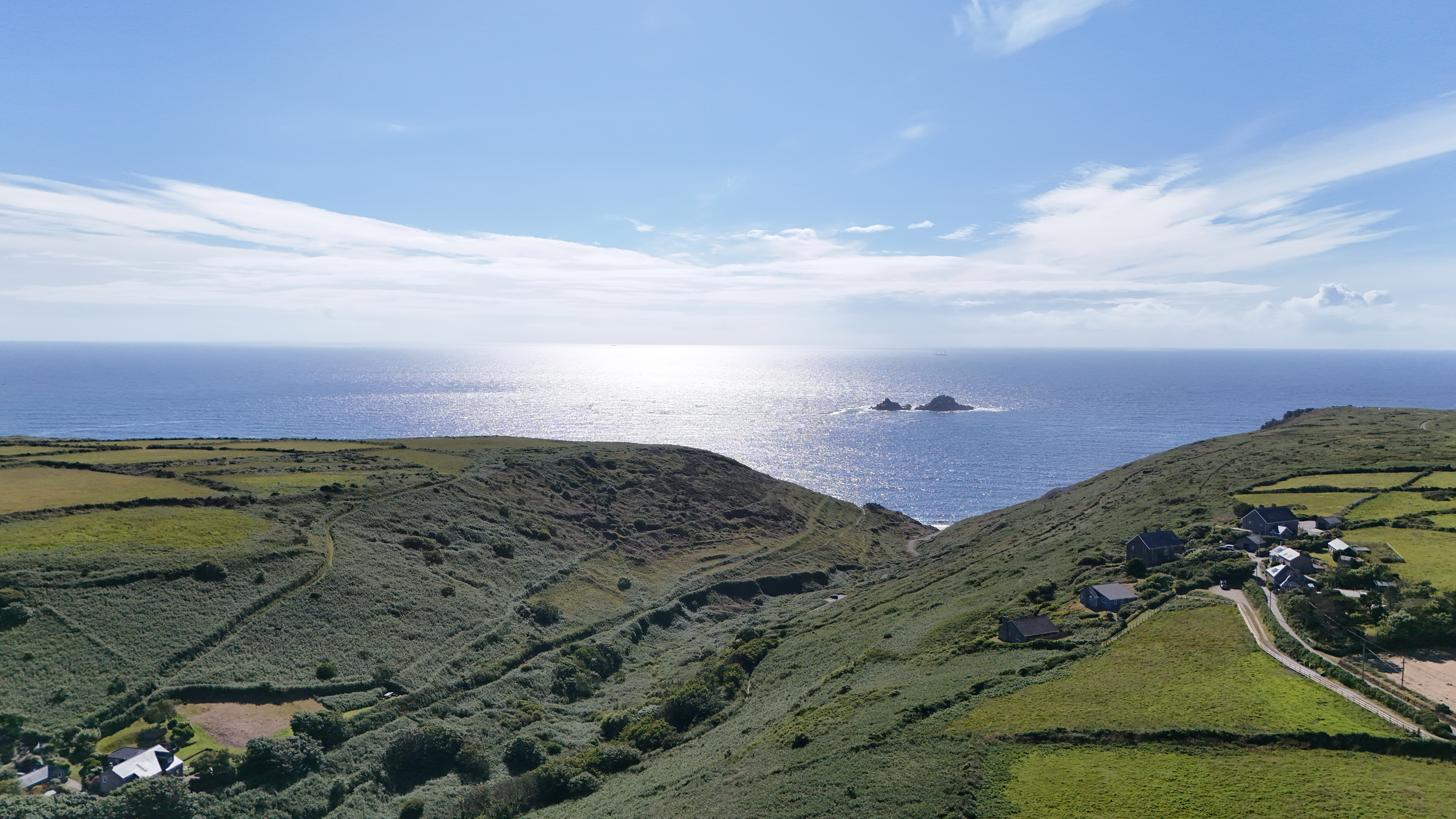
Cot Valley as seen from the air looking to sea

Cot Valley is located half-a-mile south of St Just in west Cornwall, United Kingdom. It has a very mild microclimate.

The stream which runs down the valley discharges into the Atlantic Ocean at Nanven. This area of Cornwall was once mined for tin (see Mining in Cornwall for details) as evidenced today by the ruins along the stream.

There is a settlement in Cot Valley and a youth hostel. The valley is secluded and is home to a variety of wildlife. Birdwatchers visit in autumn to see rare vagrants and migratory birds. More recently Cornish choughs have been seen in the valley; other birds regularly seen include buzzards, tawny owls, and stonechats. From the mouth of the valley at Porth Nanven, seals are frequently seen and occasionally dolphins and basking sharks.
