= COTS =

COTS may refer to:

- Commercial off-the-shelf, products that are commercially available and can be bought "as is"
- Commercial Orbital Transportation Services, a NASA program for delivery to the International Space Station by private companies
- Crown-of-thorns starfish, a large, multiple-armed starfish

== See also ==
- COT (disambiguation)
