= Stronsay Beast =

Sea carcass found in Scotland in 1808

Sketch of the Stronsay beast made by Sir Alexander Gibson in 1808.

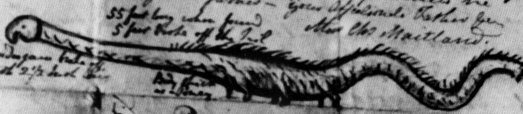
Another sketch of the Stronsay beast.

The Stronsay Beast was a large globster (unidentified organism) that washed ashore on the island of Stronsay (at the time spelled Stronsa), in the Orkney Islands, Scotland, after a storm on 25 September 1808. The carcass was measured as 55 ft (16.8 m) in length, without part of its tail. The Natural History Society (Wernerian Society) of Edinburgh could not identify the carcass and decided it was a new species, probably a sea serpent. The Scottish naturalist Patrick Neill gave it the scientific name Halsydrus pontoppidani (Pontoppidan's sea-snake) in honour of Erik Pontoppidan, who described sea serpents in a work published half a century previously. The anatomist Sir Everard Home in London later dismissed the measurement, declaring it must have been about 30 ft (9 m), and deemed it to be a decayed basking shark. In 1849, Scottish professor John Goodsir in Edinburgh made the same conclusion. The zoologist Karl Shuker defends the purported length of the carcass, as it was measured on multiple occasions to be 55 feet long, and suggests the animal was a hitherto undescribed larger relative of the basking shark.

The Beast of Stronsay was measured by a carpenter and two farmers. It was 4 ft (1.2 m) wide and had a circumference of about 10 ft (3.1 m). It had three pairs of appendages described as 'paws' or 'wings'. Its skin was smooth when stroked head to tail and rough when stroked tail to head. Its fins were edged with bristles and it had a row of bristles down its back, which glowed in the dark when wet. Its stomach contents were red.

== See also ==
- Zuiyo-maru carcass
