= Caucasochasma =

Caucasochasma Temporal range: early Oligocene

Scientific classification
- Kingdom: Animalia
- Phylum: Chordata
- Class: Chondrichthyes
- Subclass: Elasmobranchii
- Division: Selachii
- Order: Lamniformes
- Family: Cetorhinidae
- Genus: †Caucasochasma; Prokofiev & Sychevskaya, 2018
- Species: †C. zherikhini

Binomial name
- †Caucasochasma zherikhini Prokofiev & Sychevskaya, 2018

Extinct genus of sharks

Caucasochasma is an extinct genus of basking sharks that lived during the Oligocene. It contains one species, C. zherikhini. It is known from a mostly-complete skeleton from the Pshekha Formation of Russia. It has a body plan more similar to sand sharks than to extant basking sharks, which indicates that it was a benthic filter feeder.
