= Khat (disambiguation) =

Khat is a flowering plant chewed for its stimulant effects.

Khat may also refer to:

- Charpai or khat, four-footed bed from north India, origin of the word cot
- Khat (apparel), a headcloth worn by ancient Egyptians
- Khat, an alternative name for the village Hat, Azerbaijan
- KHAT, a radio station broadcasting in Laramie, Wyoming
- Khatt, Islamic calligraphy or Arabic calligraphy

== See also ==
- COT (disambiguation)
- Catechu, a stimulant sometimes referred to as "kath", completely unrelated to khat
- Khatt, a village in United Arab Emirates
