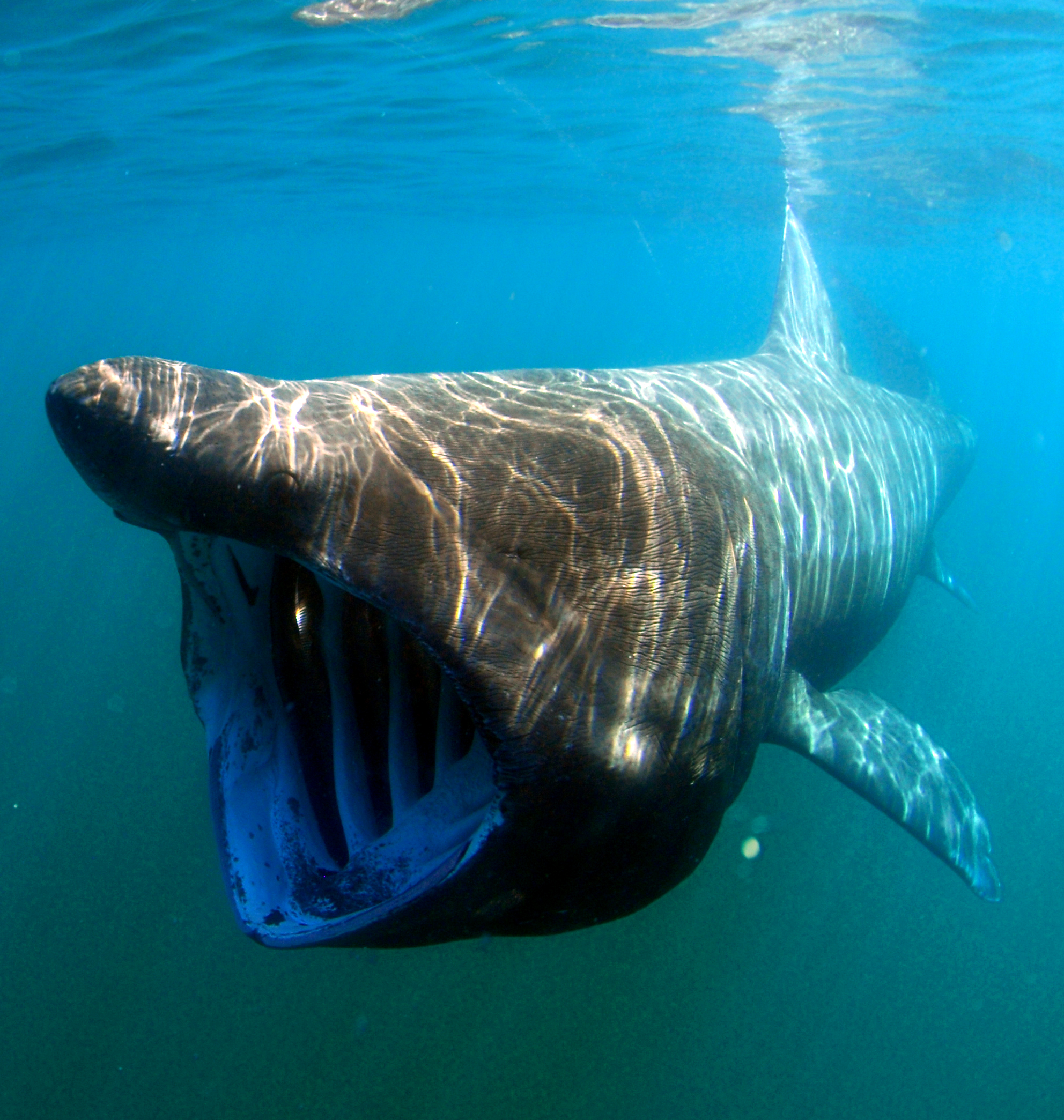

- The size of basking sharks at various stages of growth and maturity with a human for scale

Conservation status
- Endangered (IUCN 3.1)
- CITES Appendix II

Scientific classification
- Kingdom: Animalia
- Phylum: Chordata
- Class: Chondrichthyes
- Subclass: Elasmobranchii
- Division: Selachii
- Order: Lamniformes
- Family: Cetorhinidae
- Genus: Cetorhinus; Blainville, 1816
- Species: C. maximus

Binomial name
- Cetorhinus maximus (Gunnerus, 1765)
- Range of the basking shark

Synonyms
- click to expand: Squalus maximus Gunnerus, 1765; Selache maxima (Gunnerus, 1765); Halsydrus pontoppidiani* Neill, 1809; Squalus gunnerianus Blainville, 1810; Squalus homianus Blainville, 1810; Squalus pelegrinus Blainville, 1810; Tetraoras angiova* Rafinesque, 1810; Tetroras angiova* Rafinesque, 1810; Squalis gunneri* Blainville, 1816; Squalis shavianus* Blainville, 1816; Scoliophis atlanticus* Anonymous, 1817; Squalus isodus Macri, 1819; Squalus rostratus Macri, 1819; Squalus elephas Lesueur, 1822; Squalus rashleighanus Couch, 1838; Squalus rhinoceros* DeKay, 1842; Squalus cetaceus Gronow, 1854; Polyprosopus macer Couch, 1862; Cetorhinus blainvillei Capello, 1869; Hanovera aurata van Beneden, 1871; Selachus pennantii Cornish, 1885; Tetroras maccoyi Barrett, 1933; Cetorhinus maximus infanuncula Deinse & Adriani, 1953; Cetorhinus normani Siccardi, 1961; ----; * ambiguous synonym

= Basking shark =

Basking Shark Temporal range: Miocene–Present

Species of shark

The basking shark (Cetorhinus maximus) is the second-largest living shark and fish, after the whale shark. It is one of three plankton-eating shark species, along with the whale shark and megamouth shark. Typically, basking sharks reach 7.9 m (26 ft) in length, but large individuals have been known to grow more than 10 m (33 ft) long. It is usually greyish-brown, with mottled skin, with the inside of the mouth being white in colour. The caudal fin has a strong lateral keel and a crescent shape. Other common names include bone shark, elephant shark, sailfish, and sunfish.

The basking shark is a cosmopolitan migratory species found in all the world's temperate oceans. A slow-moving filter feeder, its common name derives from its habit of feeding at the surface, appearing to be basking in the warmer water there. It has anatomical adaptations for filter-feeding, such as a greatly enlarged mouth and highly developed gill rakers. Its snout is conical, and the gill slits extend around the top and bottom of its head. The gill rakers, dark and bristle-like, are used to catch plankton as water filters through the mouth and over the gills. The teeth are numerous, often numbering 100 per row. The teeth are very small, have a single conical cusp, are curved backwards, and are the same on both the upper and lower jaws. This species has the smallest weight-for-weight brain size of any shark, reflecting its relatively passive lifestyle.

Basking sharks have been shown from satellite tracking to overwinter in both continental shelf (less than 200 m or 660 ft) and deeper waters. They may be found either in small shoals or alone. Despite their large size and threatening appearance, basking sharks are not aggressive and are harmless to humans.

The basking shark has long been a commercially important fish as a source of food, shark fin, animal feed, and shark liver oil. Overexploitation has reduced its populations to the point where some have disappeared and others need protection.

== Taxonomy ==
The basking shark is the only extant member of the family Cetorhinidae, part of the mackerel shark order Lamniformes. Johan Ernst Gunnerus first described the species as Cetorhinus maximus from a specimen found in Norway. The genus name Cetorhinus was published without an etymology, but is presumed to be from the Geek ketos, meaning "marine monster" or "whale", and rhine, an ancient obscure Greek word meaning "shark". The species name maximus is from Latin and means "greatest". Following its initial description, more attempts at naming included: Squalus isodus, by Italian zoologist Saverio Macri (1754–1848) in 1819; Squalus elephas, by Charles Alexandre Lesueur in 1822; Squalus rashleighanus, by Jonathan Couch in 1838; Squalus cetaceus, by Laurens Theodorus Gronovius in 1854; Cetorhinus blainvillei, by the Portuguese biologist Felix Antonio de Brito Capello (1828–1879) in 1869; Selachus pennantii, by Charles John Cornish in 1885; Cetorhinus maximus infanuncula, by Dutch zoologists Antonius Boudewijn Deinse (1885–1965) and Marcus Jan Adriani (1929–1995) in 1953; and Cetorhinus maximus normani, by Siccardi in 1961. In Orkney, it is called hoe-mother (contracted homer), meaning "the mother of the piked dogfish".

=== Evolutionary history ===
The oldest known members of Cetorhinidae are members of the extinct genus Keasius, from the middle Eocene of Antarctica, the Eocene of Oregon, and possibly the Eocene of Russia. Members of the modern genus Cetorhinus appear during the Miocene, with members of the modern species appearing during the Late Miocene. The association of Pseudocetorhinus from the Late Triassic of Europe with Cetorhinidae is doubtful.

== Range and habitat ==
The basking shark is a coastal-pelagic shark found worldwide in boreal to warm-temperate waters. It lives around the continental shelf and occasionally enters brackish waters. It is found from the surface down to at least 910 m (2,990 ft). It prefers temperatures of 8 to 14.5 °C (46.4 to 58.1 °F) but has been confirmed to cross the much warmer waters at the equator. It is often seen close to land, including in bays with narrow openings. The shark follows plankton concentrations in the water column, so it is often visible at the surface. It characteristically migrates with the seasons.

== Anatomy and appearance ==
The basking shark regularly reaches 7–8.5 m (23–28 ft) in length with some individuals reaching 9–11 m (30–36 ft). The average length of an adult is around 7.9 m (26 ft) weighing about 4.65 t (4.58 long tons; 5.13 short tons). Historical sightings suggest basking sharks around 12 m (39 ft) in length, including three basking sharks estimated at ~40 fod (12.5 metres or 41 ft) and ~45 fod (14 metres or 46 ft) were reported between 1884 and 1905, but these visual estimates lack good evidence. A 12.27 m (40.3 ft) specimen trapped in a herring net in the Bay of Fundy, Canada in 1851 has been credited as the largest recorded. Its weight has been estimated at 16 t (16 long tons; 18 short tons). A study looking at the growth and longevity of the basking shark suggested that individuals larger than ~10 m (33 ft) are unlikely. It is the second-largest extant fish species, after the whale shark.

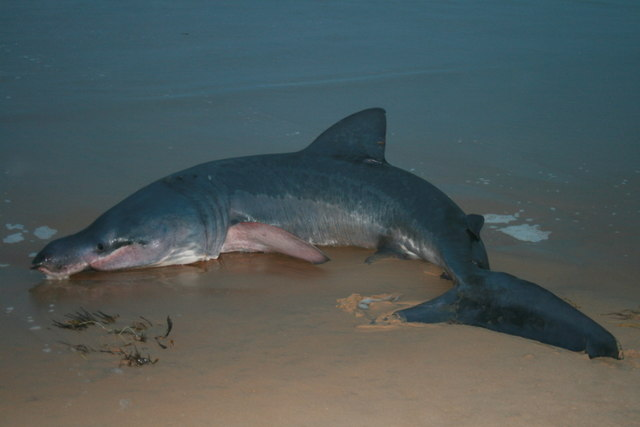
Beached basking shark

They possess the typical shark lamniform body plan and have been mistaken for great white sharks. The two species can be easily distinguished by the basking shark's cavernous jaw, up to 1 m (3 ft 3 in) in width, longer and more obvious gill slits that nearly encircle the head and are accompanied by well-developed gill rakers, smaller eyes, much larger overall size, and smaller average girth. Great whites possess large, dagger-like teeth, while basking shark teeth are much smaller at 5–6 mm (0.20–0.24 in), and hooked; only the first three or four rows of the upper jaw and six or seven rows of the lower jaw function. In behaviour, the great white is an active predator of large animals, not a filter feeder.

Other distinctive characteristics include a strongly keeled caudal peduncle, highly textured skin covered in placoid scales and a mucus layer, a lunate caudal fin, and a pointed snout—distinctly hooked in younger specimens. In large individuals, the dorsal fin may flop to one side when above the surface. Colouration is highly variable (and likely dependent on observation conditions and the individual's condition): commonly, the colouring is dark brown to black or blue dorsally, fading to a dull white ventrally. The sharks are often noticeably scarred, possibly through encounters with lampreys or cookiecutter sharks. The basking shark's liver, which may account for 25% of its body weight, runs the entire length of the abdominal cavity and is thought to play a role in buoyancy regulation and long-term energy storage.

On several occasions, decomposing basking shark remains were the most likely explanations for "globsters," or initially unidentified remains found washed up on beaches or otherwise encountered. Examples include the Stronsay Beast from the early 1800s and the Zuiyo-maru case of the 1970s.

== Life history ==
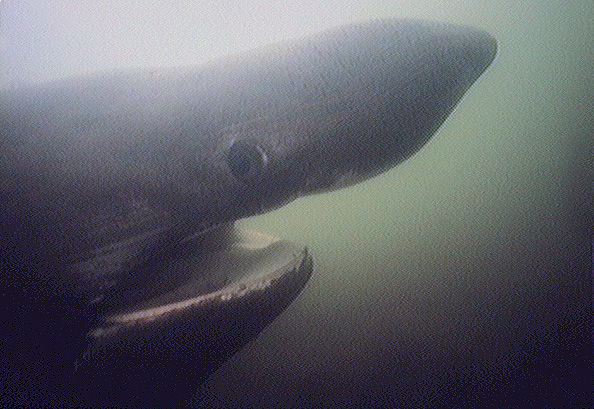
Head of a basking shark

Basking sharks do not hibernate and are active year-round. In winter, basking sharks often move to deeper depths, even down to 900 m (3,000 ft) and have been tracked making vertical movements consistent with feeding on overwintering zooplankton.

== Surfacing behaviors ==
They are slow-moving sharks (feeding at about 2 knots (3.7 kilometres per hour; 2.3 miles per hour)) and do not evade approaching boats (unlike great white sharks). They are not attracted to chum.

The basking shark is large and slow, but it can breach jump entirely out of the water. This behaviour could be an attempt to dislodge parasites or commensals. Such interpretations are speculative, however, and difficult to verify; breaching in large marine animals such as whales and sharks might equally well be intraspecific threat displays of size and strength.

=== Migration ===
Argos system satellite tagging of 20 basking sharks in 2003 confirmed basking sharks move thousands of kilometres during the summer and winter, seeking the richest zooplankton patches, often along ocean fronts. They shed and renew their gill rakers in an ongoing process, rather than over one short period.

A 2009 study tagged 25 sharks off the coast of Cape Cod, Massachusetts, and indicated at least some migrate south in the winter. Remaining at depths between 200 and 1,000 metres (660 and 3,280 ft) for many weeks, the tagged sharks crossed the equator to reach Brazil. One individual spent a month near the mouth of the Amazon River. They may undertake this journey to aid reproduction.

On 23 June 2015, a 6.1-metre-long (20 ft), 3,500-kilogram (7,716 lb) basking shark was caught accidentally by a fishing trawler in the Bass strait near Portland, Victoria, in southeast Australia, the first basking shark caught in the region since the 1930s, and only the third reported in the region in 160 years. The whole shark was donated to the Victoria Museum for research, instead of the fins being sold for use in shark fin soup.

While basking sharks are not infrequently seen in the Mediterranean Sea and records exist in the Dardanelles Strait, it is unclear whether they historically reached deeper basins of the Sea of Marmara, Black Sea, and Sea of Azov.

=== Social behaviour ===
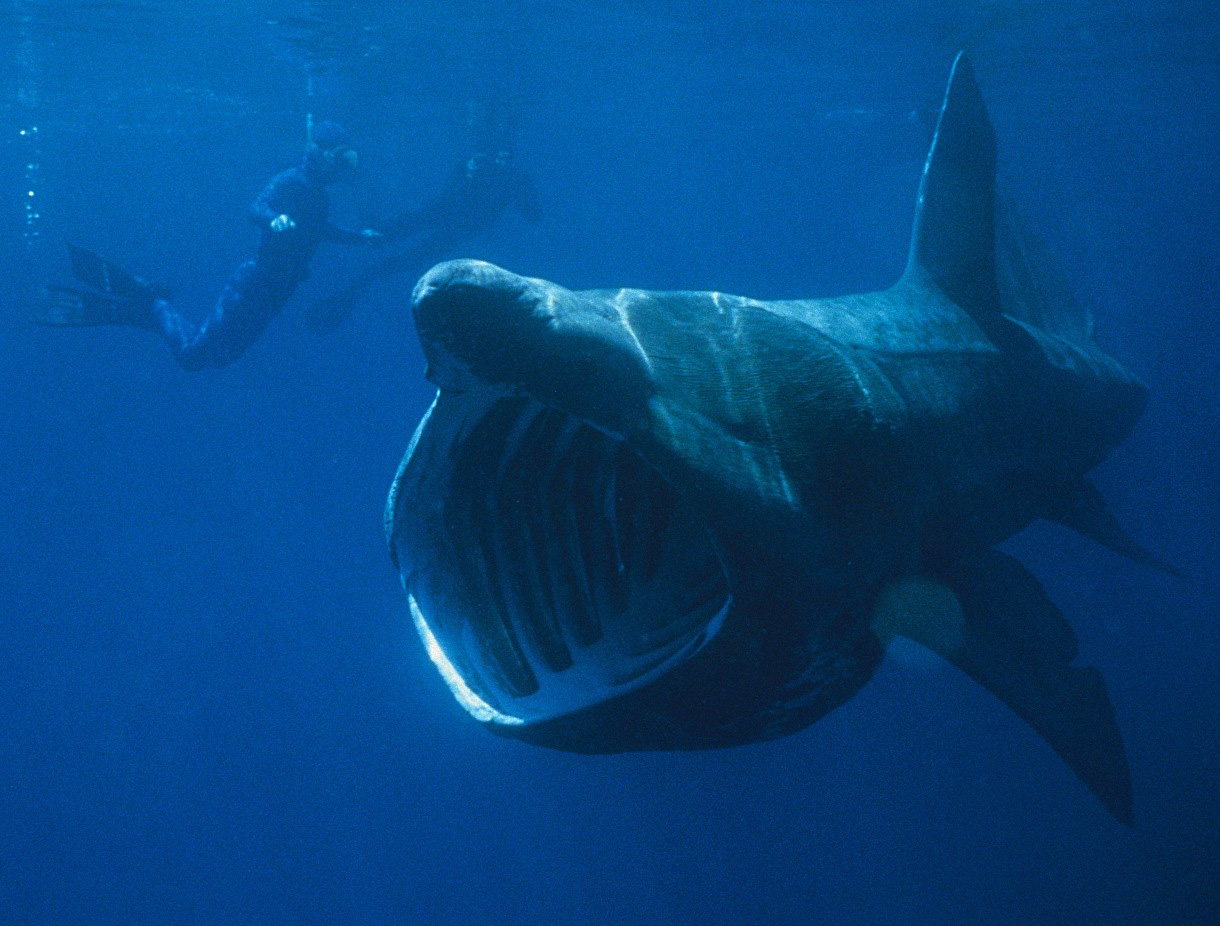
A basking shark filter feeding

Basking sharks are usually solitary, but during summer months in particular, they aggregate in dense patches of zooplankton, where they engage in social behaviour. They can form sex-segregated shoals, usually in small numbers (three or four), but reportedly up to 100 individuals. Small schools in the Bay of Fundy and the Hebrides have been seen swimming nose to tail in circles; their social behaviour in summer months has been studied and is thought to represent courtship.

=== Predators ===
Basking sharks have few predators. White sharks have been reported to scavenge on the remains of these sharks. Killer whales have been observed feeding on basking sharks off California in the US and New Zealand. Lampreys are often seen attached to them, although they are unlikely to be able to cut through the shark's thick skin.

=== Diet ===
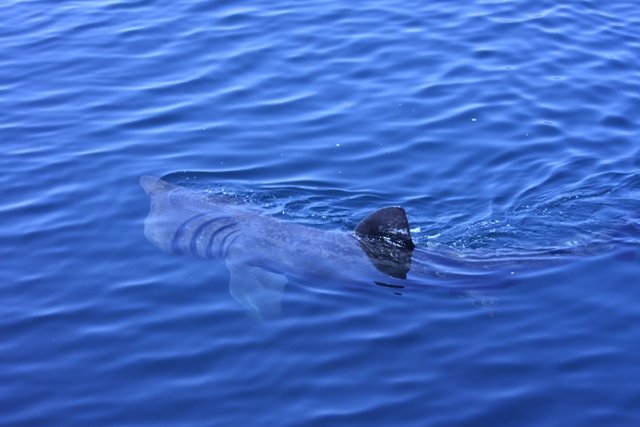
Basking shark filter feeding at Dursey Sound

The basking shark is a ram feeder, filtering zooplankton, very small fish (such as sardines, mackerels and herrings), and invertebrates from the water with its gill rakers by swimming forwards with its mouth open. A 5-metre-long (16 ft) basking shark has been calculated to filter up to 500 short tons (450 t) of water per hour swimming at an observed speed of 0.85 metres per second (3.1 km/h; 1.9 mph). Basking sharks are not indiscriminate feeders on zooplankton. Samples taken in the presence of feeding individuals recorded zooplankton densities 75% higher than adjacent non-feeding areas. Basking sharks feed preferentially in zooplankton patches dominated by small planktonic crustaceans called calanoid copepods (on average 1,700 individuals per cubic metre of water). They will also feed on copepods of the genera Pseudocalanus and Oithona. Basking sharks sometimes congregate in groups of up to 1,400 spotted along the northeastern U.S. Samples taken near feeding sharks contained 2.5 times as many Calanus helgolandicus individuals per cubic metre, which were also found to be 50% longer. Unlike the megamouth shark and whale shark, the basking shark relies only on the water it pushes through its gills by swimming; the megamouth shark and whale shark can suck or pump water through their gills.

=== Reproduction ===
Basking sharks are ovoviviparous: the developing embryos first rely on a yolk sac, with no placental connection. Their seemingly useless teeth may play a role before birth in helping them feed on the mother's unfertilized ova (a behaviour known as oophagy). In females, only the right ovary appears to function, and it is currently unknown why only one of the organs seems to function.

Gestation is thought to span over a year (perhaps two to three years), with a small, though unknown, number of young born fully developed at 1.5–2 m (4 ft 11 in – 6 ft 7 in). Only one pregnant female is known to have been caught; she was carrying six unborn young. Mating is thought to occur in early summer, and birthing in late summer, following the female's movement into shallow waters.

The age of maturity is thought to be between the ages of six and 13 and at a length of 4.6–6 m (15–20 ft). Breeding frequency is thought to be two to four years.

The exact lifespan of the basking shark is unknown, but experts estimate it to be about 50 years. The generation cycle is estimated to be 22-34 years.

== Conservation ==
Aside from direct catches, by-catches in trawl nets have been one of several threats to basking sharks. In New Zealand, basking sharks had been abundant historically; however, after the mass by-catches recorded in the 1990s and 2000s, confirmations of the species became very scarce. Management plans have been declared to promote effective conservation. In June 2018, the Department of Conservation classified the basking shark as "Threatened - Nationally Vulnerable" under the New Zealand Threat Classification System.

The eastern north Pacific Ocean population is a U.S. National Marine Fisheries Service species of concern, one of those species about which the U.S. Government's National Oceanic and Atmospheric Administration has some concerns regarding status and threats, but for which insufficient information is available to indicate a need to list the species under the U.S. Endangered Species Act (ESA).

The IUCN Red List indicates this as an endangered species.

The endangered aspect of this shark was publicized in 2005 with a postage stamp issued by Guernsey Post.

== Importance to humans ==
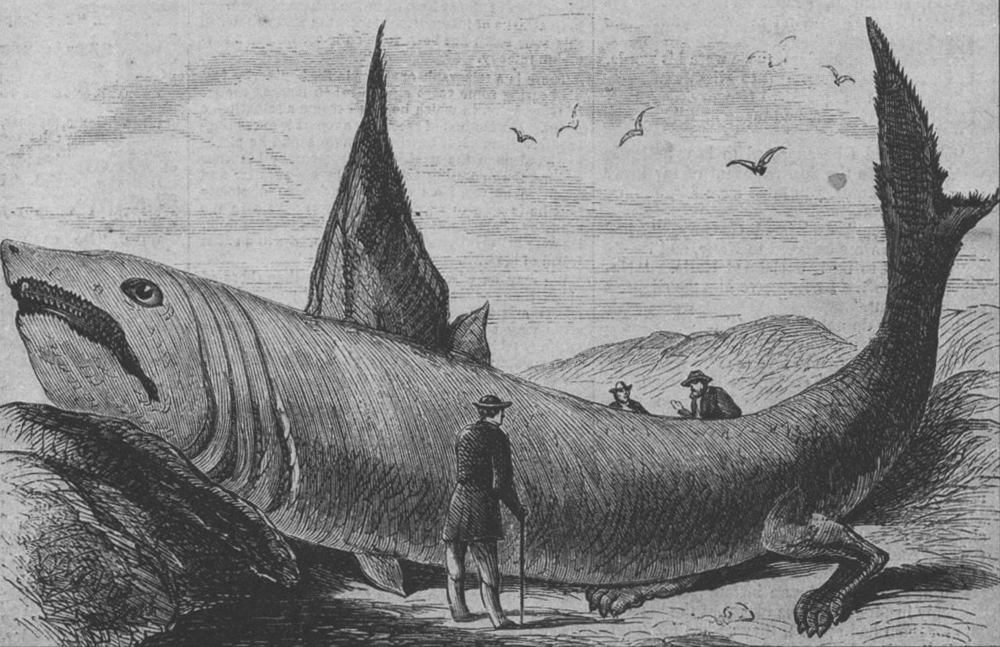
The "wonderful fish" described in Harper's Weekly on 24 October 1868, was likely the remains of a basking shark.

Historically, the basking shark has been a staple of fisheries because of its slow swimming speed, placid nature, and previously abundant numbers. Commercially, it was put to many uses: the flesh for food and fishmeal, the hide for leather, and its large liver (which has a high squalene content) for oil. It is currently fished mainly for its fins (for shark fin soup). Parts (such as cartilage) are also used in traditional Chinese medicine and as an aphrodisiac in Japan, further adding to demand.

As a result of rapidly declining numbers, the basking shark has been protected in some territorial waters and trade in its products is restricted in many countries under CITES. Among others, it is fully protected in the United Kingdom and the Atlantic and Mexican Gulf regions of the United States. Since 2008, it has been illegal to fish for, or retain if accidentally caught, basking sharks in waters of the European Union. It is partially protected in Norway and New Zealand, as targeted commercial fishing is illegal, but accidental bycatch can be used (in Norway, any basking shark caught as bycatch and still alive must be released). As of March 2010, it was also listed under Annex I of the CMS Migratory Sharks Memorandum of Understanding.

Once considered a nuisance along the Canadian Pacific coast, basking sharks were the target of a government eradication programme from 1945 to 1970. Since 1994, basking shark sightings in the area became rare, and in 2008 efforts were made to determine whether any sharks still lived in the area and monitor their potential recovery. One shark was spotted in June 2024 near Wallace Island Marine Provincial Park.

It is tolerant of boats and divers approaching it and may even circle divers, making it an important draw for dive tourism in areas where it is common.

== See also ==
- List of prehistoric cartilaginous fish
- List of threatened sharks
- Shark liver oil
