= Porth Nanven =

Bay in Cornwall, England

Coordinates: 50.117°N 5.701°W

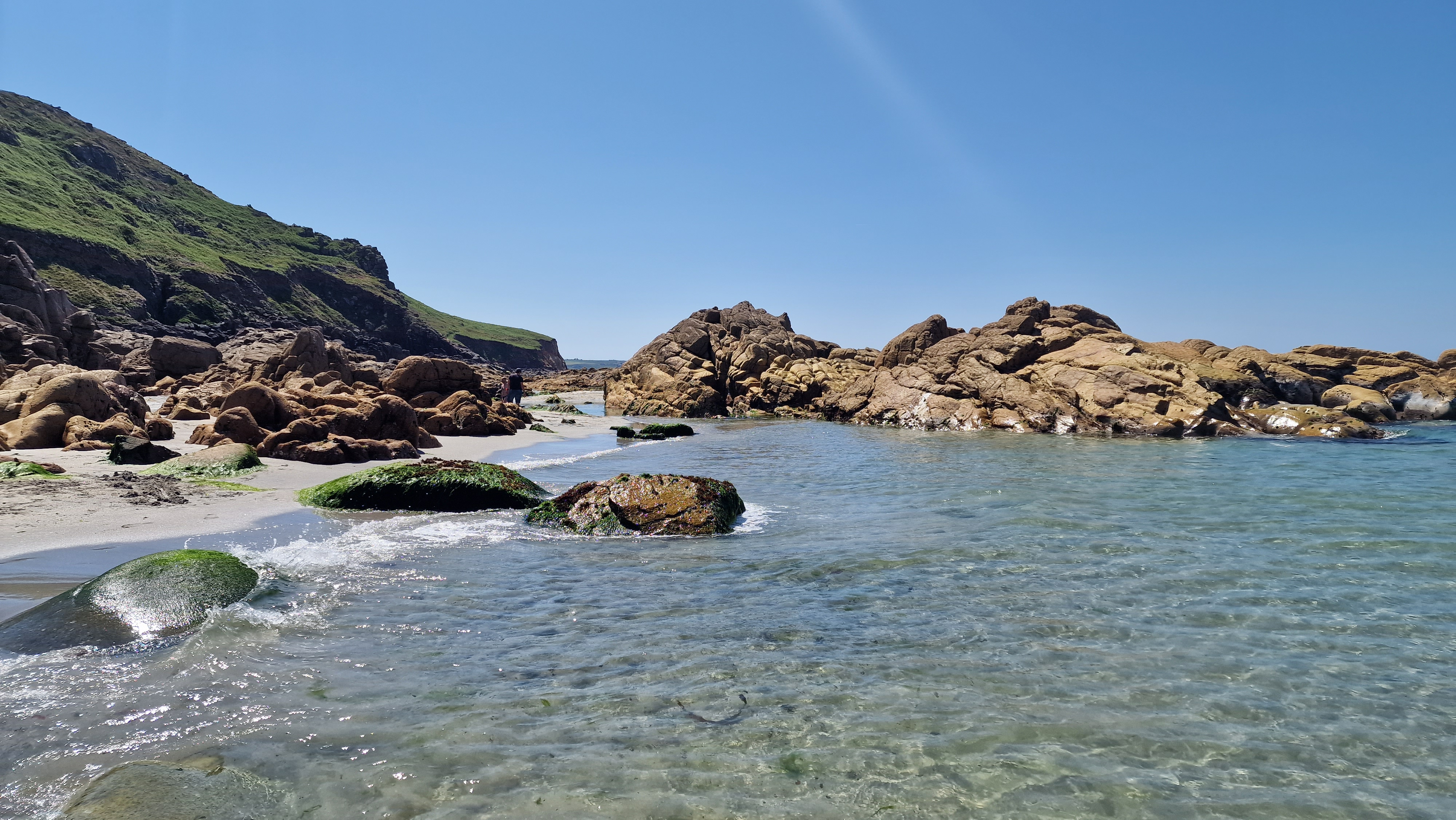
Cot Valley Beach (Porth Nanven) at low tide, near St Just, Cornwall

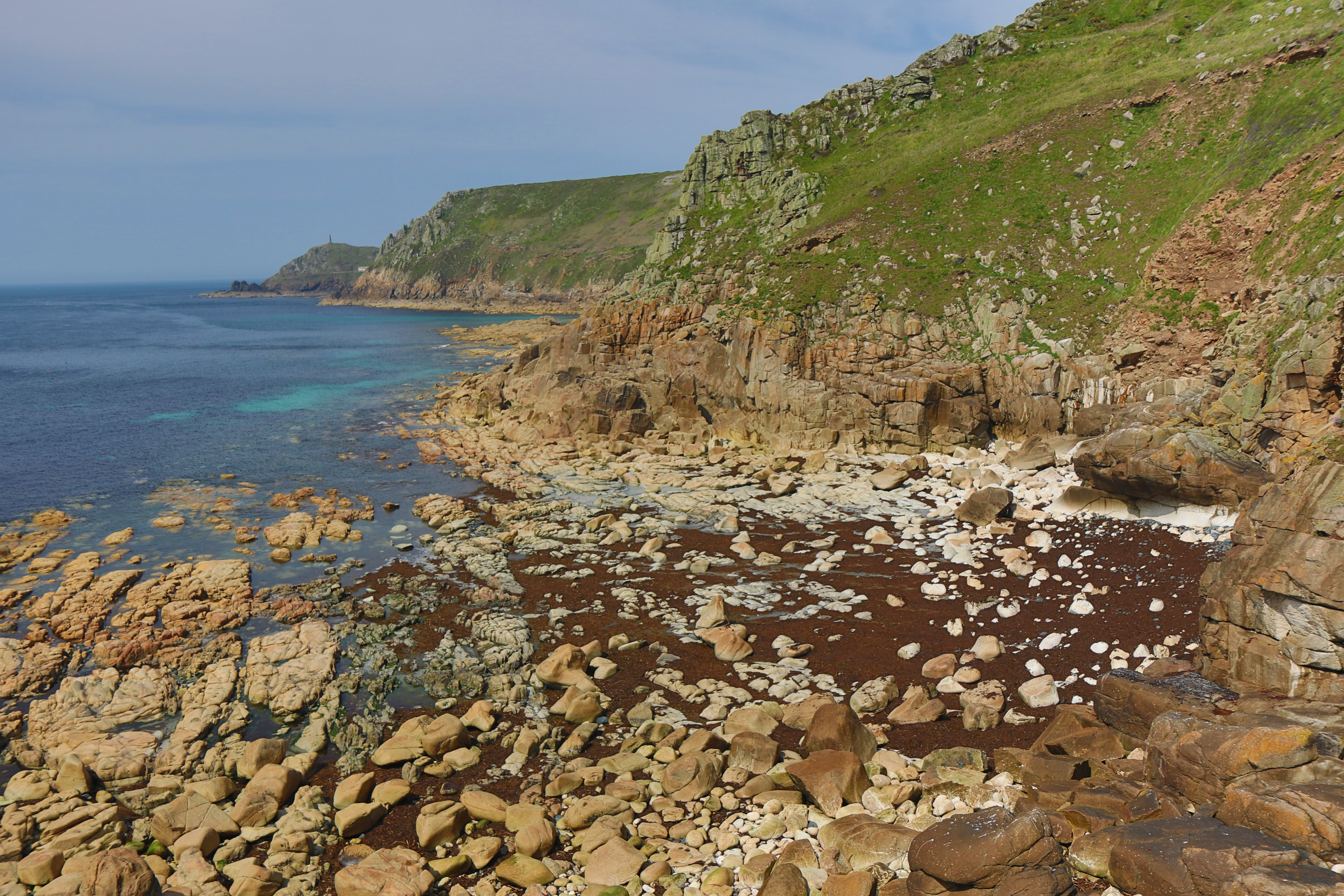
Cape Cornwall from Porth Nanven

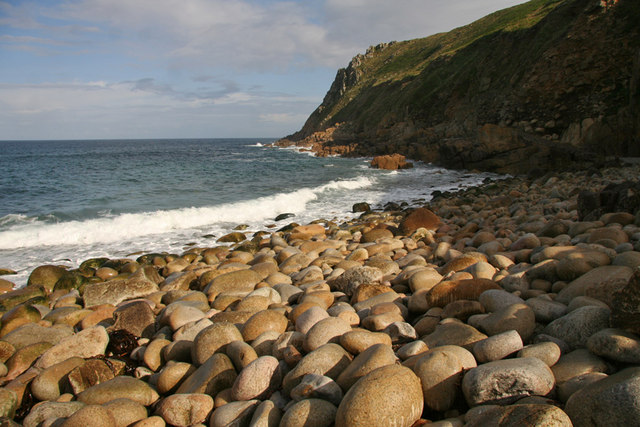
Porth Nanven beach

Porth Nanven (grid reference SW355307; most well known as Cot Valley and occasionally known as Penanwell) is a beach in the far west of Cornwall, England, United Kingdom. It is located half-a-mile west of the town of St Just.

The beach is at the seaward end of the Cot Valley and is part of the Aire Point To Carrick Du Site of Special Scientific Interest.

Porth Nanven has sometimes been referred to as 'Dinosaur Egg Beach' in the media because of a remarkable deposit of ovoid boulders covering the beach and foreshore. These boulders come in all sizes, from hen's egg to a metre or more in length, and have proved so tempting as souvenirs that they are now legally protected by the National Trust which owns the beach.

Many visitors assume that these weirdly shaped boulders are the work of the sea, which they are, but the sea of 120,000 years ago. Sea levels have changed several times since then and are now much lower, causing the ancient beach to be suspended in the cliff above the present level. Stand on the beach and look back towards the cliff, and you will see a wall of the rounded rocks waiting to break away and join those on the beach today.

Work was completed in December 2005 on diverting and treating the sewage which used to be deposited offshore here; it is now safe to swim in the cove.

Porth Nanven featured as one of the 10 Best Beaches in the UK

== Gallery of images ==
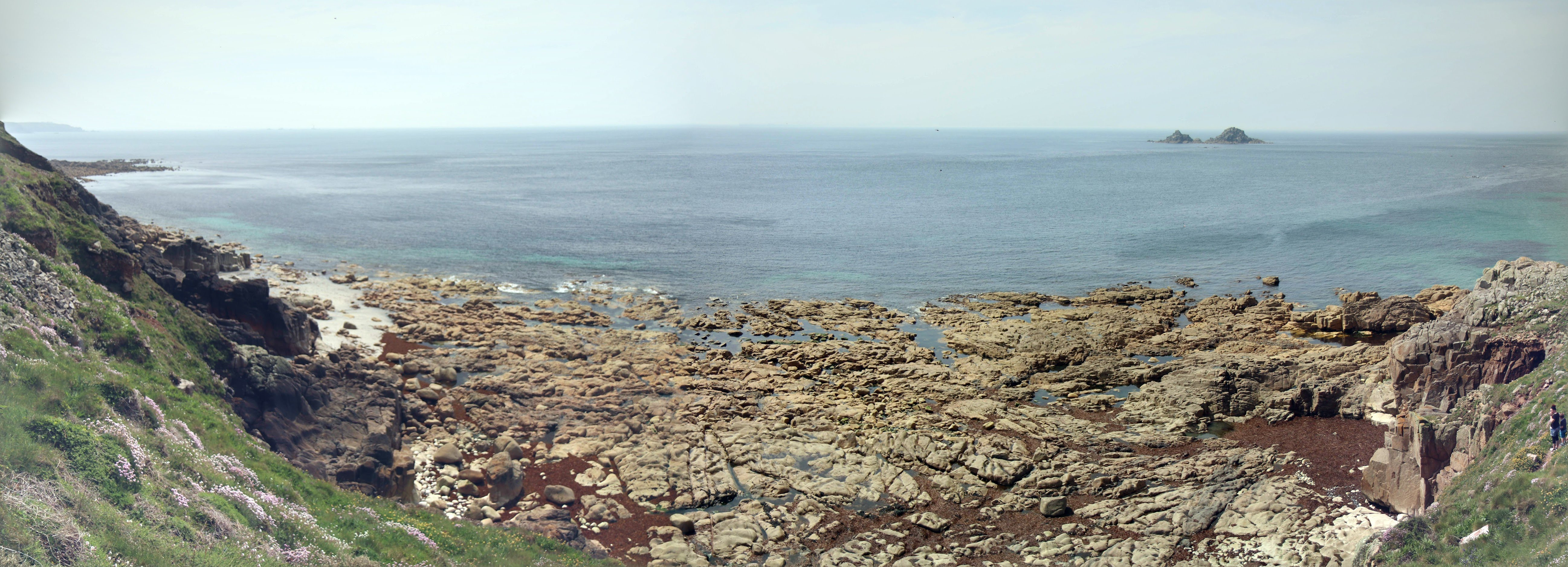
Panorama of Porth Nanven

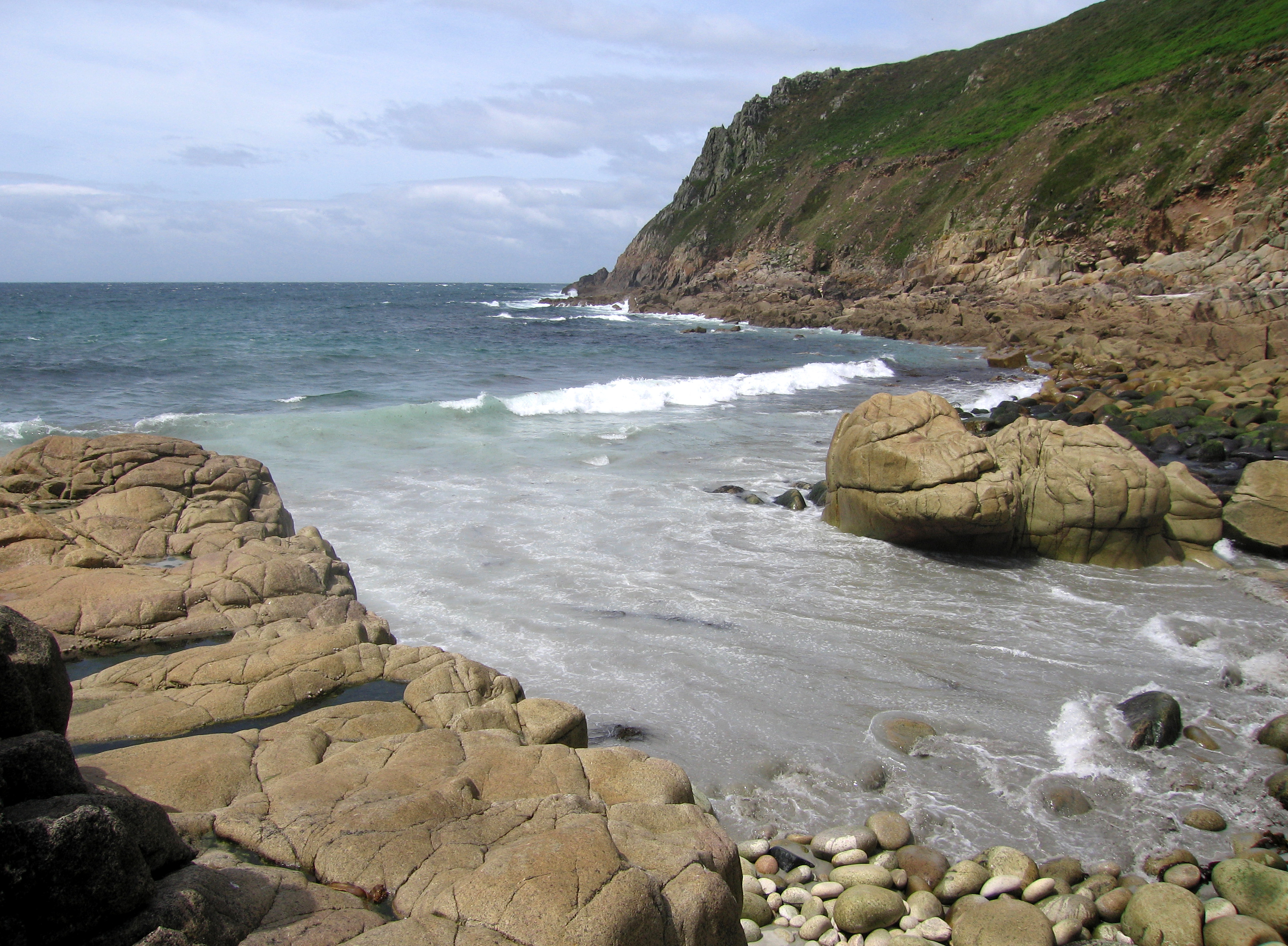
Porth Nanven where the Cot Valley meets the sea

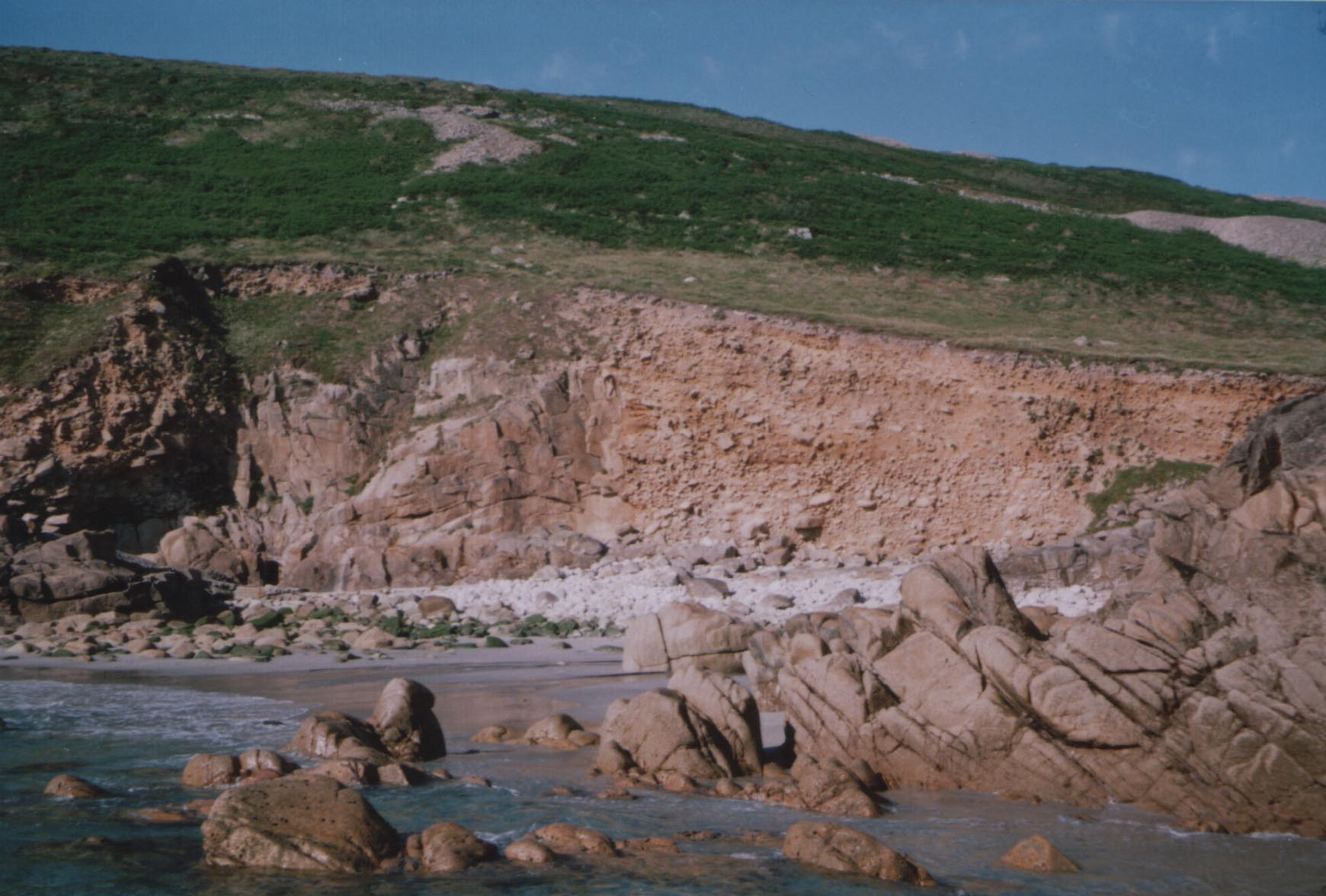
Porth Nanven looking inland

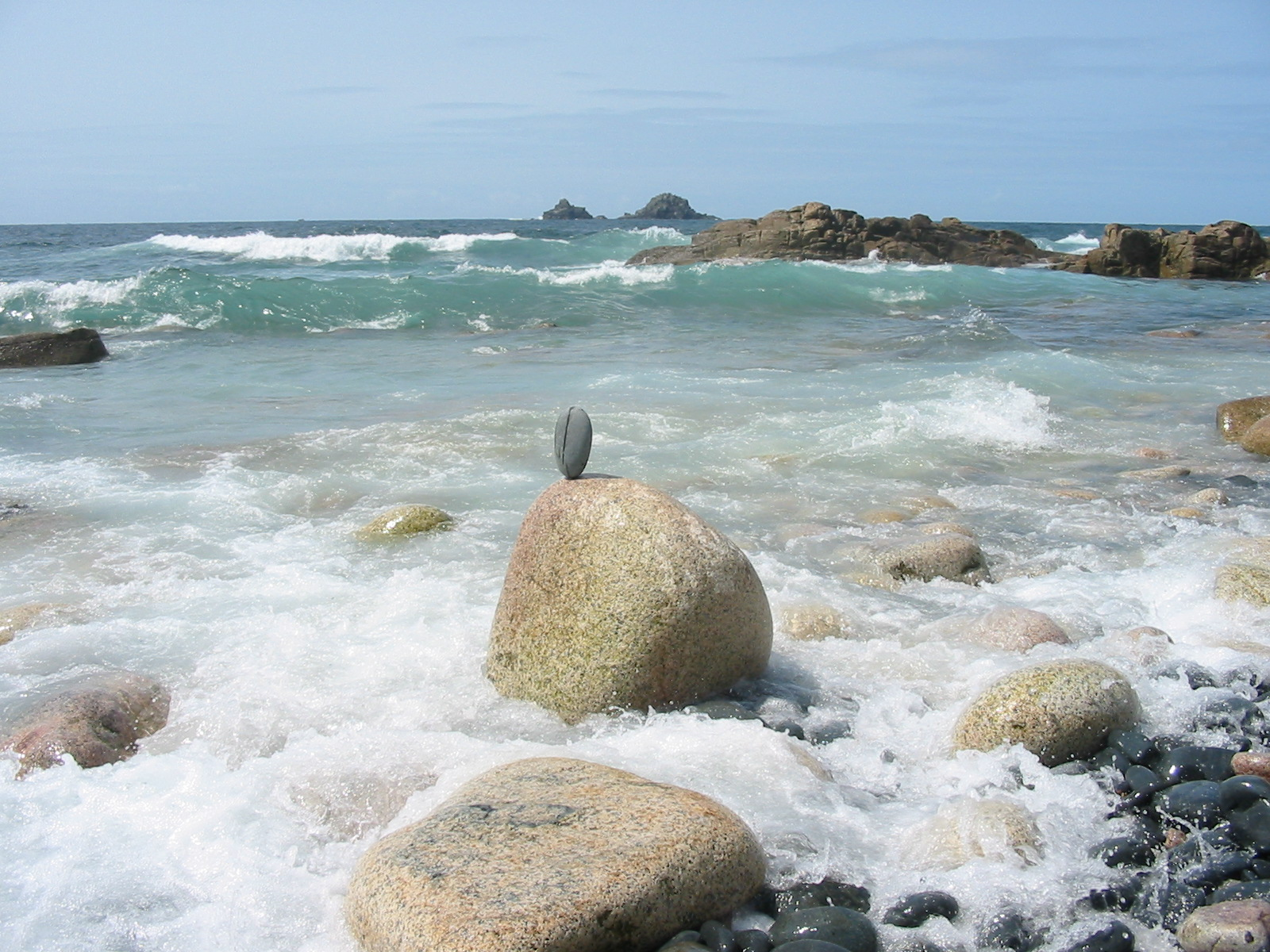
Nanven Beach with The Brisons on the horizon

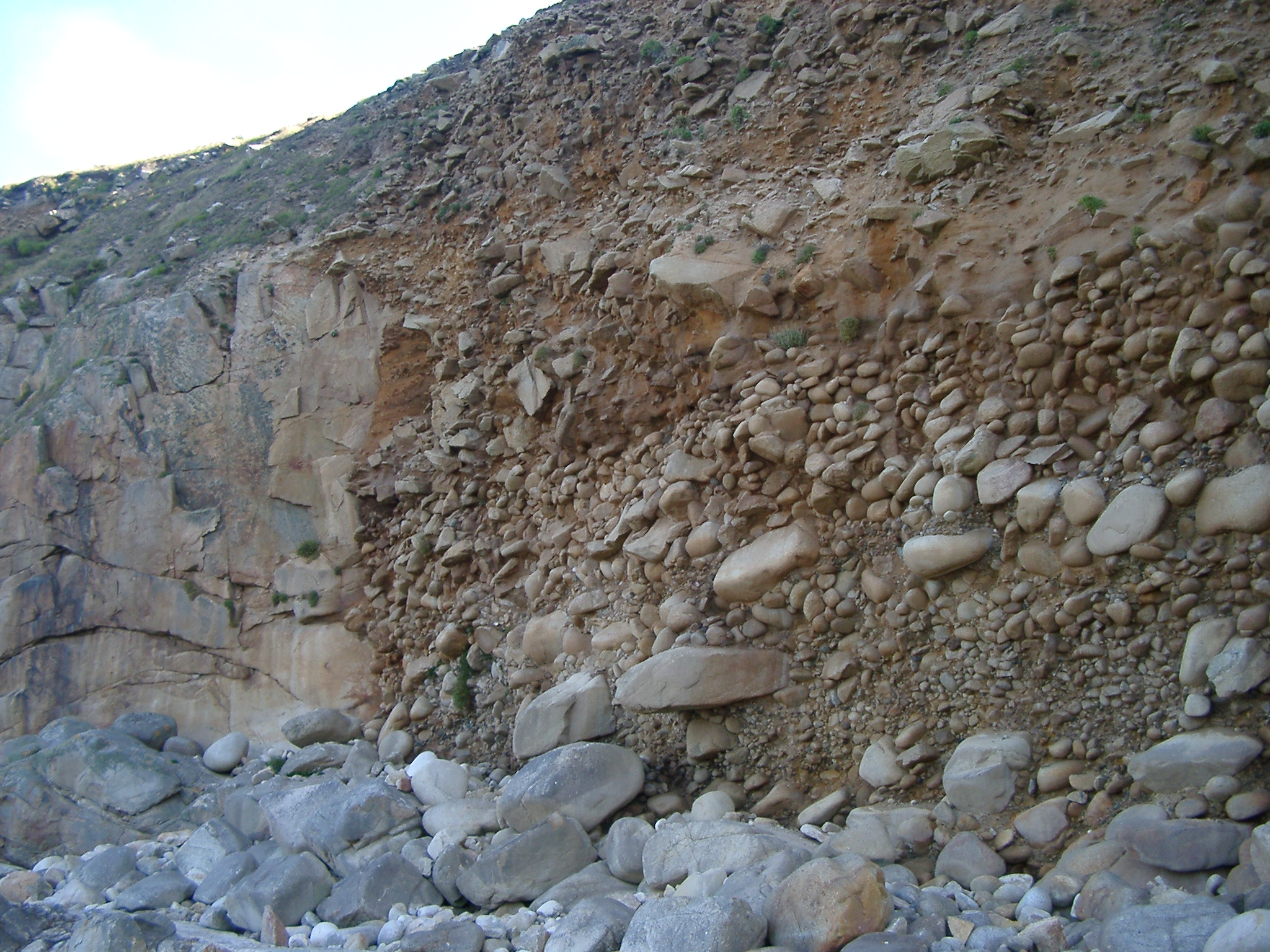
Above the current beach (rounded rocks) can be seen a layer of pebbles from about 120,000 years ago. Above them are head deposits, angular pieces from 100,000 to 20,000 years ago
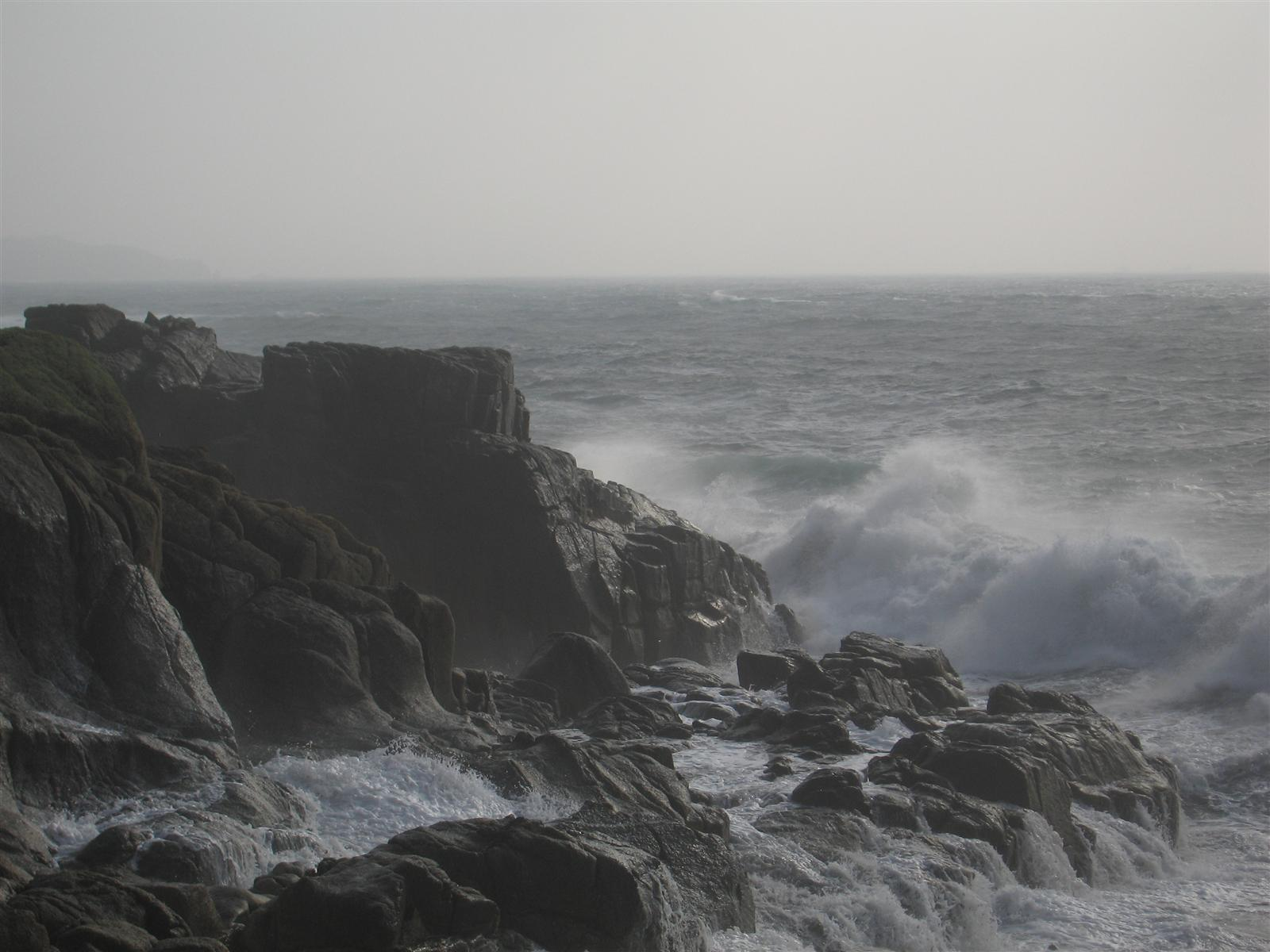

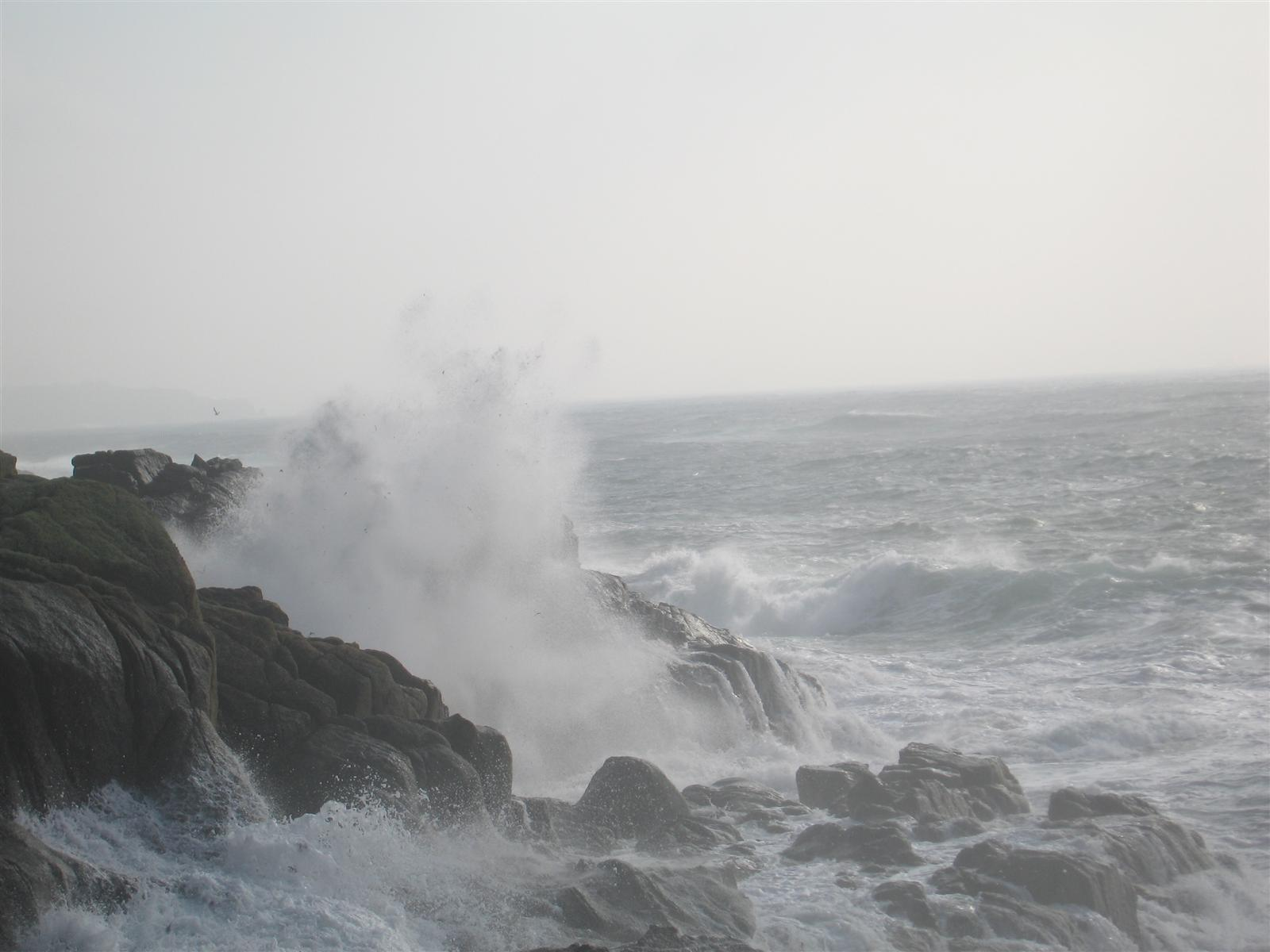

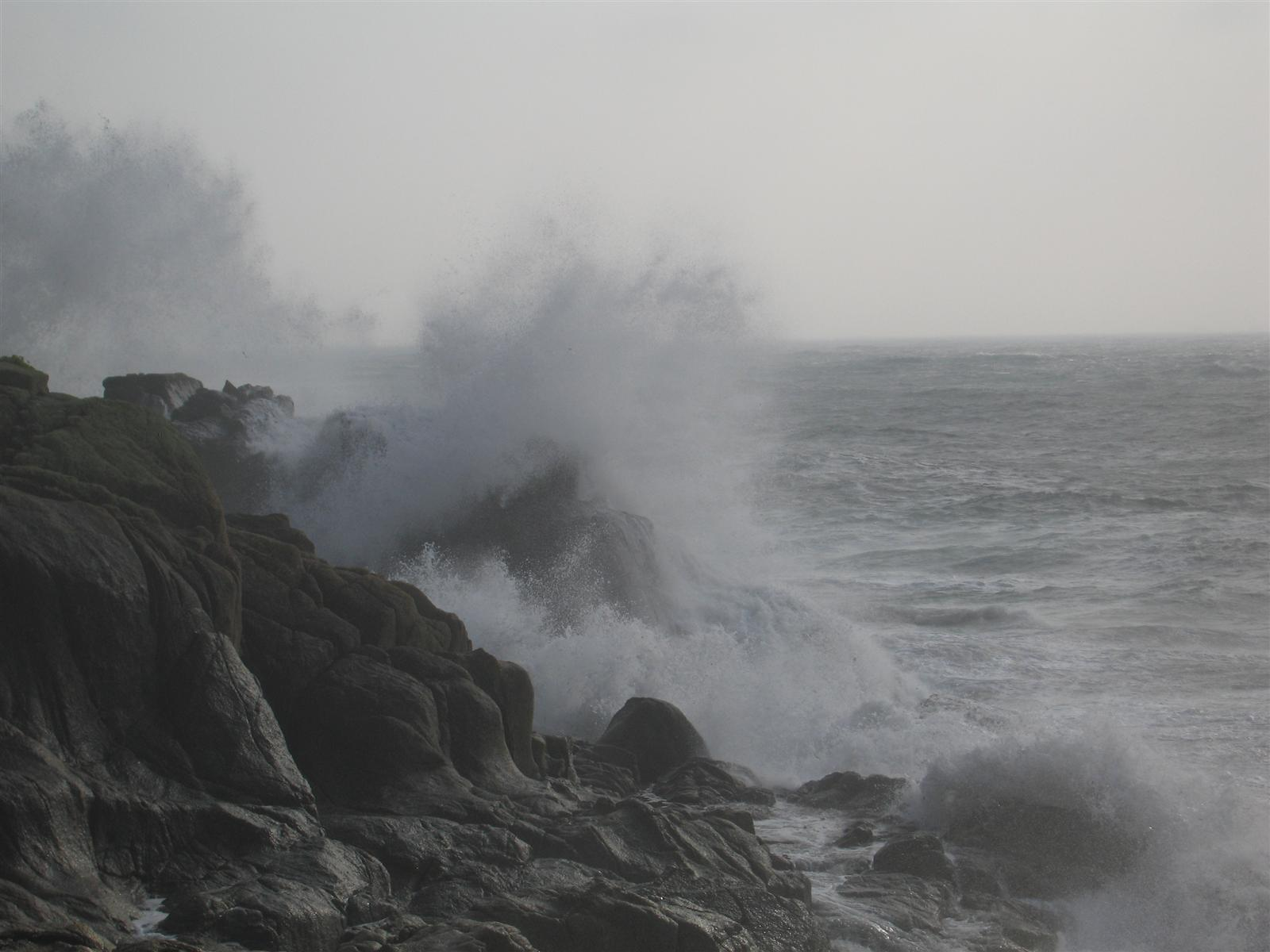

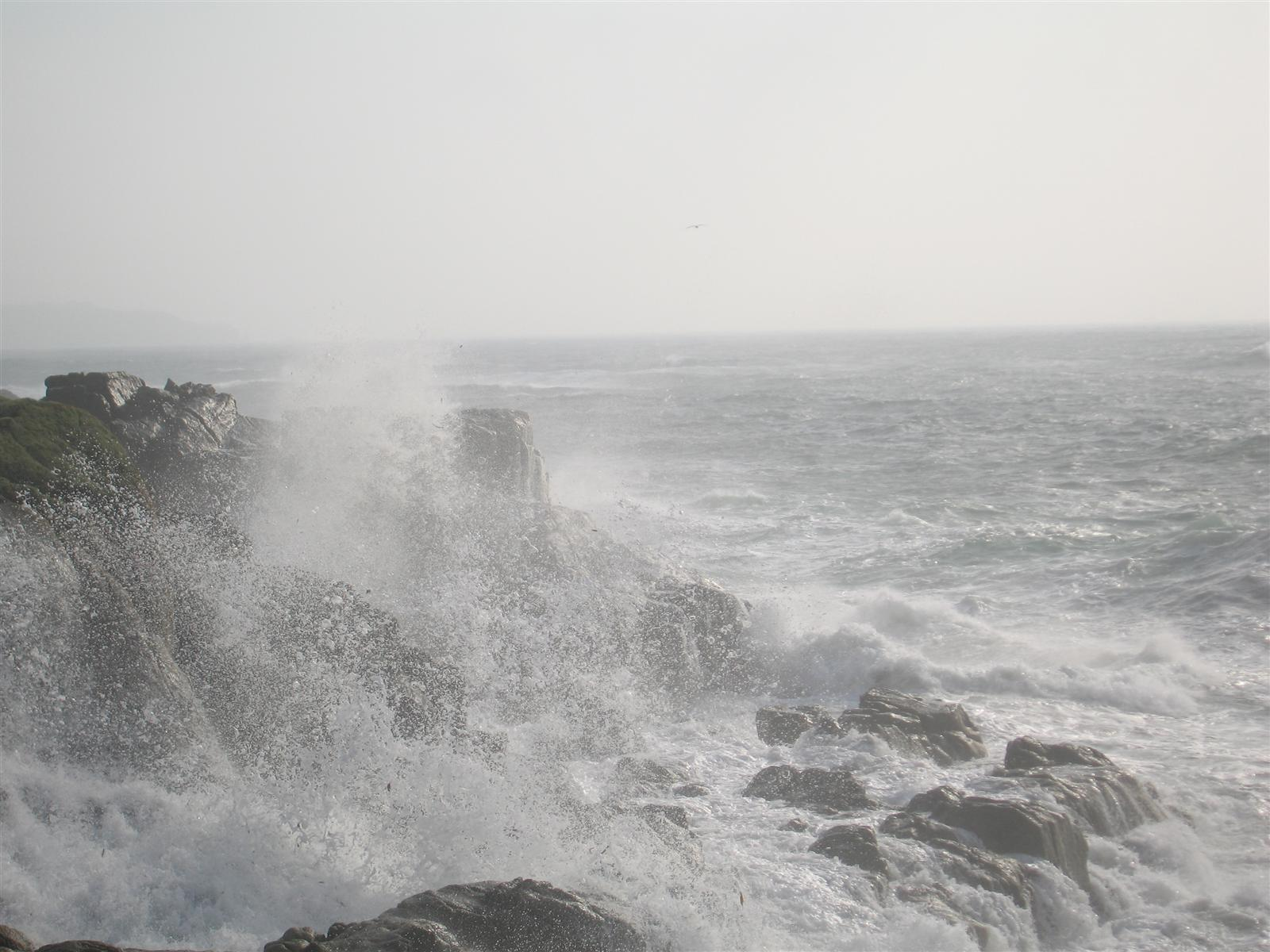

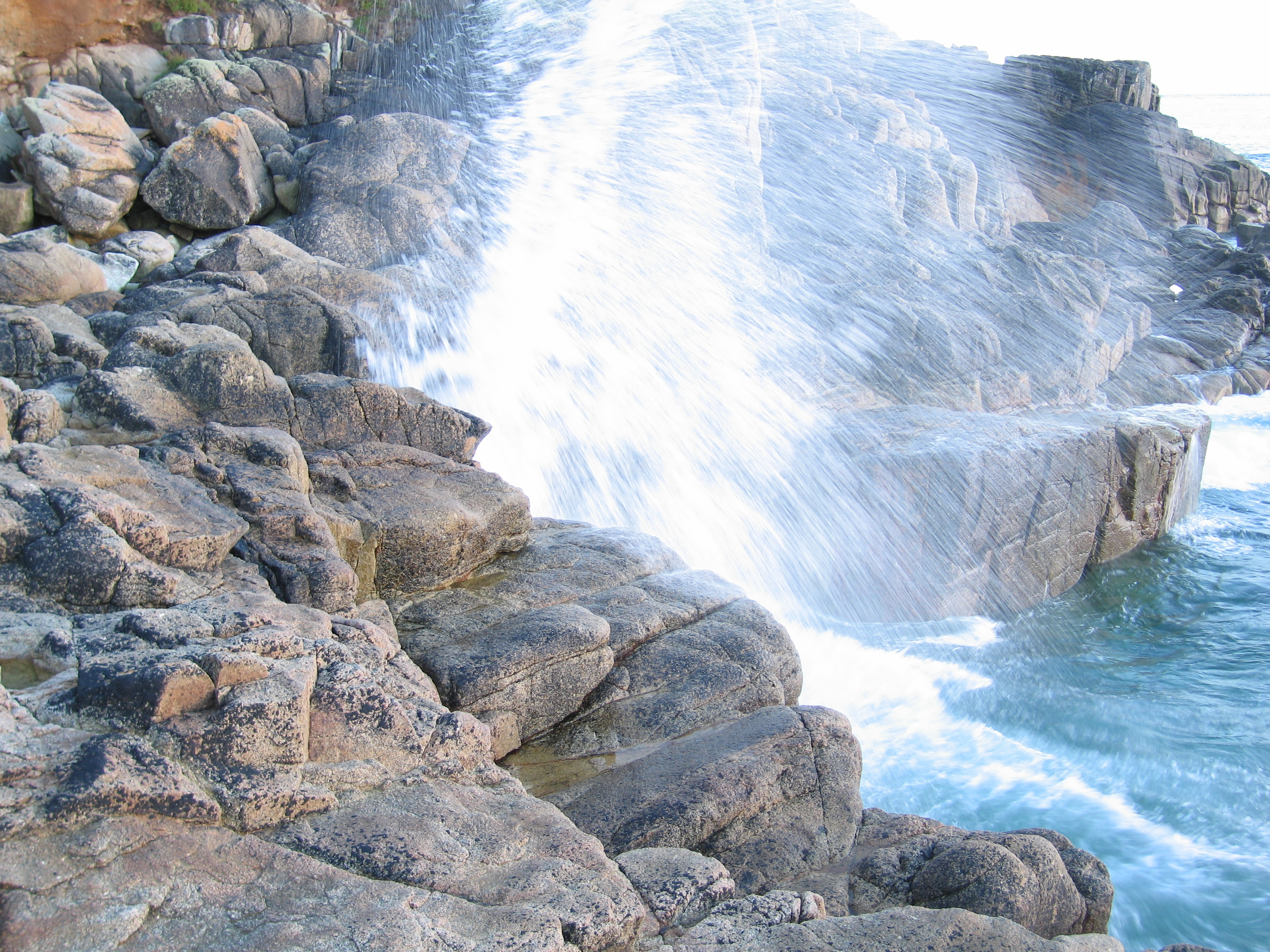
