= Zuiyo-maru carcass =

Basking shark corpse caught in 1977

Carcass caught by the Zuiyō Maru.

The Zuiyo-maru carcass (ニューネッシー, Nyū Nesshii; literally "New Nessie") was a corpse, caught by the Japanese fishing trawler Zuiyō Maru (瑞洋丸) off the coast of New Zealand in 1977. The carcass's peculiar appearance resulted in speculation that it might be the remains of a sea serpent or prehistoric plesiosaur.

Although several scientists insisted it was "not a fish, whale, or any other mammal", analysis of amino acids in the corpse's muscle tissue later indicated it was most likely the carcass of a basking shark. Decomposing basking shark carcasses lose most of the lower head area and the dorsal and caudal fins first, making them resemble a plesiosaur.

== Discovery ==
On April 25, 1977, the Japanese trawler Zuiyō Maru, fishing east of Christchurch, New Zealand, caught a strange, unknown creature in the trawl. The crew was convinced it was an unidentified animal, but despite the potential biological significance of the curious discovery, the captain, Akira Tanaka, decided to dump the carcass into the ocean again so not to risk spoiling the fish caught. However, before that was done, some photos and sketches were taken of the creature, nicknamed "Nessie" by the crew, measurements were taken and some samples of skeleton, skin and fins were collected for further analysis by experts in Japan (later the shipping company ordered all its boats to try to relocate the dumped corpse, but without apparent success). The discovery resulted in immense commotion and a "plesiosaur-craze" in Japan.

== Description ==
The foul-smelling, decomposing corpse reportedly weighed 1,800 kg and was about 10 m long. According to the crew, the creature had a 1.5-m-long neck, four large, reddish fins, and a tail about 2.0 m long. It seemed to lack a dorsal fin on inspection, but one was visible from photographs. No internal organs remained as the chest cavity and gut had opened from decay, but flesh and fat were somewhat intact.

== Proposed explanations ==
=== Plesiosaur ===
Professor Tokio Shikama from Yokohama National University was convinced the remains were of a plesiosaur, a creature believed by scientists to be long extinct. Dr. Fujiro Yasuda from Tokyo University of Marine Science and Technology agreed with Shikama, "the photographs show the remains of a prehistoric animal". Dr. Fujiro Yasuda summarizes his observations in newsreel from the time of the discovery. Yasuda and Taki, ichthyologists, disputed that the cryptid could be a shark which would necessitate Michihiko Yano was mistaken when he claimed to observe two dorsal fins.

However, other scientists were more skeptical. According to Bengt Sjögren, Swedish paleontologist Hans-Christian Bjerring was soon interviewed by Swedish news agency Tidningarnas Telegrambyrå, and said:

"If it's true that the Japanese collected samples of fins and skin, it would be possible to conclude from a microscope what it is. If it would be shown to be a hitherto unknown animal from the sea, it is as big of a sensation as the discovery of the coelacanth in 1938… but there is reason to be suspicious of the claims of plesiosaurs, for example, as the marine environment and fauna changed drastically since the age of the plesiosaurs on earth."

Another Swedish scientist, Ove Persson, was also critical of the plesiosaur interpretation. He recalled other discoveries of similar dead marine creatures resembling plesiosaurs that on closer inspection revealed them to be just decomposed, unusually large sharks. He also added, "The discovery of the coelacanth was not as strange as if a plesiosaur would be discovered. The plesiosaur is much bigger and breathes with lungs. It seems incredible that it would manage to remain hidden."

=== Basking shark ===
A team of Japanese scientists (Tadayoshi Sasaki and Shigeru Kimura from the Tokyo University of Marine Science and Technology, Ikuo Obata from the National Museum of Nature and Science), and Toshio Ikuya from the Atmosphere and Ocean Research Institute at the University of Tokyo issued a joint conclusion. While they said the identity of the carcass could not be determined with certainty, the carcass was most likely that of a basking shark or some species closely related.

On July 28, 1977, the Zuiyō Maru carcass was commented upon in the international science magazine New Scientist. A scientist from the Natural History Museum in London had the same opinion as Bjerring and Persson, that the remains were not from a plesiosaur. The decomposition pattern of a basking shark, whose spine and brain case is relatively highly calcified for a cartilaginous fish, can be expected to produce a similar shape to a plesiosaur. The first parts that fall off a basking shark during decomposition are the lower jaw, the gill area, and the dorsal and caudal fins. Of the view that the carcass was explained as a plesiosaur, Sjögren concluded, "it was the infamous old 'Stronsay Beast' that once again haunted like on innumerable other occasions. The scholars in Japan went into the same easy trap as the Scottish naturalists did in the 19th century."

The identity as a basking shark was further supported by the proportions given by Michihiko Yano when he measured the carcass before it was put back to sea. His dimensions giving a much longer tail than neck, proportions of the hind and forward fins, and size of the "head" do not closely correspond to any known plesiosaur or pliosaur, but did perfectly match the expected body dimensions for a large basking shark. Closer review of the photographs taken of the carcass also do show the presence of a dorsal fin, which was speculated to have been overlooked due to decomposition. The cartilaginous fibers visible in the fin are only found in fish and are unknown in any tetrapod.

== In popular culture ==
Despite multiple investigations concluding that the carcass pulled up by the Zuiyō Maru was probably the remains of a large shark, most appearances in popular fiction either neglect to state this fact and instead either leave the identity ambiguous, or ignore it in favor of declaring the remains that of a genuine plesiosaur.

- The carcass is referenced in the 1991 movie Godzilla vs. King Ghidorah, but acknowledged as a plesiosaur in support for the idea that Godzilla could have been a dinosaur species which survived into modern times before being irradiated into the monster it became known as.
- The 1988 novel Tōi Umi kara Kita Coo (Coo: Come From a Distant Ocean Coo) and subsequent 1993 anime adaptation bring up the Zuiyō Maru photographs. When a fresh plesiosaur carcass washes ashore near Fiji, a character looks up the Zuiyō Maru photographs as a prior instance hinting that the marine reptiles are still alive. This leads into a plot of a nefarious group actively trying to hide the continued existence of such creatures.
- An unused opening for The Lost World: Jurassic Park was to feature a Japanese fishing boat accidentally hauling up the badly decomposed remains of a Parasaurolophus, revealing that genetically engineered dinosaurs continued to survive past the end of Jurassic Park. The scene was inspired by the Zuiyō Maru incident.
- In the 1998 OVA movie Tekken: The Motion Picture, the decomposing corpse of a genetically engineered Deinonychus is caught in a fishing boat's net, alerting Interpol to genetic experiments occurring on a remote island. The imagery is done as a homage to the Zuiyō Maru incident.
- The carcass is also mentioned in the credits of the 2014 movie Godzilla.
- The plesiosaur argument is used as the basis of the television series Lost Tapes' episode "Monster of Monterey", in which a similar creature lives in the Monterey Canyon off the coast of California and is suggested as being responsible for a number of deaths.
- In the 2005 movie documentary, Monsters of the Deep, moviemaker Bryan Bruce explores the myth and reality of the stories of huge sea creatures, including that of the Zuiyō Maru.

== See also ==
- Basking shark
- Globster
- Stronsay beast
