= Megachasma applegatei =

Megachasma applegatei Temporal range: Chattian–Aquitanian

Scientific classification
- Domain: Eukaryota
- Kingdom: Animalia
- Phylum: Chordata
- Class: Chondrichthyes
- Subclass: Elasmobranchii
- Division: Selachii
- Order: Lamniformes
- Family: Megachasmidae
- Genus: Megachasma
- Species: †M. applegatei

Binomial name
- †Megachasma applegatei Shimada, Welton and Long, 2014

Extinct species of shark

Megachasma applegatei is an extinct species of megamouth shark from the Oligocene to early Miocene (28-23 Mya) of the Western United States. The type fossil was discovered in the San Joaquin Valley in 1973, but only described in 2014, when the species was named after its discoverer, Shelton Applegate.

== Description ==
Megachasma applegatei is only known from isolated teeth. Based on comparison with the teeth of the recent species (Megachasma pelagios), it was approximately 6 m long and, like modern megamouth sharks, probably fed on fish and small planktonic invertebrates both in deep and shallow water habitats. Its teeth had shorter crowns and a pair of side cusplets. The teeth were also more variable in shape than the modern megamouth's, and may have been arranged in the distinctive heterodont "lamnoid tooth pattern" seen in predatory lamniform sharks.
