= Commitments of Traders =

Weekly U.S. futures market report

The Commitments of Traders is a weekly market report issued by the Commodity Futures Trading Commission (CFTC) enumerating the holdings of participants in various futures markets in the United States. It is collated by the CFTC from submissions from traders in the market and covers positions in futures on grains, cattle, financial instruments, metals, petroleum and other commodities. The exchanges that trade futures are primarily based in Chicago and New York.

The Commodity Futures Trading Commission (CFTC) releases a new report every Friday at 3:30 p.m. Eastern Time, and the report reflects the commitments of traders on the prior Tuesday. The weekly Commitments of Traders report is sometimes abbreviated as "CoT" or "COT."

The report was first published in June 1962, but versions of the report can be traced back to as early as 1924 when the U.S. Department of Agriculture’s Grain Futures Administration started regularly publishing a Commitments of Traders report.

== Methodology ==
The weekly report details trader positions in most of the futures contract markets in the United States. Data for the report is required by the CFTC from traders in markets that have 20 or more traders holding positions large enough to meet the reporting level established by the CFTC for each of those markets.^{1} These data are gathered from schedules electronically submitted each week to the CFTC by market participants listing their position in any market for which they meet the reporting criteria.

The report provides a breakdown of aggregate positions held by three different types of traders: “commercial traders,” “non-commercial traders” and "nonreportable." “Commercial traders” are sometimes called “hedgers”, “non-commercial traders” are sometimes known as “large speculators,” and the “nonreportable” group is sometimes called “small speculators.”

As one would expect, the largest positions are held by commercial traders who provide a commodity or instrument to the market or have bought a contract to take delivery of it. Thus, as a general rule, more than half the open interest in most of these markets is held by commercial traders. There is also participation in these markets by speculators who are not able to deliver on the contract or who have no need for the underlying commodity or instrument. They are buying or selling only to speculate that they will exit their position at a profit, and plan to close their long or short position before the contract becomes due. In most of these markets, the majority of the open interest in these "speculator" positions is held by traders whose positions are large enough to meet reporting requirements.

The remainder of holders of contracts in these futures markets, other than "commercial" and "large speculator" traders, are referred to by the CFTC as “nonreportable.” This is because they don’t meet the position size that requires reporting to the CFTC. (Thus, they are “small speculators.”) The “nonreportable” open interest in a futures market is determined by subtracting the open interest of the “commercial traders” plus “non-commercial traders” from the total open interest in that market. As a rule, the aggregate of all traders’ positions reported to the CFTC represents 70 to 90 percent of the total open interest in any given market.^{2}

Since 1995, the Commitments of Traders report includes holdings of options as well as futures contracts.

== Purposes and uses ==
Many speculative traders use the Commitments of Traders report to help them decide whether or not to take a long or short position. One theory is that "small speculators" are generally wrong and that the best position is contrary to the net non-reportable position. Another theory is that commercial traders understand their market the best and taking their position has a better chance of profit (which is pretty much the same thing as the "small speculators" being wrong).

== See also ==
- Economic indicator
- Technical indicator
- Market trend
