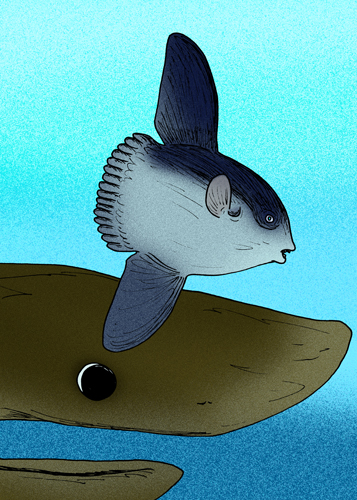
- Restoration, with Austromola

Scientific classification
- Kingdom: Animalia
- Phylum: Chordata
- Class: Chondrichthyes
- Subclass: Elasmobranchii
- Division: Selachii
- Order: Lamniformes
- Family: Cetorhinidae
- Genus: †Keasius; Welton, 2013

Type species
- †Keasius taylori Welton, 2013

Other species
- †Keasius parvus (Leriche, 1908); †Keasius septemtrionalis Reinecke, von der Hocht, & Dufraing, 2015; †Keasius rhenanus Reinecke, von der Hocht, & Dufraing, 2015

Synonyms
- Genus synonymy: "Praecetorhinus" von der Hocht, 1978 (nomen nudum); Species synonymy: K. parvus; Cetorhinus parvus Leriche, 1908

= Keasius =

Keasius Temporal range: 41.2–11.63 Ma Middle Eocene–Middle Miocene

Extinct genus of sharks

Keasius is an extinct genus of basking sharks that lived during the Cenozoic. It contains four valid species, which have been found in North America, Europe, and Antarctica.

== Palaeobiology ==
A 2026 study analyzed a regurgitalite produced by either a lamniform or a hexanchid shark which contained remains attibuted to K. cf. septemtrionalis from the Miocene (Burdigalian) of Slovenia, extending it's known range to the southeastern central paratethys ocean.
