= Cot (surname) =

Cot is a surname. Notable people with the surname include:

- Jean-Pierre Cot (born 1937), French professor and judge
- Pierre Cot (1895–1977), French politician
- Pierre Auguste Cot (1837–1883), French painter of the Academic Classicism school
