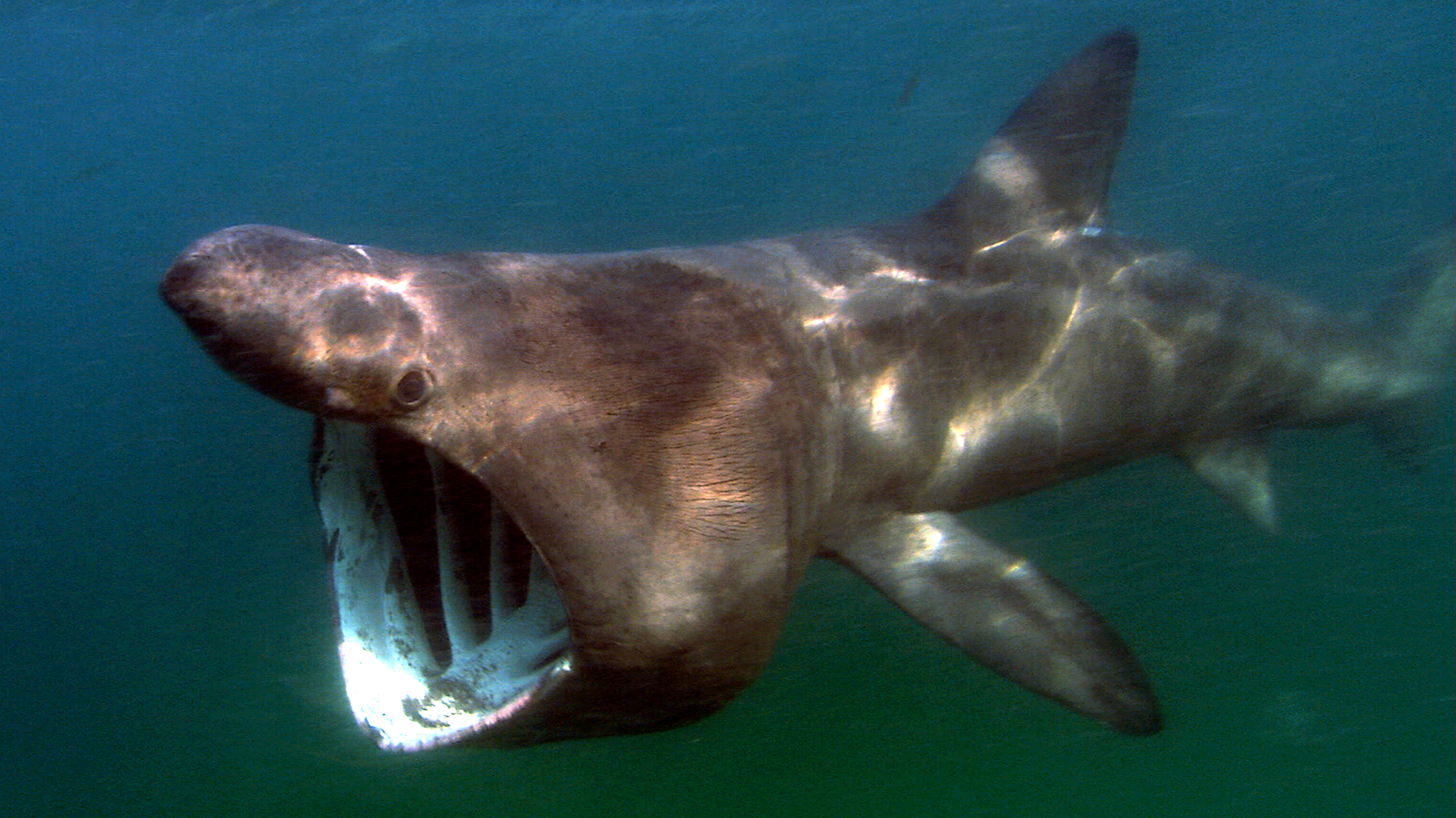
- Cetorhinus maximus

Scientific classification
- Kingdom: Animalia
- Phylum: Chordata
- Class: Chondrichthyes
- Subclass: Elasmobranchii
- Division: Selachii
- Order: Lamniformes
- Family: Cetorhinidae; Gill, 1861

Genera
- †Caucasochasma; †Pseudocetorhinus; Cetorhinus; †Keasius

Synonyms
- Halsydridae Whitley, 1934

= Cetorhinidae =

Cetorhinidae Temporal range: 41.2–0 Ma Middle Eocene–present

Family of sharks

Cetorhinidae is a family of filter feeding mackerel sharks, whose members are commonly known as basking sharks. It includes the extant basking shark, Cetorhinus, as well as three extinct genera, Pseudocetorhinus, Caucasochasma and Keasius.
