= List of Kansas State University people =

The following is a list of notable people associated with Kansas State University, whose main campus is located in the American city of Manhattan, Kansas.

== University presidents ==
Since 1863, 15 men (and no women) have served as president of Kansas State University (or its predecessor institutions). The most recent officeholder is Richard Linton, the 15th president who has been serving since 2022.

== Alumni ==
=== Academia ===
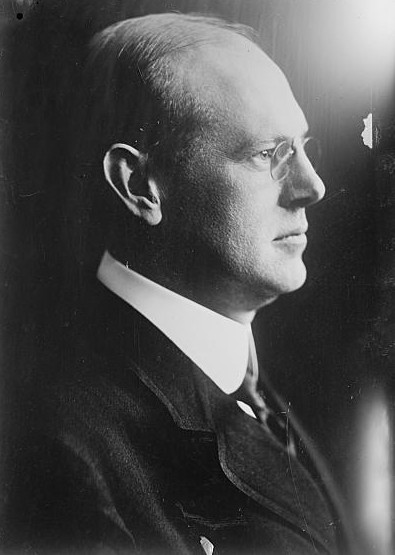
Ernest Fox Nichols

- Anna Estelle Arnold (1879–1942) – school teacher, administrator, textbook publisher
- Erle Bartley – professor (1949–1983); developed widely used preventative for ruminal tympany (ruminant bloat)
- May Louise Cowles – researcher and nationwide advocate of home economics study
- Kenneth S. Davis – historian, professor, nominated for National Book Award
- Milton S. Eisenhower – former president of Kansas State, Penn State, and Johns Hopkins universities; brother of Dwight D. Eisenhower
- Louis Edwin Fry Sr. (1903–2000) (B.S. 1927, M.S. 1929) – architect, professor; former chair of the department of architecture at Howard University
- Leon Quincy Jackson (1926/1927–1995) (M.S. 1954) – architect, professor at Tennessee State University, and an early African American architect in Oklahoma and Tennessee
- Charlotte P. Morris (PhD) – interim president of Tuskegee University (2010; 2017–2018)
- Ernest Fox Nichols – physicist, president of Dartmouth College (1909–16) and MIT (1921–23)
- Michael O'Donnell – professor, researcher on adolescent wellness
- George P. "Bud" Peterson – president of the Georgia Institute of Technology (2009–present); chancellor of the University of Colorado-Boulder (2006–09)
- Imam Prasodjo – professor at the University of Indonesia
- John Brooks Slaughter – chancellor of University System of Maryland (1982–88), president of Occidental College (1988–99), director of the National Science Foundation
- Helen B. Thompson (1875–1969) – home economist, professor emeritus at University of California, Los Angeles; Thompson Hall on the Kansas State Agricultural College campus is named in her honor
- Jackie Vietti – president of Butler Community College for 17 years; interim president of Emporia State University in 2015

=== Arts and media ===
- Kirstie Alley – actress (Cheers, Veronica's Closet, Fat Actress); winner of two Emmy Awards
- Craig Bolerjack – announcer on NFL on CBS; Utah Jazz television announcer
- Charles L. Brainard – architect; active in preserving the papers of Dwight D. Eisenhower and establishing the Dwight D. Eisenhower Presidential Library, Museum and Boyhood Home
- Jane Butel – cookbook author; founder of the Jane Butel Cooking School
- Bill Buzenberg – journalist; executive director of Center for Public Integrity; former vice-president of news at NPR
- Del Close – actor, improviser, writer; co-founder of I.O. theatre in Chicago and one of premier influences on modern improvisational theater
- Lucinda Dickey – actress (Breakin', Breakin' 2: Electric Boogaloo), former Solid Gold dancer
- Roy M. Fisher – journalist; former editor-in-chief of Chicago Daily News
- Gail Gregg – artist
- Eddie Griffin – comedian
- Mitch Holthus – radio voice of Kansas City Chiefs
- Nathan Johnson – modernist architect in Detroit
- Gordon Jump – actor (WKRP in Cincinnati, "Maytag Man")
- Charles Melton – actor
- Virgil Miller – film special effects pioneer; Academy Award nominee
- Clementine Paddleford – journalist and food writer; declared by Time magazine in 1953 as the "best known food editor in the United States"
- Darcy Pattison – writer of children's literature, blogger, writing teacher and indie publisher
- Steve Pepoon – TV writer/producer; Emmy winner, The Simpsons
- Steve Physioc – broadcaster for the Kansas City Royals
- Keylee Sue Sanders – television fashion consultant; former Miss Teen USA; pageant organizer
- Lawrence M. Schoen – science fiction author
- Mark Schultz – musician
- Kevin Warren Sloan – student athlete; landscape architect, urban planner and writer
- Crystal Smith – model, actress, and Playboy centerfold
- Pete Souza – photojournalist and official White House photographer (1983–1989); chief White House photographer (2009–2017)
- Eric Stonestreet – actor (Modern Family), Emmy Award winner
- Theresa Vail – Miss Kansas 2013
- Jerry Wexler – record producer; enshrined in Rock and Roll Hall of Fame

==== English/creative writing ====
- Traci Brimhall – Kansas Poet Laureate
- Derick Burleson – poet
- Frank Marshall Davis – poet; journalist; editor of several African-American newspapers
- Darren DeFrain – fiction writer
- Taylor Mali – slam poet
- Claude McKay – poet influential during Harlem Renaissance
- Debra Monroe – fiction writer
- Bryan Penberthy – poet
- Kevin Rabas – poet
- Ed Skoog – poet

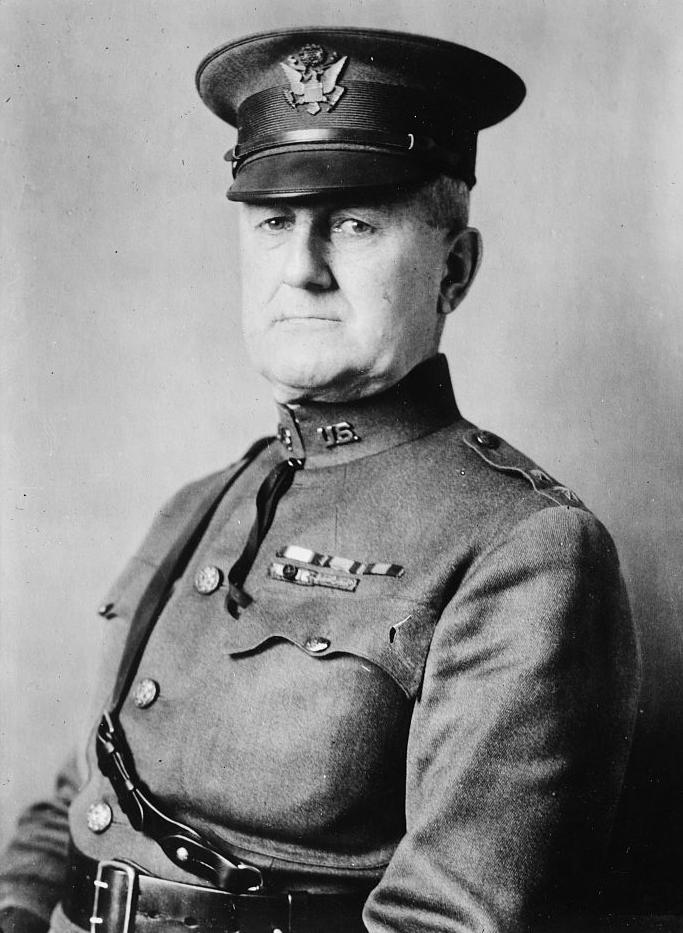
James Harbord

=== Business ===
- Leanne Caret – president and CEO (2018–2022) of Boeing Defense, Space & Security
- Gregory C. Case – CEO of Aon
- James Harbord – major general during World War I; president and chairman of the board for RCA
- Damon T. Hininger – chief executive officer of the Corrections Corporation of America
- Carl Ice – president (2010–14) and president and CEO (2014–20) of BNSF Railway
- Jim Isch – officer at NCAA; interim executive director of NCAA (2009–2010)
- William A. Porter – founder of E-Trade
- Devon Pritchard – president of Nintendo of America

=== Politics, government and military ===
- Emory S. Adams – United States Army general
- Lewis Bloom (grad. 1972) – member of the Kansas House of Representatives
- Joseph Boakai – vice president of Liberia (2006–2018)
- Sam Brinton – nuclear engineer, LGBT activist, policy analyst for Bipartisan Policy Center, and deputy assistant secretary for the Office of Nuclear Energy
- Sam Brownback – U.S. senator, Kansas (1996–2011), 46th governor of Kansas (2011–2018)
- Donald M. Campbell Jr. – commanding general of U.S. Army Recruiting Command in Fort Knox
- John W. Carlin – 40th governor of Kansas; Archivist of the United States (1995–2005)
- Glen E. Edgerton – major general, U.S. Army
- Marlin Fitzwater – press secretary under Ronald Reagan and George H. W. Bush
- Kenji Fujimori – Peruvian businessman and Congressman
- Jim Geringer – 30th governor of Wyoming
- Mike Hayden – 41st governor of Kansas
- Lori Healey – commissioner of the Chicago Department of Planning and Development
- Lynn Jenkins – Kansas state treasurer (2002–08), U.S. House of Representatives (2009–2019)
- Ronald E. Keys – general, U.S. Air Force

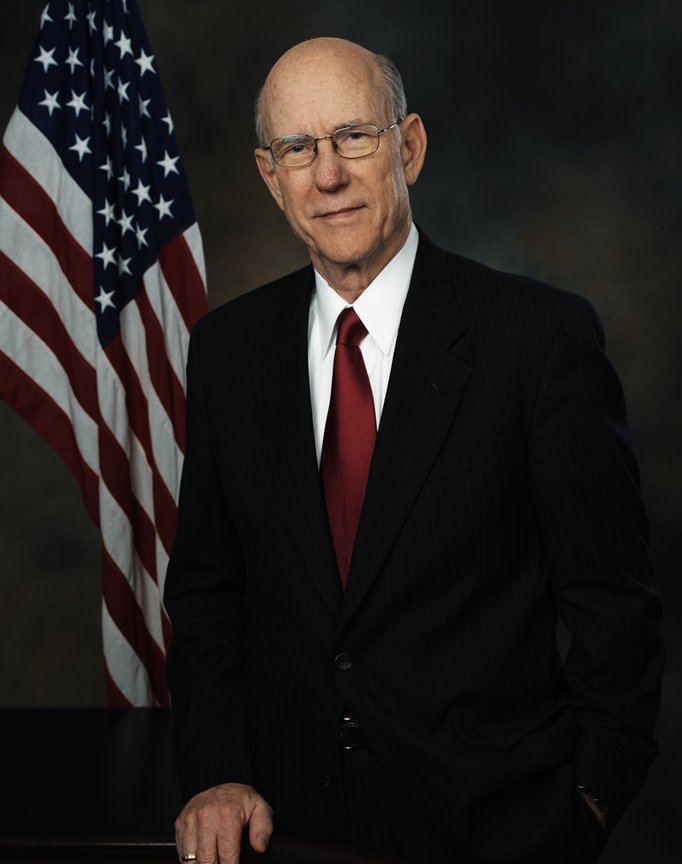
U.S. Sen. Pat Roberts

- Richard A. Knobloch – brigadier general, U.S. Air Force
- Henry D. Linscott – lieutenant general, U.S. Marine Corps
- Roger Marshall – junior United States senator from Kansas
- Michael A. McAuliffe – brigadier general, U.S. Air Force
- Frank B. Morrison – 31st governor of Nebraska (1961–67)
- Richard Myers – chairman of the U.S. Joint Chiefs of Staff (2001–2005)
- Richard Bordeaux Parker – diplomat
- John Jacob Rhodes – minority leader of the U.S. House of Representatives (1973–1981)
- Pat Roberts – U.S. senator, Kansas (1996–2020)
- Bernard W. Rogers – NATO Supreme Allied Commander
- Glenn Rogers – member of the Texas House of Representatives (2021–present)
- Susanna M. Salter – mayor of Argonia, Kansas (1887); first female mayor in the United States
- Fred Andrew Seaton – U.S. senator, Nebraska (1951–1952); U.S. Secretary of the Interior (1956–1961)
- K. Gary Sebelius – magistrate judge of the United States District Court for the District of Kansas
- Harold Sebring – chief justice of the Florida Supreme Court, American judge at the Nuremberg Trials, dean of the Stetson University College of Law, and head coach of the Florida Gators football team
- Richard J. Seitz – lieutenant general, U.S. Army
- Theresa Sparks – president of the San Francisco Police Commission
- John Strick – member of the Kansas State Senate (1985–1992)
- Virginia Trotter – U.S. assistant secretary of Education (1974–1977)
- Harriet Waddy – major in the Women's Army Corps
- Allen West – U.S. House of Representatives from Florida's 22nd district (2011–2013)

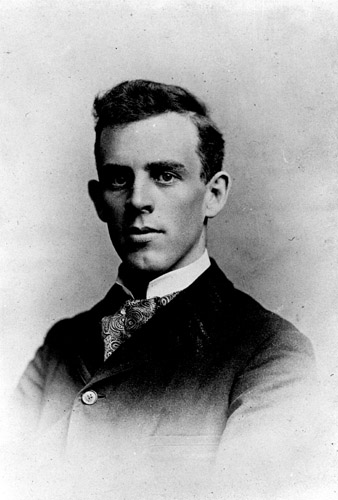
David Fairchild

=== Science and technology ===
- Mark Alfred Carleton – botanist
- David Fairchild – botanist and explorer
- Paul C. Fisher – inventor
- Philip Fox – astronomer
- Alwyn Howard Gentry – botanist
- Luis Montaner – HIV/AIDS researcher
- Nellie M. Payne – entomologist and agricultural chemist
- Elieser Posner – grain scientist
- Geraldine L. Richmond – physical chemist; National Medal of Science laureate
- Lloyd Carlton Stearman – aircraft designer
- Charles Hazelius Sternberg – paleontologist
- Walter Tennyson Swingle – botanist
- Peter Tsai – inventor of N95 mask
- Samuel Wendell Williston – paleontologist

=== Athletics ===
==== Baseball ====
- Elden Auker – All-American (1932); All-Big Six Conference in football, basketball, and baseball; played for Detroit Tigers
- Josh Billings – 11-year Major League Baseball veteran
- Ted Power – 12-year Major League Baseball veteran
- Bobby Randall – played for Minnesota Twins (1976–80), former head baseball coach at Iowa State University (1985–1995), former head baseball coach at University of Kansas (1996–2002)
- Andy Replogle – pitcher for Milwaukee Brewers
- Kite Thomas – outfielder for Philadelphia Athletics, Washington Senators; namesake of Kite's Bar in Manhattan, Kansas
- Carlos Torres – pitcher for Chicago White Sox
- Craig Wilson – All-American (1992); member of the 1992 Olympic baseball team in Barcelona; played for Chicago White Sox
- Earl Woods – father of Tiger Woods; broke color barrier in baseball in the Big Seven Conference at Kansas State

==== Basketball ====
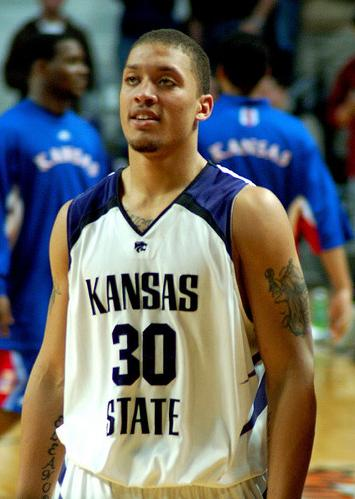
Michael Beasley

- Ernie Barrett – first-round pick in 1951 NBA draft (Boston Celtics), former athletic director at Kansas State, number retired by KSU
- Michael Beasley – active NBA player, All-American and Big 12 Conference Player of the Year (2008), second overall selection in the 2008 NBA draft
- Rolando Blackman – College Basketball Hall of Famer, All-American (1981), first-round pick in 1981 NBA draft (Dallas Mavericks), four-time NBA All-Star
- Bob Boozer – College Basketball Hall of Famer, two-time All-American (1958, 1959), first overall draft pick in 1959 NBA draft (Cincinnati Royals), NBA All-Star
- Bob Chipman – former basketball coach at Washburn University; team won 1986–1987 NAIA national championship
- Norris Coleman (born 1961) – NBA forward for the Los Angeles Clippers, 1994 Israeli Basketball Premier League MVP
- Mike Evans – two-time Big Eight Conference Player of the Year (1977, 1978), first-round pick in 1978 NBA draft (Denver Nuggets), NBA executive and coach
- Marcus Foster (born 1995) – basketball player for Hapoel Tel Aviv of the Israeli Basketball Premier League
- Bill Guthridge – former basketball coach at the University of North Carolina at Chapel Hill, National Coach of the Year (1998)
- D.J. Johnson
- Gene Keady – former basketball coach at Purdue, four-time National Coach of the Year (1984, 1994, 1996, 2000)
- Lon Kruger – basketball coach at Oklahoma, former coach of Atlanta Hawks, two-time Big Eight Conference Player of the Year (1973, 1974)
- Rodney McGruder – active NBA player (Los Angeles Clippers)
- Mike McGuirl (born 1998) – player for Hapoel Haifa in the Israeli Basketball Premier League
- Willie Murrell – led KSU to Final Four in 1964, former ABA basketball player, number retired by KSU
- Nicole Ohlde – three-time All-American (2002, 2003, 2004), first-round pick in 2004 WNBA draft, number retired by KSU
- Jacob Pullen – all-time scoring leader for KSU (2,132 career points), winner of Frances Pomeroy Naismith Award
- Mitch Richmond – Naismith Hall of Fame, All-American (1988), first-round pick in 1988 NBA draft, six-time NBA All-Star, NBA All-Star Game MVP
- Howie Shannon – All-American (1948), first overall draft pick in 1949 BAA Draft (Providence Steamrollers)
- Xavier Sneed (born 1997) – basketball player in the Israeli Basketball Premier League
- Juan "Pachín" Vicéns – named "Best Basketball Player in the World" in 1959
- Kendra Wecker – All-American and Big 12 Conference Player of the Year (2005), first-round pick in 2005 WNBA draft (San Antonio Silver Stars), number retired by KSU
- Tex Winter – former KSU basketball coach, innovator of the Triangle Offense

==== Football ====
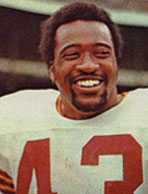
Larry Brown

- Elijah Alexander – NFL linebacker; founder of the Tackle Cancer Foundation
- David Allen – All-American (1998); NFL kick returner
- Michael Bishop – Davey O'Brien Award winner; second in voting for 1998 Heisman Trophy; All-American (1998)
- Larry Brown – 1972 NFL MVP; four-time NFL Pro Bowler
- Russ Campbell – former NFL tight end for the Pittsburgh Steelers
- Chris Canty – two-time All-American (1995, 1996); first-round pick in 1997 NFL draft
- Henry Childs – NFL Pro Bowler
- Paul Coffman – three-time NFL Pro Bowler; member of Green Bay Packers Hall of Fame
- Tyrone Crews – CFL linebacker, Grey Cup champion, BC Lions Wall of Fame
- Ron Dickerson – head football coach for Temple University
- Darrell Dickey – head football coach for University of North Texas
- Lynn Dickey – NFL quarterback; named all-time All-Big Eight QB in 1996; member of Green Bay Packers Hall of Fame
- Josh Freeman – NFL quarterback; first-round draft pick in 2009 NFL draft
- Ralph Graham – starter in 1934 East-West Shrine Game; head football coach for Kansas State
- Martín Gramática – Lou Groza Award winner; All-American (1997); NFL Pro Bowler
- Dean Griffing – Canadian Football Hall of Famer; first general manager of Denver Broncos
- Steve Grogan – NFL quarterback; member of New England Patriots Hall of Fame
- Kirby Hocutt – athletic director at Texas Tech University, Chairman of College Football Playoff Committee (2016– )
- Jason Johnson – former Indianapolis Colts player
- Tony Jordan – NFL running back of Phoenix Cardinals
- Jeff Kelly – All-American (1998); former NFL linebacker
- Collin Klein – Big XII Offensive Player of the Year 2012; Johnny Unitas Golden Arm Award 2012; third in voting for 2012 Heisman Trophy
- Tyler Lockett – NFL wide receiver for the Seattle Seahawks selected for the 2016 Pro Bowl
- Jeron Mastrud – NFL tight end (Miami Dolphins)
- Ralph McFillen – player 1960–1963; NCAA conference commissioner
- Jaime Mendez – All-American (1993); holds KSU record for most interceptions in a season (15)
- Jordy Nelson – All-American (2007); NFL wide receiver (Green Bay Packers)
- Quentin Neujahr – NFL center
- Terence Newman – Jim Thorpe Award winner; unanimous All-American (2002); first-round pick in 2003 NFL draft
- Gary Patterson – head football coach at TCU
- Ellis Rainsberger – head football coach for Kansas State University and Pittsburgh Maulers
- Doug Russell – led NFL in rushing in 1935
- Clarence Scott – All-American (1970); NFL Pro Bowler
- Harold L. "Tom" Sebring – head football coach for the University of Florida (1925–1927)
- Mark Simoneau – All-American (1999); Big 12 Player of the Year; former NFL linebacker
- Sean Snyder – All-American (1992); son of coach Bill Snyder
- Gary Spani – All-American (1977); member of College Football Hall of Fame and Kansas City Chiefs Hall of Fame
- Darren Sproles – All-American (2003); NFL running back; selected as one of "Fifty Greatest San Diego Chargers"
- Bob Stull – athletic director at UTEP
- Veryl Switzer – NFL running back; highest NFL draft pick in KSU history (#4 in 1954)
- Daniel Thomas – NFL running back
- Brent Venables (class of 1992) – current head football coach at Oklahoma 2022-present, he is a former football player at 1989-1980 Garden City Community College, he is a former football player at 1991-1992 Kansas State Wildcats football, he was a former coach at 1993-1995 Kansas State Wildcats football (graduate student), 1996-1998 Kansas State Wildcats football (linebacker assistant), 1999-2003 Oklahoma Sooners football (co-DC/LB), 2004-2011 Oklahoma Sooners football (AHC/DC/LB), 2012-2017 Clemson Tigers football (DC/LB), 2018-2021 Clemson Tigers football (AHC/DC/LB).
- James J. Yeager – head football coach for Iowa State University and the University of Colorado

==== Golf ====
- Jim Colbert – finished second at NCAA Championships; registered 8 victories on PGA Tour and 20 victories on Champions Tour; golf television analyst
- Robert Streb – PGA golfer
- Aaron Watkins – PGA golfer

==== Track and field ====
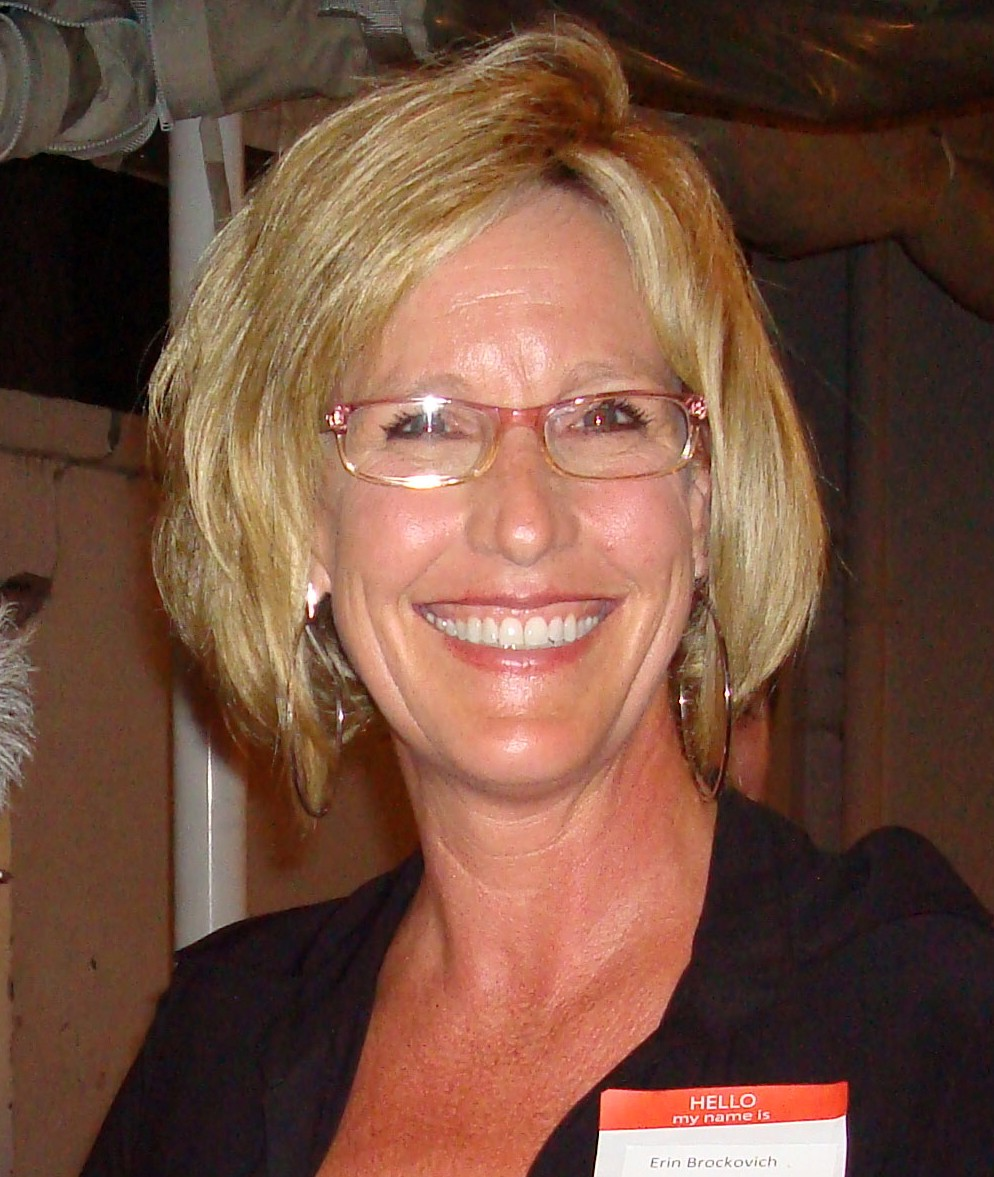
Erin Brockovich

- Thane Baker – winner of four Olympic medals, including gold, at 1952 Summer Olympics and 1956 Summer Olympics
- Tom Brosius – All-American in shot put and discus
- DeLoss Dodds – Big Seven champion; Kansas State track coach (1963–1976); U.S. Track and Field and Cross Country Coaches Association Hall of Fame
- Steve Fritz – Big Eight champion; finished fourth in decathlon at 1996 Summer Olympics; assistant coach at Kansas State
- Kenny Harrison – won gold medal in triple jump at 1996 Summer Olympics
- Erik Kynard – won gold medal in high jump at 2012 Summer Olympics
- Thomas Randolph – two-sport All-American (1992)
- Ivan Riley – won bronze medal in 400 meter hurdles at 1924 Summer Olympics
- Austra Skujytė – won silver medal in heptathlon (for Lithuania) at 2004 Summer Olympics; assistant coach at Kansas State

=== Others ===
- Micky Axton – Women Airforce Service Pilot during World War II and Congressional Gold Medal recipient for her WASP service
- Erin Brockovich – activist
- Sean Lowe – reality star (The Bachelorette, The Bachelor, Dancing with the Stars)
- Jim Rayburn – founder of Young Life
- Kevin Saunders – wheelchair Olympian

== Faculty and staff ==
- Stephen Ambrose – professor of history (1970–71)
- M. Katherine Banks – professor of engineering (1989–1997)
- Helen Brockman – fashion designer (1968–74)
- Helen Stuart Campbell – professor of domestic science (1896–97)
- Elizabeth Williams Champney – secretary of college, drawing instructor (1870–73)
- John Ciardi – professor of English (poetry)
- John Wynn Davidson – first professor of military science (1868–71)
- Kenneth S. Davis – professor of history
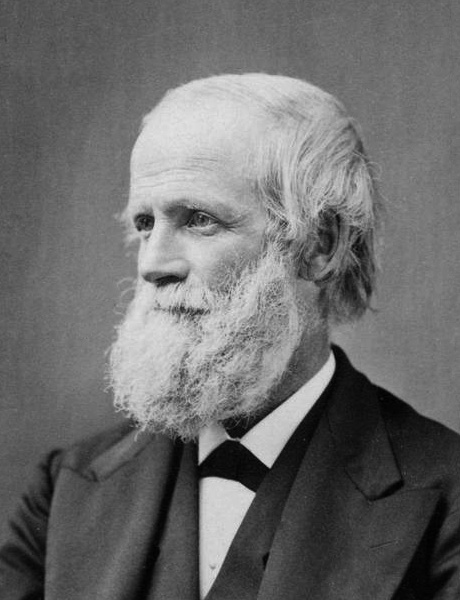
  B.F. Mudge
- Michael Finnegan – professor of anthropology
- Angelo Garzio – emeritus professor of ceramics
- Charles Christian Georgeson – professor of agriculture (1890–98)
- Nehemiah Green – professor of military tactics
- T. Marshall Hahn – dean of College of Arts and Sciences (1959–62); later president of Virginia Tech
- Dale R. Herspring – professor of political science
- A. S. Hitchcock – professor of botany (1892–1901)
- Pascal Hitzler – professor of computer science (2019–present)
- Jonathan Holden – professor of English (poetry) (1978–present)
- John S. Hougham – chairman of philosophy and agriculture (1868–72)
- Lloyd Hulbert – professor of biology (1955–86)
- William Ashbrook Kellerman – professor of botany (1883–91)
- Naomi B. Lynn – professor of political science; later first Hispanic female president of an American public university
- George A. Milliken – professor of statistics
- W. R. Moses – poet; professor of English
- Benjamin Franklin Mudge – Chair of Geology Department (1866–74)
- Philip Nel – professor of English (2000–present)
- Mitsugi Ohno – glassblower of first successful Klein bottle (1961–96)
- Andrew Summers Rowan – professor of military tactics (1902–03)
- Fred Albert Shannon – professor of history; awarded Pulitzer Prize for History in 1929 while teaching at Kansas State
- James Shanteau – professor of psychology
- Maurice Cole Tanquary – professor of entomology (1913–1919)
- Albert M. Ten Eyck – professor of agriculture (1902–06), agronomy (1906–10) and farm management (1910–12)
- Helen B. Thompson (1875–1969) – home economist, professor emeritus at University of California, Los Angeles; Thompson Hall on the Kansas State Agricultural College campus is named in her honor
- Michael Wesch – assistant professor of cultural anthropology, recipient of 2008 U.S. Professor of the Year award from CASE
- Kimberly A. With – professor of biology

== Fictional characters ==
- Joseph, anti-hero of Bruce Jay Friedman's novel A Mother's Kisses, attends "Kansas Land Grant Agricultural College."
- Mary Ashley, main character in Sidney Sheldon's novel Windmills of the Gods, starts the book as a professor at Kansas State University.
- Brantley Foster, protagonist in the movie The Secret of My Success, portrayed by Michael J. Fox, is a recent graduate of Kansas State University who moves to New York City where he has landed a job as a financier.
- Oliver Lang, terrorist in the movie Arlington Road, portrayed by Tim Robbins, is a former Kansas State student.
- Lamar Quin, senior associate in the John Grisham novel The Firm, is noted to have graduated from Kansas State.

== See also ==
- Lists of people from Kansas
