= List of people from Jefferson City, Missouri =

This is a list of the people born in, residents of, or otherwise closely associated with the American city of Jefferson City, Missouri, and its surrounding metropolitan area.

== Arts & entertainment ==
- Janet Beecher, actress of stage and screen; born in Jefferson City
- Cedric the Entertainer (Cedric Kyle), actor/comedian; born in Jefferson City
- Deborah Digges (born Deborah Sugarbaker), poet; born in Jefferson City
- John Farris, author; born in Jefferson City
- Arthur Frommer, travel writer, publisher, consumer advocate, and the founder of the Frommer's series of travel guides; born in Jefferson City
- Chester Himes, author; born in Jefferson City
- Kent Jones, writer and radio personality; attended Jefferson City public schools
- Laura La Varnie, actress of the silent era; born in Jefferson City
- William Rose, screenwriter known for writing Guess Who's Coming to Dinner; born in Jefferson City
- Shaman's Harvest, hard rock band
- Charlie Weber, film and television actor, How to Get Away with Murder

== Business ==
- John Opel, former president of IBM; attended Jefferson City public schools

== Education ==
- Lorenzo Greene, Lincoln University faculty and civil rights pioneer
- Josephine Silone Yates, professor and head of the natural science department at Lincoln University, first Black woman to hold a full professorship or head a science department in the U.S.

== Government ==
- James T. Blair Jr., mayor of Jefferson City in 1947 and later governor of Missouri
- Richard Everett Dorr, former U.S. federal judge; born in Jefferson City
- Patricia A. Goodrich, member of the Wisconsin State Assembly; born in Jefferson City
- John A. Gordon, former deputy director of the Central Intelligence Agency; born in Jefferson City
- James Kirkpatrick, former Missouri Secretary of State; former editor of the Jefferson City News-Tribune
- Stephen R. Leopold, former member of the Wisconsin State Assembly; born in Jefferson City
- Blaine Luetkemeyer, U.S. representative for Missouri's 3rd congressional district; born in Jefferson City and graduated from Lincoln University
- Richard R. Nacy, former state treasurer of Missouri; born and raised in Jefferson City
- Karl L. Rundberg (1899–1969), Los Angeles City Council member
- Rodney W. Sippel, United States federal judge; born in Jefferson City
- Sarah Steelman, former state treasurer of Missouri; born and raised in Jefferson City
- Carl M. Vogel, former member of the Missouri Senate; born and raised in Jefferson City
- Harold Volkmer, former member of the United States House of Representatives; born and raised in Jefferson City

== Religion ==
- Charles Roman Koester, former American bishop of the Catholic Church; born in Jefferson City
- Reginald Heber Weller, Episcopal priest and bishop active in the ecumenism; born in Jefferson City

== Science ==
- Brittany Friedman, sociologist; raised in Jefferson City and attended Jefferson City public schools
- Jack S. Kilby, Nobel Prize-winning inventor and physicist; born in Jefferson City
- William A. Massey, mathematician and operations researcher with expertise in queueing theory; born in Jefferson City
- P. David Polly, vertebrate paleontologist; born in Jefferson City
- David Sugarbaker, cancer surgeon most known for developing new surgical treatments of mesothelioma

== Sports ==
- Mishael Abbott, race car driver; born in Jefferson City
- OG Anunoby, forward for the New York Knicks; raised from early childhood in Jefferson City and attended Jefferson City High School
- Charlie Brown, former NFL running back born in Jefferson City
- Christian Cantwell, 2009 shot put world champion, born in Jefferson City
- Joe Crede, major league baseball player, won 2005 World Series with Chicago White Sox; born in Jefferson City
- Napheesa Collier, WNBA player for the Minnesota Lynx and two-time Olympic gold medalist, born in Jefferson City
- John Daly, professional golfer on the PGA Tour
- Justin Gage, former football player for the Chicago Bears and the Tennessee Titans; attended Jefferson City public schools
- Tom Henke, major league baseball player, won 1992 World Series with Toronto Blue Jays, also pitched for the St. Louis Cardinals; lives in nearby Taos
- Dennis Higgins, former professional pitcher; born in Jefferson City
- Joe Jimenez, professional golfer best known for winning the 1978 PGA Seniors' Championship; was the club pro at the Jefferson City Country Club
- Sam LeCure, former major league baseball player for the Cincinnati Reds; born near Jefferson City
- Steve Martin, former football player; attended Jefferson City public schools
- Napoleon McCallum, former running back for the Los Angeles Raiders in the National Football League; born in Jefferson City
- Dennis Meyer, former Pittsburgh Steelers football player and coach; born in Jefferson City
- Paul Miller, basketball player; born in Jefferson City
- Maya Moore, former WNBA player for the Minnesota Lynx and Olympic gold medalist; born in Jefferson City and attended Jefferson City public schools
- Clint Robinson, professional first baseman with the Los Angeles Dodgers
- Steve Rogers, former starting pitcher for the Montreal Expos; born in Jefferson City
- Justin Smith, former football player with the Cincinnati Bengals and San Francisco 49ers; born and raised in Jefferson City
- Jamaal Tatum, former college basketball player for Southern Illinois Salukis; born and raised in Jefferson City
- Don Webb, former college and Professional Football defensive back
- Keith Weber, former quarterback and pitcher for the University of Missouri
- Sylvester Williams, defensive tackle for the Detroit Lions; attended Jefferson City High School

== Other ==
- Alphonso Boone, pioneer who ran a trading post in Jefferson City
- Suzette Haden Elgin, linguist, inventor of Láadan; born in Jefferson City
- Lloyd L. Gaines, plaintiff in Missouri ex rel. Gaines v. Canada (1938), one of the most important court cases in the Civil Rights Movement in the 1930s; attended Lincoln University
- Harriet M. Waddy, military officer

== See also ==
- List of people from Missouri
