= JLB =

JLB may refer to:

- Jewish Lads' Brigade, a Jewish youth organisation
- Johann Ludwig Bach, German composer of the Bach family – specifically the catalogue of compositions of this composer uses the abbreviation JLB
- John Logie Baird, Scottish inventor
- Jorge Luis Borges, an Argentinian author
- Journal of Leukocyte Biology, a medical journal
- Long Beach Heliport, USA (by IATA code)
- WJLB, a radio station in Detroit, USA
- PT Jakarta Lingkar Baratsatu, a company operating the Jakarta Outer Ring Road
- JLB Credit, a fictional credit company from the British sitcom Peep Show
