= Kimberly A. With =

American ecologist

Academic background
- Education: B.S., Biology, 1985, San Francisco State University; M.S., Biology, 1988, Northern Arizona University; PhD., Zoology, 1993, Colorado State University
- Thesis: The translation of patterns across scales: analysis of movement patterns in a grassland mosaic (1993)

Academic work
- Discipline: Biology
- Institutions: Bowling Green State University; Kansas State University

Kimberly A. With is an American ecologist and conservation scientist known for her research into the ecological consequences of human-caused habitat loss, habitat fragmentation, and land management, especially how such landscape changes contribute to a disruption of population and landscape connectivity, increased species' extinction risk, and invasive spread by non-native species. She is currently Professor Emerita in the Division of Biology at Kansas State University.

== Career ==
While an undergraduate at San Francisco State University, With began working as a summer research assistant on various bird-related projects at the Sagehen Creek Field Station and Blodgett Forest Research Station (the latter now part of Berkeley Forests) managed by the University of California, Berkeley in the Sierra Nevada range of California.

After earning a Bachelor of Science in biology in 1985, With went to Northern Arizona University in pursuit of a Master of Science degree. Her thesis research was in the area of behavioral ecology and involved a comparative study of parental care in Western Bluebirds during the nestling and fledgling periods. Both sexes engaged more-or-less equally in feeding offspring, but increased feeding rates by 60% during the fledgling period over the nestling period, with fledglings from smaller broods (<5 offspring) fed at higher rates than those from larger broods, suggesting there exist energetic constraints on parental provisioning rates.

Following her master's degree, With went on for a Doctor of Philosophy (Ph.D.) in zoology at Colorado State University. There, she was introduced to the then-emerging fields of landscape ecology and conservation biology, both of which continued to influence her research throughout her career. With was awarded a Ph.D. in 1993 for her dissertation on translating individual movement patterns across spatial scales to predict the resulting distribution of species within heterogeneous landscapes. The rate at which individual species move through different habitats, in conjunction with the relative abundance of those habitats, can predict whether species exhibit a random or clumped (patchy) distribution within the landscape. Notably, the shift from a random to a clumped distribution may occur at a critical threshold amount of habitat on the landscape. A paper from her dissertation on critical thresholds in species' responses to landscape structure was published in the journal Ecology in 1995 and was awarded "Outstanding Paper published in the Discipline of Landscape Ecology" by the U.S. Regional Chapter of the International Association for Landscape Ecology (US-IALE, now IALE-North America) in 1996.

After receiving her Ph.D., With was awarded a prestigious U.S. Department of Energy Alexander Hollaender Distinguished Postdoctoral Fellowship to work with the landscape ecology group in the Environmental Sciences Division at the Oak Ridge National Laboratory for two years (1993-1995). There, she used computer-simulation models founded on percolation theory to explore how landscape connectivity was influenced by a combination of landscape structure (the abundance and distribution of habitat), habitat heterogeneity (habitats that differed in quality or suitability), and the different affinities of species for those habitats, thereby expanding the concept of landscape connectivity to heterogeneous landscapes.

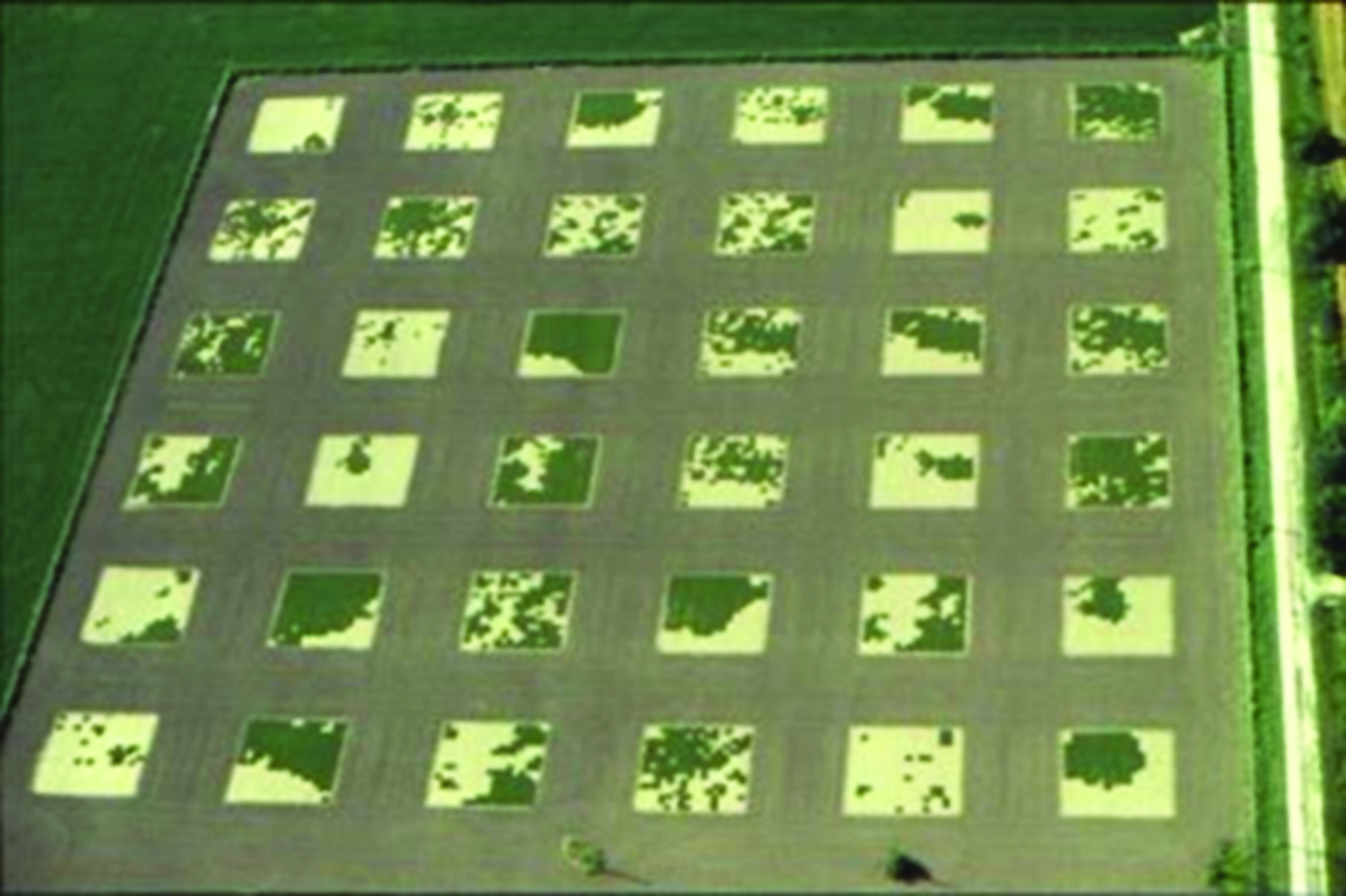
Aerial View of the Experimental Model Landscape System Individual "landscape" plots (white and green squares) were created by sowing red clover according to a specified pattern within each using a computer-generated template (a neutral landscape model) in which both the amount and fragmentation of habitat were varied.

In 1995, she accepted a tenure-track faculty position at Bowling Green State University in Ohio, where she led experimental and theoretical investigations into how habitat loss versus fragmentation affected biodiversity and species' interactions (e.g., predator-prey and host-parasitoid relationships). This work was founded on computer-generated landscape models (neutral landscape models) using fractal distributions, which permitted individual control over the amount versus the degree of fragmentation of habitat. Neutral landscape models were also the inspiration for a unique experimental model landscape system she devised, in which small, individual "landscapes" were created in the field by varying both the amount and fragmentation of red clover habitat within 256-m^{2} plots, and then studying what insect species and other arthropods colonized and persisted within these model landscapes. Importantly, predators and parasitoids may be unable to locate their insect prey or hosts (e.g., aphids) efficiently once habitat falls below a threshold amount (e.g., 20-50%), especially in fragmented landscapes, resulting in lower predation and parasitism rates that could have important implications for the biological control of crop pests.

Beyond this experimental work, a theoretical paper she wrote during her time at Bowling Green State University modeled how habitat loss and fragmentation influenced extinction risk in migratory bird populations and was published in Biological Conservation. Thresholds in population persistence may exist for certain species, but the level of habitat required for persistence ranged widely from 5% to 90% depending on the species' sensitivity to habitat edges (how nesting success declined as a function of decreasing patch size and increasing edge habitat) and the pattern of habitat loss (whether habitat was also being fragmented). This research demonstrated that far more habitat than the oft-cited habitat threshold of 20% (e.g.,) may be needed to ensure population persistence for some species. In 2002, this paper received the "Award for Outstanding Paper published in Landscape Ecology" by the US-IALE (now IALE-North America), making With the only person to be awarded this distinction twice as lead author.

In 2000, With left Bowling Green State University to become an assistant professor in the Division of Biology at Kansas State University. She was tenured and promoted to Associate Professor in 2002 and to Full Professor in 2012. There, she continued to develop her theoretical modeling work on landscape effects on populations, expanding her focus to include the consequences for the biological invasion of pests, pathogens, and other invasive species. Among her accomplishments at Kansas State, she also led a study to develop a regional assessment of population viability for grassland birds in the Flint Hills, which contain the largest intact tallgrass prairie landscape left in the world. The study, which was published in the journal Biological Conservation, found that several species considered to be the core of the breeding bird community in this ecosystem (Dickcissel, Grasshopper Sparrow, Eastern Meadowlark) are projected to be declining even though ample habitat still remains in the region. This is in keeping with a later 2019 study by another research group that found that grassland bird populations in North America have fallen 53% since 1970, the most of any bird group.

In 2016, With was named the recipient of the Distinguished Landscape Ecologist Award from the US-International Association for Landscape Ecology (now IALE-North America). This award highlights "those scholars whose scientific endeavors pervade [the] discipline and its continuing development and who have contributed positively to the professional and scholarly development of other landscape ecologists. This award is ordinarily given for outstanding contributions over a period of a decade or more, and it is the most prestigious honor bestowed by [the] Chapter."

In 2019, With published a textbook, "Essentials of Landscape Ecology," through Oxford University Press. This book was recognized in 2020 by the British Ecological Society with its "Book of the Year Award" sponsored by the Marsh Charitable Trust.

Kimberly A. With is listed among the World's Top 2% Scientists. Among the many professional offices she has held, she most recently served as the President of IALE-North America from 2022 to 2024. In 2024, With was granted the title of Professor Emerita at Kansas State University.

== Selected publications ==
- With, Kimberly A. (1994). "Using fractal analysis to assess how species perceive landscape structure". Landscape Ecology. 9 (1): 25–36. Bibcode:1994LaEco...9...25W. doi:10.1007/BF00135076.
- With, Kimberly A.; Crist, Thomas O. (1995). "Critical thresholds in species' responses to landscape structure". Ecology. 76 (8): 2446–2459. Bibcode:1995Ecol...76.2446W. doi:10.2307/2265819. JSTOR 2265819.
- With, Kimberly A.; Gardner, Robert H.; Turner, Monica G. (1997). "Landscape connectivity and population distributions in heterogeneous environments". Oikos. 78 (1): 151–169. Bibcode:1997Oikos..78..151W. doi:10.2307/3545811. JSTOR 3545811.
- With, Kimberly A. (1997). "The application of neutral landscape models in conservation biology". Conservation Biology. 11 (5): 1069–1080. Bibcode:1997ConBi..11.1069W. doi:10.1046/j.1523-1739.1997.96210.x. JSTOR 2387389.
- With, Kimberly A.; King, Anthony W. (1997). "The use and misuse of neutral landscape models in ecology". Oikos. 79 (2): 219–229. Bibcode:1997Oikos..79..219W. doi:10.2307/3546007. JSTOR 3546007.
- With, Kimberly A.; King, Anthony W. (1999). "Extinction thresholds for species in fractal landscapes". Conservation Biology. 13 (2): 314–326. doi:10.1046/j.1523-1739.1999.013002314.x.
- With, Kimberly A.; King, Anthony W. (2001). "Analysis of landscape sources and sinks: the effect of spatial pattern on avian demography". Biological Conservation. 100: 75–88. Bibcode:2001BCons.100...75W. doi:10.1016/S0006-3207(00)00209-3.
- With, Kimberly A. (2002). "The landscape ecology of invasive spread". Conservation Biology. 16 (5): 1192–1203. doi:10.1046/j.1523-1739.2002.01064.x.
- With, Kimberly A.; Pavuk, Daniel M.; Worchuck, Jennifer L.; Oates, Rhonda K.; Fisher, Jamie L. (2002). "Threshold effects of landscape structure on biological control in agroecosystems". Ecological Applications. 12: 52–65. doi:10.1890/1051-0761(2002)012[0052:TEOLSO]2.0.CO;2.
- With, Kimberly A.; King, Anthony W.; Jensen, William E. (2008). "Remaining large grasslands may not be sufficient to prevent grassland bird declines". Biological Conservation. 141 (12): 3152–3167. Bibcode:2008BCons.141.3152W. doi:10.1016/j.biocon.2008.09.025.
- With, Kimberly A.; Pavuk, Daniel M. (2011). "Habitat area trumps fragmentation effects on arthropods in an experimental landscape system". Landscape Ecology. 26 (7): 1035–1048. Bibcode:2011LaEco..26.1035W. doi:10.1007/s10980-011-9627-x.
- With, Kimberly A.; Pavuk, Daniel M. (2012). "Direct versus indirect effects of habitat fragmentation on community patterns in experimental landscapes". Oecologia. 170 (2): 517–528. Bibcode:2012Oecol.170..517W. doi:10.1007/s00442-012-2325-9. PMID 22526941.
- With, Kimberly A. (2015). "How fast do migratory songbirds have to adapt to keep pace with rapidly changing landscapes?". Landscape Ecology. 30 (7): 1351–1361. Bibcode:2015LaEco..30.1351W. doi:10.1007/s10980-015-0191-7.
- With, Kimberly A. (2016). "Are landscapes more than the sum of their patches?". Landscape Ecology. 31 (5): 969–980. Bibcode:2016LaEco..31..969W. doi:10.1007/s10980-015-0328-8.
- With, Kimberly A.; Pavuk, Daniel M. (2019). "Habitat configuration matters when evaluating habitat-area effects on host-parasitoid interactions". Ecosphere. 10 (2) e02604. Bibcode:2019Ecosp..10E2604W. doi:10.1002/ecs2.2604. hdl:2097/39446.
- With, Kimberly A. (2019). Essentials of Landscape Ecology. Oxford University Press. ISBN 978-0-19-883838-8.
- With, Kimberly A.; Payne, Alison R. (2021). "An experimental test of the habitat amount hypothesis reveals little effect of habitat area but transient or indirect effects of fragmentation on local species richness". Landscape Ecology. 36 (9): 2505–2517. Bibcode:2021LaEco..36.2505W. doi:10.1007/s10980-021-01289-5.
- With, Kimberly A.; Ramalho, Werther P.; McIntosh, Tanner; Signorelli, Luciana (2024). "The agricultural transformation of Brazil's Cerrado is influencing the diversity and distribution of tadpoles via lentification". Biodiversity and Conservation. 33 (8–9): 2567–2592. Bibcode:2024BiCon..33.2567W. doi:10.1007/s10531-024-02873-2.
