= Cheyenne Wells, Colorado =

Town in Colorado, U.S.

- Statutory town
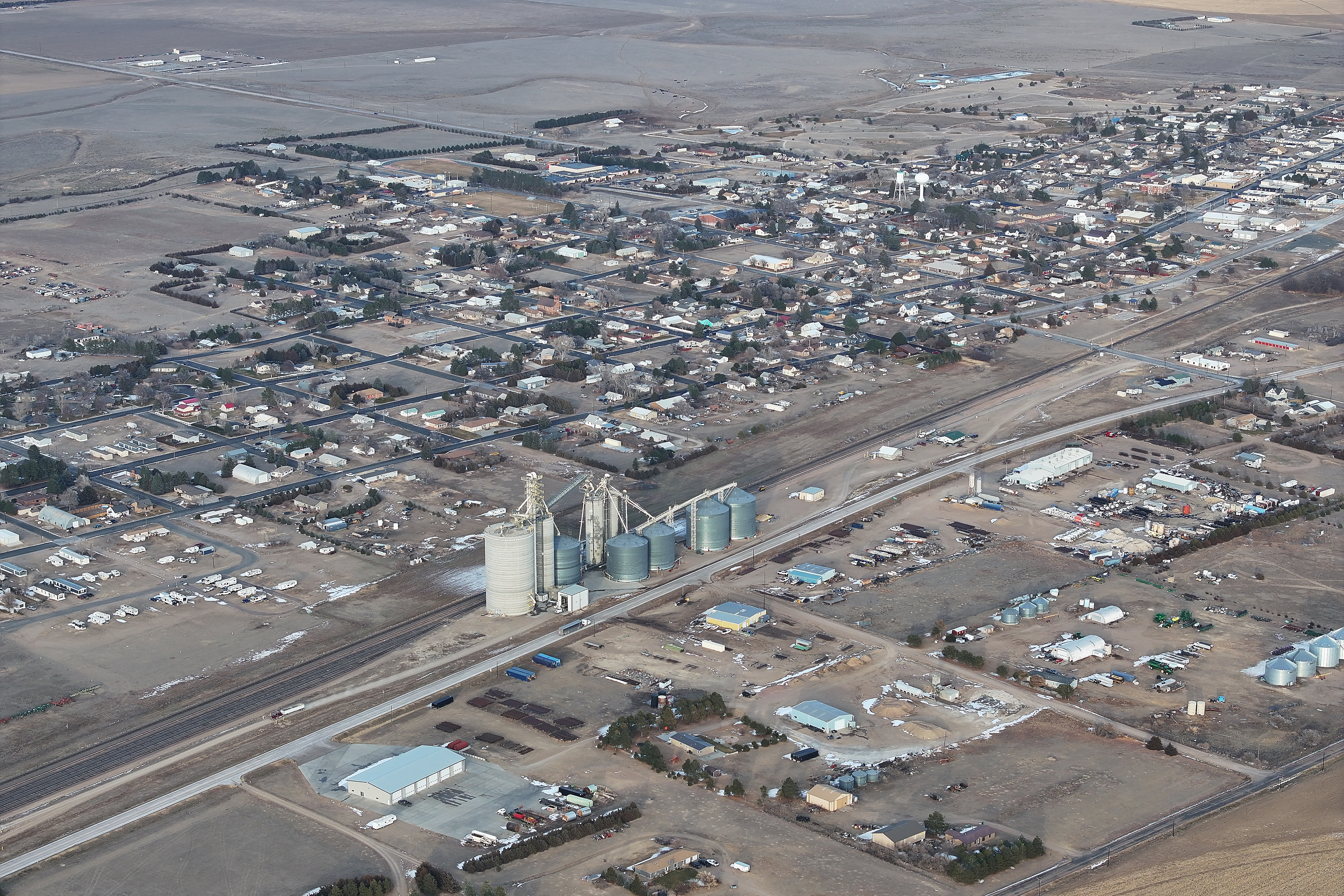
- Cheyenne Wells (2025)

- Location within Cheyenne County and Colorado
- Coordinates: 38°49′09″N 102°21′07″W
- Country: United States
- State: Colorado
- County: Cheyenne
- Founded: 1870s
- Incorporated: May 14, 1890

Government
  - Type: Statutory town

Area
  - Total: 2.770 km^{2} (1.070 sq mi)
  - Land: 2.770 km^{2} (1.070 sq mi)
  - Water: 0.000 km^{2} (0 sq mi)
- Elevation: 1,308 m (4,292 ft)

Population (2020)
  - Total: 758
  - Density: 274/km^{2} (709/sq mi)
- Time zone: UTC−07:00 (MST)
  - Summer (DST): UTC−06:00 (MDT)
- ZIP code: 80810
- Area code: 719
- GNIS town ID: 2413197
- FIPS code: 08-14175
- Website: townofcheyennewells.com

Cheyenne Wells is the statutory town that is the county seat of Cheyenne County, Colorado, United States. The town population was 758 at the 2020 United States census.

== History ==
The community was named for water wells near the town site that were discovered and maintained by the Cheyenne Indians who lived in the area. The Cheyenne Wells, Colorado Territory, post office opened on May 8, 1876. Cheyenne County was created on March 25, 1889, with Cheyenne Wells as the county seat, and the Town of Cheyenne Wells was incorporated on May 14, 1890.

== Geography ==
At the 2020 United States census, the town had a total area of 684 acres (2.770 km^{2}), all of it land.

=== Climate ===
Climate data for Cheyenne Wells 2NE, Colorado (1991–2020 normals, extremes 1897–2020)
Month	Jan	Feb	Mar	Apr	May	Jun	Jul	Aug	Sep	Oct	Nov	Dec	Year
Record high °F (°C)	78 (26)	82 (28)	91 (33)	95 (35)	105 (41)	108 (42)	109 (43)	107 (42)	102 (39)	96 (36)	89 (32)	88 (31)	109 (43)
Mean daily maximum °F (°C)	44.0 (6.7)	47.0 (8.3)	57.1 (13.9)	64.7 (18.2)	74.0 (23.3)	85.7 (29.8)	90.6 (32.6)	88.2 (31.2)	81.6 (27.6)	67.3 (19.6)	54.1 (12.3)	44.2 (6.8)	66.5 (19.2)
Daily mean °F (°C)	31.8 (−0.1)	33.9 (1.1)	43.0 (6.1)	50.1 (10.1)	59.9 (15.5)	70.5 (21.4)	75.8 (24.3)	74.0 (23.3)	66.7 (19.3)	53.1 (11.7)	41.1 (5.1)	32.1 (0.1)	52.7 (11.5)
Mean daily minimum °F (°C)	19.6 (−6.9)	20.9 (−6.2)	28.8 (−1.8)	35.4 (1.9)	45.7 (7.6)	55.3 (12.9)	61.1 (16.2)	59.8 (15.4)	51.9 (11.1)	38.8 (3.8)	28.1 (−2.2)	20.0 (−6.7)	38.8 (3.8)
Record low °F (°C)	−23 (−31)	−31 (−35)	−16 (−27)	−2 (−19)	15 (−9)	31 (−1)	40 (4)	33 (1)	18 (−8)	1 (−17)	−13 (−25)	−24 (−31)	−31 (−35)
Average precipitation inches (mm)	0.22 (5.6)	0.38 (9.7)	0.68 (17)	1.40 (36)	2.09 (53)	2.24 (57)	3.72 (94)	2.65 (67)	1.15 (29)	1.15 (29)	0.39 (9.9)	0.29 (7.4)	16.36 (416)
Average snowfall inches (cm)	2.9 (7.4)	4.1 (10)	2.9 (7.4)	2.4 (6.1)	0.2 (0.51)	0.0 (0.0)	0.0 (0.0)	0.0 (0.0)	0.2 (0.51)	1.1 (2.8)	2.6 (6.6)	3.1 (7.9)	19.5 (50)
Average precipitation days (≥ 0.01 in)	1.9	2.7	3.7	5.1	7.2	7.0	7.7	6.9	4.1	4.0	2.6	2.6	55.5
Average snowy days (≥ 0.1 in)	1.7	2.4	1.6	1.3	0.1	0.0	0.0	0.0	0.1	0.6	1.2	2.0	11.0
Source: NOAA

== Demographics ==
Historical population
Census	Pop.	Note	%±
1910	270		—
1920	508		88.1%
1930	595		17.1%
1940	695		16.8%
1950	1,154		66.0%
1960	1,020		−11.6%
1970	982		−3.7%
1980	950		−3.3%
1990	1,128		18.7%
2000	1,010		−10.5%
2010	846		−16.2%
2020	758		−10.4%
U.S. Decennial Census

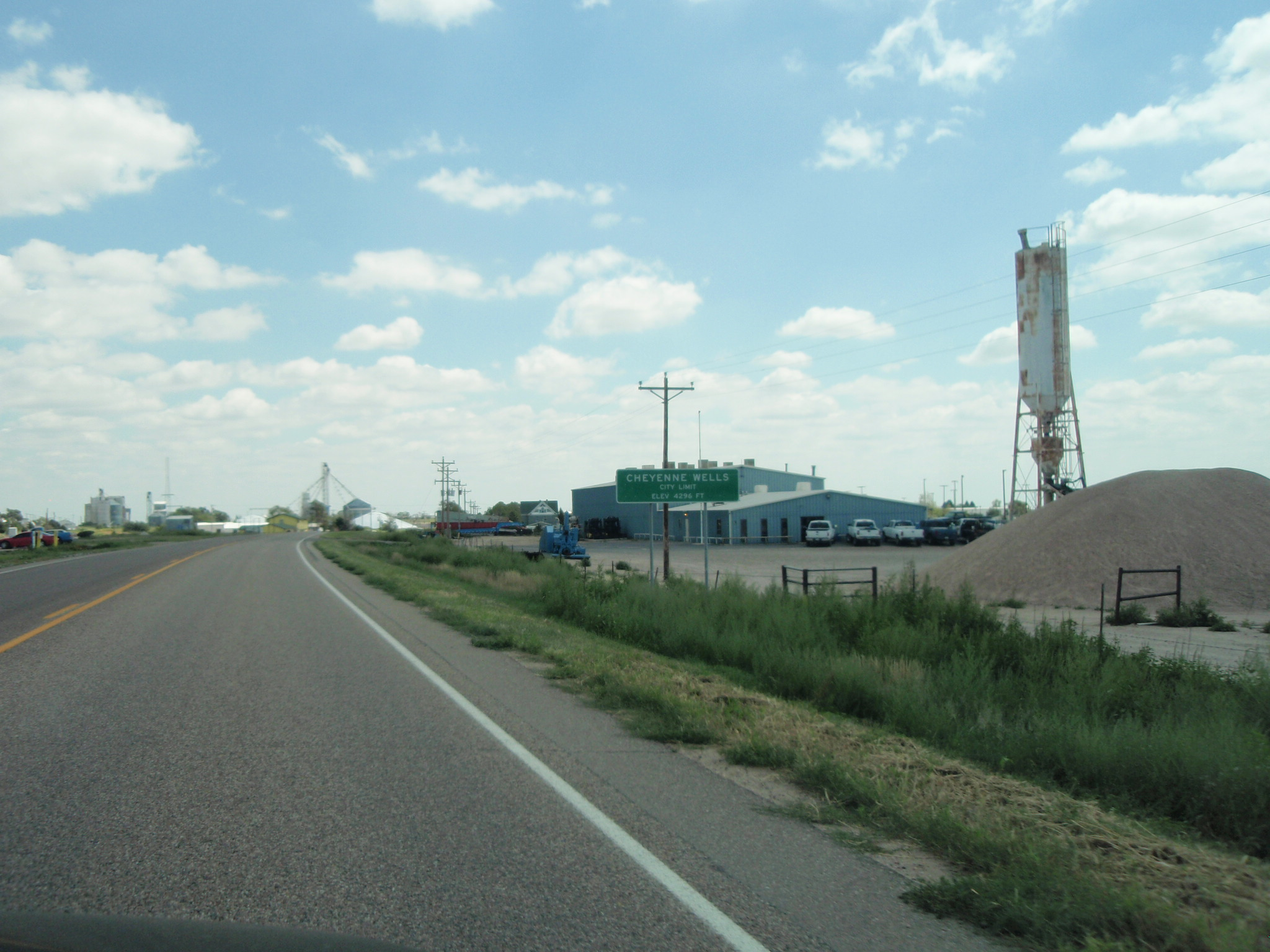
Cheyenne Wells town limits (2011)

As of the census of 2000, there were 1,010 people, 417 households, and 261 families residing in the town. The population density was 974.3 inhabitants per square mile (376.2/km^{2}). There were 505 housing units at an average density of 487.2 per square mile (188.1/km^{2}). The racial makeup of the town was 91.19% White, 0.99% African American, 0.79% Native American, 0.10% Asian, 6.44% from other races, and 0.50% from two or more races. Hispanic or Latino of any race were 9.90% of the population.

There were 417 households, out of which 33.3% had children under the age of 18 living with them, 53.5% were married couples living together, 6.5% had a female householder with no husband present, and 37.2% were non-families. 33.3% of all households were made up of individuals, and 13.7% had someone living alone who was 65 years of age or older. The average household size was 2.38 and the average family size was 3.08.

27.2% of the population was under the age of 18, 8.1% from 18 to 24, 27.9% from 25 to 44, 20.8% from 45 to 64, and 15.9% who were 65 years of age or older. The median age was 38 years. For every 100 females, there were 100.0 males. For every 100 females age 18 and over, there were 99.7 males.

The median income for a household in the town was $36,563, and the median income for a family was $45,132. Males had a median income of $32,941 versus $23,077 for females. The per capita income for the town was $18,840. About 7.5% of families and 11.1% of the population were below the poverty line, including 12.4% of those under age 18 and 12.2% of those age 65 or over.

== Economy ==
Tumbleweed Midstream owns the Ladder Creek Helium Plant near Cheyenne Wells. It is only one of fourteen helium plants in the world.

== Infrastructure ==
=== Transportation ===
==== Rail ====
The Union Pacific Railroad passes through Cheyenne Wells.

==== Highways ====
U.S. Highway 40 passes through the community and follows roughly parallel to the railway.

== Notable people ==
Notable individuals who were born in or have lived in Cheyenne Wells include:

- Nellie M. Payne (1900-1990), agricultural chemist, entomologist

== See also ==
- List of county seats in Colorado
