= Journal of Leukocyte Biology =

- Discipline: Immunology
- Language: English
- Edited by: Luis J. Montaner

Publication details
- Former name(s): Journal of the Reticuloendothelial Society
- History: 1955–present
- Publisher: Society for Leukocyte Biology (United States)
- Frequency: Monthly
- Open access: Delayed, after 12 months, and hybrid
- Impact factor: 4.289 (2014)

Standard abbreviations
- ISO 4: J. Leukoc. Biol.

Indexing
- CODEN: JLBIE7
- ISSN: 0741-5400 (print); 1938-3673 (web)
- LCCN: 84643266
- OCLC no.: 10186822

Links
- Journal homepage; Online access; Online archives

The Journal of Leukocyte Biology is a monthly peer-reviewed medical journal covering all aspects of immunology. The focus of the journal is on leukocyte physiology and leukocyte behavior within the immune system. Content is available for free after a 12-month embargo. Since 2009, the editor-in-chief has been Luis J. Montaner. The journal is published by the Society for Leukocyte Biology.

== Abstracting and indexing ==
The journal is abstracted and indexed in:

- BIOSIS Previews
- CAB Abstracts
- Chemical Abstracts
- Current Contents/Life Sciences
- Embase
- Global Health
- Index Medicus/MEDLINE/PubMed
- International Bibliography of Periodical Literature
- Science Citation Index
- Scopus
- Tropical Diseases Bulletin

According to the Journal Citation Reports, the journal has a 2014 impact factor of 4.289, ranking it 66th out of 184 journals in the category "Cell Biology", 13th out of 68 journals in the category "Hematology" and 31st out of 148 journals in the category "Immunology"

== History ==
The journal was established in 1955 as the Journal of the Reticuloendothelial Society. It was originally published by Academic Press. In 1984 the Reticuloendothelial Society changed its name to the Society for Leukocyte Biology and the journal obtained its current name. The original editors-in-chief were A.S. Gordon and B.N. Halpern. Other editors have included J.W. Rebuck, Quenten Myrvik (1974–1980), and Carleton Stewart (1981–1994).
