= Whiting, Kansas =

City in Jackson County, Kansas

- City
- Location within Jackson County and Kansas

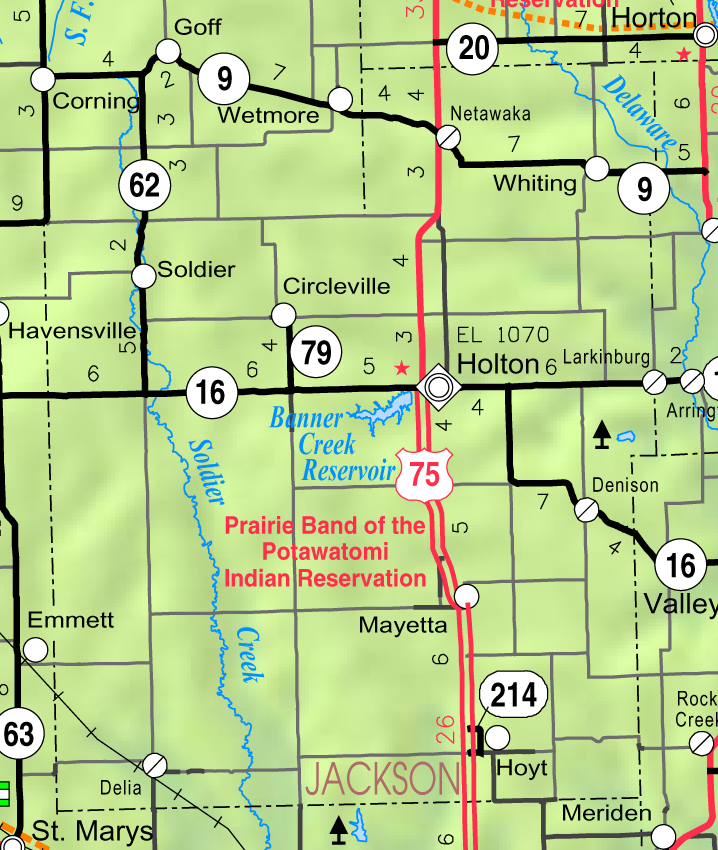
- KDOT map of Jackson County (legend)
- Coordinates: 39°35′16″N 95°36′40″W
- Country: United States
- State: Kansas
- County: Jackson
- Founded: 1866
- Named for: Martha Whiting

Area
  - Total: 1.01 sq mi (2.61 km^{2})
  - Land: 1.01 sq mi (2.61 km^{2})
  - Water: 0 sq mi (0.00 km^{2})
- Elevation: 1,109 ft (338 m)

Population (2020)
  - Total: 191
  - Density: 190/sq mi (73.2/km^{2})
- Time zone: UTC-6 (CST)
  - Summer (DST): UTC-5 (CDT)
- ZIP Code: 66552
- Area code: 785
- FIPS code: 20-78100
- GNIS ID: 2397306
- Website: cityofwhitingks.com

Whiting is a city in Jackson County, Kansas, United States. As of the 2020 census, the population of the city was 191.

== History ==
Whiting was founded in 1866. It was named for Mrs. Martha S. Whiting, who became the second wife of Senator Samuel C. Pomeroy.

The first post office in Whiting was established in June 1869.

== Geography ==
According to the United States Census Bureau, the city has a total area of 1.00 square mile (2.59 km^{2}), all land.

== Demographics ==
Historical population
Census	Pop.	Note	%±
1880	221		—
1890	381		72.4%
1900	384		0.8%
1910	426		10.9%
1920	433		1.6%
1930	351		−18.9%
1940	343		−2.3%
1950	267		−22.2%
1960	233		−12.7%
1970	256		9.9%
1980	270		5.5%
1990	213		−21.1%
2000	206		−3.3%
2010	187		−9.2%
2020	191		2.1%
U.S. Decennial Census

Whiting is part of the Topeka, Kansas, Metropolitan Statistical Area.

=== 2010 census ===
As of the census of 2010, there were 187 people, 84 households, and 51 families residing in the city. The population density was 187.0 inhabitants per square mile (72.2/km^{2}). There were 95 housing units at an average density of 95.0 per square mile (36.7/km^{2}). The racial makeup of the city was 91.4% White, 1.6% Native American, and 7.0% from two or more races.

There were 84 households, of which 26.2% had children under the age of 18 living with them, 44.0% were married couples living together, 7.1% had a female householder with no husband present, 9.5% had a male householder with no wife present, and 39.3% were non-families. 34.5% of all households were made up of individuals, and 16.7% had someone living alone who was 65 years of age or older. The average household size was 2.23 and the average family size was 2.80.

The median age in the city was 41.3 years. 21.9% of residents were under the age of 18; 6.9% were between the ages of 18 and 24; 25.7% were from 25 to 44; 30% were from 45 to 64; and 15.5% were 65 years of age or older. The gender makeup of the city was 48.1% male and 51.9% female.

=== 2000 census ===
As of the census of 2000, there were 206 people, 91 households, and 55 families residing in the city. The population density was 204.6 inhabitants per square mile (79.0/km^{2}). There were 109 housing units at an average density of 108.3 per square mile (41.8/km^{2}). The racial makeup of the city was 95.63% White, 3.40% Native American, and 0.97% from two or more races.

There were 91 households, out of which 26.4% had children under the age of 18 living with them, 49.5% were married couples living together, 6.6% had a female householder with no husband present, and 38.5% were non-families. 37.4% of all households were made up of individuals, and 15.4% had someone living alone who was 65 years of age or older. The average household size was 2.26 and the average family size was 2.93.

In the city, the population was spread out, with 23.8% under the age of 18, 9.2% from 18 to 24, 29.1% from 25 to 44, 22.3% from 45 to 64, and 15.5% who were 65 years of age or older. The median age was 38 years. For every 100 females, there were 87.3 males. For every 100 females age 18 and over, there were 86.9 males.

The median income for a household in the city was $24,792, and the median income for a family was $39,167. Males had a median income of $30,694 versus $19,792 for females. The per capita income for the city was $18,353. About 9.6% of families and 14.8% of the population were below the poverty line, including 15.6% of those under the age of eighteen and 16.0% of those 65 or over.

== Education ==
The community is served by Jackson Heights USD 335 public school district.

Whiting High School was closed through school unification. The Whiting High School mascot was Eagles.

== Notable people ==
- Anna Estelle Arnold (1879-1942), school teacher, administrator, textbook publisher

== See also ==
- Central Branch Union Pacific Railroad
