= Nellie M. Payne =

American entomologist and agricultural chemist

- Born: December 11, 1900; Cheyenne Wells, Colorado
- Died: July 19, 1990 (aged 89); Chicago
- Education: Kansas State Agricultural College, University of Minnesota
- Awards: National Research Council Fellow, Fellow of the Entomological Society of America
- Scientific career
- Fields: entomologist
- Workplaces: Lindenwood College, American Cyanamid

Nellie Maria de Cottrell Payne (December 11, 1900 – July 19, 1990) was an American entomologist and agricultural chemist. Her research on insect responses to low temperature had practical agricultural and environmental applications.

== Early life and education ==
Emily Maria de Cottrell Payne was born in 1900, in Cheyenne Wells, Colorado, daughter of James E. Payne Sr. and Mary Emmeline Cottrell Payne. Her father was superintendent of an agricultural station. She had two brothers, Amos and James. She earned a bachelor's (1920) and master's (1921) degrees in agricultural chemistry and entomology from the Kansas State Agricultural College, and a Ph.D. in 1925 from the University of Minnesota. Under the advisement of Royal N. Chapman in the Division of Entomology and Economic Zoology, her dissertation concerned the effects of low temperatures on insects.

== Career and research contributions ==
During her graduate studies, Payne taught briefly at Lindenwood College in Missouri. As a young scholar she spent several years as an editor and staff member at Biological Abstracts. She was named a National Research Council Fellow in 1925, to work in the zoology department at the University of Pennsylvania. From 1933 to 1937 Payne taught entomology at the University of Minnesota, while spending summers as a researcher at Woods Hole Marine Biological Laboratory. Her research at Woods Hole involved low temperature effects on invertebrates and the physiological effects of parasitoids on their hosts. Payne left academia in 1937, to be a researcher for American Cyanamid; in 1942 she shared a patent on an insecticide with fellow researcher Walter Ericks. She received a patent on another insecticide in 1949, as sole inventor. In 1957, she accepted a position with Velsicol Chemical Corporation, and stayed with them until her retirement in 1971.

In 1921, Payne was elected to membership in the American Association for the Advancement of Science, and in 1940 she was named a fellow of the Entomological Society of America. She was also an active member of the New York Academy of Sciences, was a National Research Council fellow in zoology at U. Pennsylvania (1925–27), a member of the American Chemical Society, and the American Society of Zoologists.

Payne conducted some of the seminal work on insect cold hardiness, including that on aquatic insects, Popillia japonica, and numerous forest insect pests. It continues to be cited as a foundation for later research.

== Personal life ==
Nellie Payne died at home in Chicago in 1990, age 89.
