= James Shanteau =

- Born: 1943 (age 82–83); Glendale, California, U.S.
- Occupation: American psychology professor

James Shanteau (born 1943) is an American professor and psychologist. He is co-developer of the Cochran-Weiss-Shanteau index of performance, which measures expert performance in the absence of an external standard.

Shanteau is a University Distinguished Professor in the Department of Psychology at Kansas State University. He is a recipient of the 2003 Commerce Bank Distinguished Graduate Faculty Award.

Shanteau received his Ph.D. in Experimental Psychology from the University of California, San Diego. He spent his entire academic career at Kansas State, during which he also held visiting appointments at the Universities of Michigan, Oregon, Colorado, Cornell, Toulouse, and the National Science Foundation. His research interests include studies of expertise (especially medical decision making) and studies of consumer health-care choices (especially organ donation and transplantation). Professor Shanteau has received over $5.9 million from agencies such as National Institute of Mental Health, Division of Organ Transplantation, National Institute of Child Health and Human Development, and National Science Foundation. His publications include over 65 articles in referred journals, 10 books, 62 book chapters, 6 encyclopedia entries, 7 monographs, 21 proceedings papers, 14 technical reports, and 3 computer programs. He served on grant-review panels for the National Institute of Health, Environmental Protection Agency, and National Science Foundation. He served on a National Research Council Committee to redefine intellectual disability standards, and on a DHHS Advisory Committee on Organ Transplantation. He is a Fellow of the American Psychological Association and a Charter Fellow of the American Psychological Society.

A list of publications can be found at Google Scholar, and links to some are also available online.
