= Anna Estelle Arnold =

Educator/Author

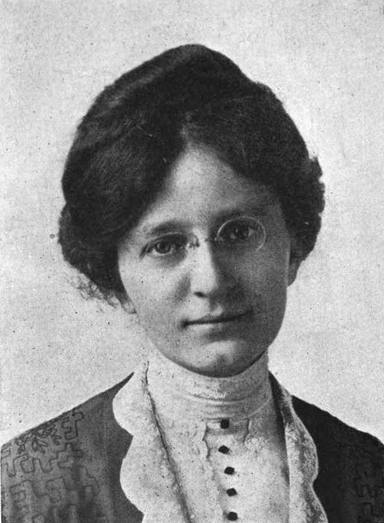
Anna Estelle Arnold

Anna Estelle Arnold (1879–1942) was an American school teacher and administrator from the U.S. state of Kansas who also published text books. She served as Superintendent of Schools of Chase County, Kansas. Her second textbook, A History of Kansas, was the first book printed under the state's then-new State Publication Law.

== Early years and education ==
Anna Estelle Arnold was born at Whiting, Jackson County, Kansas. As a small child, her parents moved to Chase County. She was a graduate of Kansas State University.

== Career ==
Arnold taught in the county's grade and high schools. In 1905, she became a candidate for Superintendent of Schools of Chase County. Her success and her unusual ability as a teacher were rewarded by a two to one majority on a close county ticket. At the second term, she had no opposition and out of 1214 votes cast, she received all but 29.

Arnold's Civics and Citizenship in 1912 was adopted as the state textbook on civil government for use in the public schools of Kansas. It was also used by a large number of women's clubs. Her second textbook, A History of Kansas, the first book printed under Kansas' new State Publication Law, was also adopted by the textbook commission. The book, of about 200 pages, was illustrated with reproductions of drawings of primitive implements and modes of living. About half of the book treated the history of the Kansas region before the State's admission to the Union. Brief accounts were given of Native Americans, frontier life, means of transportation, as well as economic and intellectual advancement.

== Selected works ==
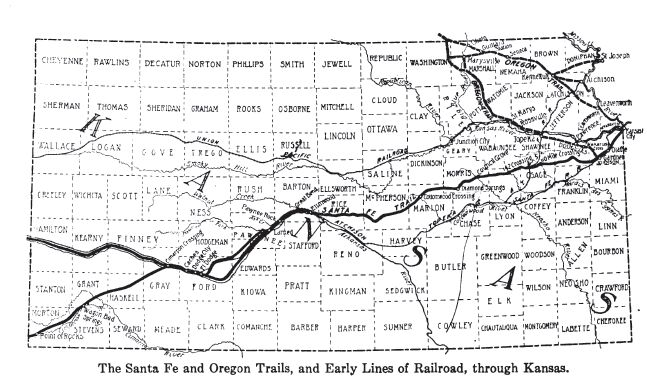
Kansas map, 1840–60, by Anna Estelle Arnold

- (1912), Civics and citizenship: a text-book for the boys and girls of Kansas
- (1914), A history of Kansas
- (1915), The counties of Kansas at the close of the Civil War (map)
