= Kevin Warren Sloan =

Landscape architect, urban planner and writer

- Born: December 8, 1957; Kansas City, Kansas
- Died: October 29, 2021 (aged 63)
- Education: Kansas State University, Syracuse University

Kevin Sloan was a landscape architect, urban planner and writer with international scope, located in Dallas, Texas. He was the founder and director of Kevin Sloan Studio, a design studio principally concerned with the urban design and landscape architectural problems generated by the metropolitan city and its new and unprecedented formation. He taught architecture, urban design and landscape architecture at a number of universities and colleges, including as a visiting professor at Syracuse University in Florence, Italy. He contributed numerous journal articles and is a former columnist on architecture and design for Dallas Downtown Business News.

Sloan’s built works encompass new prototypes, landscape systems and environmental strategies that address the ecology of the American Southwest and its similarities with North Africa – which share the same latitude. Works generally fall within the category of “landscape urbanism.” By transforming a typical street into “biofiltration machine,” at Urban Reserve Dallas he won international recognition from Eco-Structure magazine as one of seven notable environmental projects in 2009.

Sloan authored and championed the idea of the "DFW Branch Waters Network," an idea to organize the sprawling Dallas/Fort Worth metroplex around the area's underlying network of the Trinity Watershed. This would allow many existing neighborhoods to develop local parks, allowing a "re-wilding" of urban areas in select sections, and give new life to areas where new development could thrive. The Branch Waters would easily intersect with the existing and future hike and bike trail system, and expand the efforts of municipal and community groups interested in water quality, recreation, development and the natural environment. The idea includes taking part of the Trinity River floodplain and re-converting it to a Blackland Prairie wetland, providing a place for the wild animals who have moved back into the Metroplex, such as bobcats, alligators, coyotes, foxes, and all the birds that travel down the Central Migratory Flyway, making Dallas a haven for birders and wildlife educators. The 300+ miles of waterways in the DFW area could create a "natural" urban environment unique in the whole world.

Sloan specialized in, and conducted seminars on, “notational drawing,” an analytical drawing technique for measuring and diagramming world places, as the generative basis for new design works.

While earning a master of architecture from Syracuse University (1992), he won a graduate fellowship to study in Florence, Italy, and the Britton Medal for best architectural thesis project. He held a bachelor of landscape architecture from Kansas State University (1980).

Kevin Sloan Studio projects include a redesign of the landscape at the Botanical Research Institute of Texas; the Airfield Falls Conservation Park in Fort Worth, Texas; the urban design for Vitruvian Park, a 100-acre mixed use development in north Dallas; the master plan for a large mixed-use and public park project in Kansas City; the master plan and landscape architecture for the award-winning single-family development The Dallas Urban Reserve; and the master plan for the Southern Methodist University’s winning submission for the George W. Bush Presidential Library.

== Professional background ==
Sloan began his interest in the metropolitan city through large-scale works at prior firms. Formerly a vice president at Hillier Architecture, he was the firm’s national resource for site planning, landscape architecture and urban design. Projects completed individually while at Hillier include the Sprint World Headquarters, SABRE Corporate World Headquarters and a feasibility study for the Gettysburg National Park. Big Sky, Texas, a planning solution for a community on a prairie site, synthesized many of his interests prior to Kevin Sloan Studio.

International works while design director at HOK included urban additions to Cuernavaca, Mexico, and New Delhi, India. Urban projects included the urbanization of I-95 through Philadelphia and for the 1995 “Esplanade” planning study in Dallas that introduced the idea for a freeway park over an intercity highway that began construction in 2009.

Early works at Amphion – a firm made up of former Lawrence Halprin and Associate partners – led to his role as project designer for the Alamo Plaza Transit Mall, Omaha Riverfront Park and the Austin, Texas, Arboretum.

Sloan founded Kevin Sloan Studio in 2004.

== Athletic years ==
Prior to his professional life, Kevin Sloan was a track athlete and long jumper. At Topeka Hayden High School he established an All-Time state best (24’-6 3/4”) a record that stood for nearly 30 years. In his senior year, he won the long jump at the 1975 Golden West Invitational Track Meet in Sacramento, California (24’-8 1/2”) defeating Ken Carter of Brooklyn, New York (24’-5.”). The Golden West Invitational was considered to be the national high school track and field event at that time and has included the participation of athletes such as Terry Bradshaw, Bob Beamon and James Lofton.

Attending Kansas State University on a full athletic scholarship, he was coached by Deloss Dodds, who went on to be athletic director at KSU, and then athletic director at the University of Texas at Austin. In his freshman year at KSU, he set a new all-time university record, but a third-place finish at the 1976 USA junior meet in Knoxville, Tennessee, kept him from participating in the USA vs. USSR dual track meet in Moscow. In his collegiate years, Sloan won the long jump at events such as the Big Eight conference, Kansas Relays and Drake Relays in 1980 at 25’-7.” While red-shirted due to mononucleosis and competing “unattached,” he recorded a jump of 26 – 8 1/2” at a Wichita Invitational event in the spring of 1977. While qualifying for the 1980 Olympic Trials in Eugene, Oregon, Sloan retired from athletics to pursue his architectural interests, after President Jimmy Carter canceled US participation, due to the Russian invasion of Afghanistan.

== Death and legacy ==
Sloan died of brain cancer on Oct. 29, 2021. A few weeks before his death, the Park and Recreation Board of the City of Dallas voted to name a planned park, which he designed in his own neighborhood, after him. The park replaces a "connector" street that routed traffic through a residential area. Sloan, a proponent of the Rewilding movement, encouraged people to get into nature, use nature-friendly practices in their own homes, parks, and cities, and get involved politically to make sweeping changes.

== Publications ==
Simek, Peter (July 2017). "Waterworld." D magazine, pp. 152-155.

Sloan, Kevin (October 18, 2017). "Dallas Must Do More to Guard Against Natural Disaster."

Sloan, Kevin (August 18, 2017). "Urban Development Is Successful Only When It Blends New Construction with Existing Structure." Dallas Morning News.

Sloan, Kevin (June 1, 2017). "What Does a Close Look at Dallas Tell Us About Our Priorities?" Dallas Morning News.

Baker, Sandra (April 23, 2017). "Want to see the largest waterfall in Tarrant County? Now it's easy to find." Star-Telegram, p. 1B.

Sloan, Kevin (March 2017). "Go with the Flow." D magazine, pp. 88-91.

Sloan, Kevin (March/April 2017). "Waterway Urbanism." Texas Architect, pp. 69-75.

Sloan, Kevin (February 26, 2017). "Region's Waterways Could Be Its Charm." The Dallas Morning News, p. P1.

Sayer, Jason (October 12, 2016). "Welcome to the Jungle." The Architect's Newspaper, p. 19.

Sloan, Kevin (Summer 2016). "Dr. Peter Weller: The Man Behind RoboCop." Columns, pp. 18-22.

Schuler, Timothy A. (April 2016). "Make No Plans." Landscape Architecture, pp. 24–26.

Sloan, Kevin (March/April 2015). "Traffic in Reverse Engineering." Texas Architect, pp. 35–37.

Sloan, Kevin (Fall 2013). "The Changing Face of Architecture-Relevance in Transition." Columns, pp. 16–21.

Sloan, Kevin (July/August 2013). "Made in the Shade." Texas Architect, pp. 40–45.

Richards, James (2013). "Freehand Drawing & Discovery." pub. John Wiley & Sons, pp. 46–49

Sloan, Kevin (January/February 2012). "An Ordered Approach." Texas Architect, pp. 41–47

Sloan, Kevin (Summer 2011). "Un espacio movil." Arquine, p. 22-25.

Martin, Frank Edgerton (September 2010). "Farmland Gone Broadband." Landscape Architecture, pp. 164–177.

Ibanez, Gregory (July/August 2009). “Suburban Revolution.” Texas Architect, p. 28-32.

Grant, Laurie (July/August 2009). “Innovative Green Projects 2009.” Eco-structure, p. 32.

Sloan, Kevin (September 2008). “Memory Loss.” Landscape Architecture, pp. 144–143.

Thompson, J. William, FASLA (November 2003). “Drawn to See.” Landscape Architecture, cover, pp. 100–105.

Dillon, David (December 28, 2001). “Top Ten Architecture Events.” The Dallas Morning News, Section E, p. 1, 5.

Steiner, Frederick, (November/December, 2002). “Can Urban Design Heal the Trinity?” Landscape Architecture, pp. 22–25.

Dillon, David (September 22, 2001). “Urbane Renewal: This Year’s AIA Award Winners Share a Decidedly Fresh Approach to Design.” The Dallas Morning News, Section E, p. 1, 4.

Martin, Frank Edgerton (August 2001). “The City That Stands Alone.” Landscape Architecture, pp. 75–83.

Sloan, Kevin (August 2001). “The Grotto Fountain.” Landscape Architecture, pp. 26–28.

Wen, Howard (March 1999). “Suburban Renewal at Big Sky.” Texas Monthly, pp. 66–77.

Chadderdon, Lisa (August 1998). “Nortel Switches Cities.” Fast Company, p. 112.

Robinson, Gayle (August 1998). “Big Sky, Texas.” Fort Worth Star Telegram, Section D, pp. 1–4.

Dillon, David (August 23, 1998). “Homes on the Prairie.” The Dallas Morning News, Section D, pp. 1–4.

Ibanez, Greg (September/October 2003). “Seminal Assemblies,” Texas Architect, pp. 21, p. 58.

Sloan, Kevin and Levy, Max (July/August 1998). “Plain Presence.” Texas Architect, pp. 40–41.

Germany, Lisa (September 1999). “Prairie Music.” Landscape Architecture, pp. 36–40.

Thompson, J. William, FASLA (January 1994). “A Passage to Yucatán.” Landscape Architecture, cover, pp 64–71.

(May 1993). “Drawing.” Landscape Architecture, p. 61.

Gunderson, Mark (September/October 2000). “Light Settling on the Plains." Texas Architect, pp. 36–37.

Robinette, Gary O. (1984). "Water Conservation in Landscape Design and Management." pub. Van Nostram Reinhold, illustrated by Kevin W. Sloan.
