= Darcy Pattison =

American writer (born 1954)

Darcy S. Pattison (born June 28, 1954) is an American writer of fiction and nonfiction children's literature, a blogger, writing teacher, and indie publisher. Her books have been translated into eleven languages. Although she is best known for her work in children's literature, she is also a writing teacher traveling across the nation presenting her Novel Revision Retreat. She has been featured as a writer and writing teacher in prestigious publications such as Writing Young Adult Fiction For Dummies, and 2012 Writer's Market. Pattison is also an independent publisher of ebooks for adults in the educational market.

She is the 2007 recipient of the Arkansas Governor's Art Award for Individual Artist, and a member of the Authors Guild.

== Personal life ==
Darcy Pattison is married and has four children. Her hobby is quilting. She is a member of International Quilters Association, American Quilters Society, Author's Guild, Arkansas Quilter's Guild. Exhibitions: Arkansas Art Center, Regional Craft Biennial, two times (quilts). Darcy's quilts have been shown nationally and her quilt, "Houses and Stars" is the cover quilt for the September, 1991 Quilting Today magazine. Twice her quilts hung in the seven-state, Regional Craft Biennial at the Arkansas Art Center and her award-winning quilt was in the Great Arkansas Quilt Show 2002; her daughter's wedding quilt hung in the Great Arkansas Quilt Show II, 2007–8.

== Education ==
University of Arkansas, Fayetteville, B.A.; Kansas State University, M.A.

== Works ==
=== Young Adult/Teen Fiction ===
- The Blue Planets World Series (2017)
  - Envoys, prequel
  - Sleepers, Book 1
  - Sirens, Book 2
  - Pilgrims, Book 3

=== Fiction Novels for children ===
- Got Me a Cat, illustrated by Kyle McBride. (Mims House, 2022)
- Liberty (Mims House, 2016)
- The Aliens, Inc. Series
  - Kell, the Alien. Aliens, Inc. Series, Book 1. Illustrated by Rich Davis. (Mims House, 2014) Publishers Weekly review
  - Kell and the Horse Apple Parade. Aliens, Inc. Series, Book 2. Illustrated by Rich Davis. (Mims House, 2014)
  - Kell and the Giants. Aliens, Inc. Series, Book 3. Illustrated by Rich Davis. (Mims House, 2014)
  - Kell and the Detectives. Aliens, Inc. Series, Book 4. Illustrated by Rich Davis. (Mims House, 2015) School Library Journal review
- Longing for Normal (Mims House, 2015) Booklist Online Review
- Gargoyle: A Tale of Two Miracles (Mims House, 2014)
- Saucy and Bubba: A Hansel and Gretel Tale (Mims House, 2014).
- Vagabonds (Mims House, 2014).
- THE HEARTLAND SERIES
  - The Wayfinder (Greenwillow Books, 2000, republished by Mims House, 2019.), a middle-grade fantasy novel. Winchal Eldras goes on a quest for healing both for himself and for his land. Reviewed in SLJ, Booklist, BCCB, Horn Book, VOYA and Locus. Translated into Spanish, El buscador de camino. State award reading lists:

=== Fiction Picture Books for Children ===
- Finding Courage
- Goldilocks, the Name Fame Dame
- The Kittytubers Series
  - When Kittens Go Viral, Book 1
  - The Kitten Stars, Book 2
  - Kittywood, Book 3
  - Kitten Friends: Quincy's Story, Book 4
  - Kitten Friends: PittyPat's Story, Book 5
- The Read and Write Series
  - I Want a Dog: My Opinion Essay, Book 1 (Mims House, 2015)
  - I Want a Cat: My Opinion Essay, Book 2 (Mims House, 2015)
  - My Crazy Dog: My Narrative Essay, Book 3 (Mims House, 2016)
  - My Dirty Dog: My Informative Essay, Book 3 (Mims House, 2018)
- "Rowdy, the Pirate Who Could Not Sleep" (Mims House, 2016)
- 11 Ways to Ruin a Photograph: Winner of "The Help" Children's Story Contest. (Mims House, 2011) A girl decides it is not a family photo album while Dad is gone soldiering.
- The Scary Slopes, (My First Graphic Novel series, Stone Arch Books, Jan., 2011 ISBN 9781434225344). Snowboarding fun.
- 19 Girls and Me, (Philomel, 2006), illustrated by Steven Salerno, about friendship in a kindergarten class. Translated into Chinese (Commonwealth Magazine Co./Taiwan), Arabic (Dar El Shorouk/Egypt) and German. Reviewed in Kirkus, Publishers Weekly, the School Library Journal, Childhood Education. Children's Book of the Month Club selection.
- Searching for Oliver K. Woodman (Harcourt, 2005), a picture book illustrated by Joe Cepeda. When Oliver is missing for sixty days, his friends send Imogene Poplar, P.I.–a wooden woman–to find him. Reviewed in Kirkus, PW, BCCB, SLJ, Booklist. 2007-8 Arkansas Diamond Award Reading list.
- The Journey of Oliver K. Woodman (Harcourt Inc., 2003), a picture book illustrated by Joe Cepeda . A wooden man travels across the United States to connect a family. Reviewed in PW, SLJ, BCCB, Booklist, and Horn Book. *Starred reviews in Kirkus and CCBC. Booklist review Autumn 2003 Children's Booksense 76. Child and Nick Jr. Family Magazine Best Books of the Year 2003. Irma S. and James H. Black Picture Book Award Honor Book. Nutmeg Media Children's Picture Books on Video, June 2005; 2006 ALA Notable Video. 2008 Houghton Mifflin reading series. Paperback version, spring, 2009. The Journey of Oliver K. Woodman was adapted as a video by Nutmeg Media and was a 2006 ALA Notable Video (, May, 2005).
- The River Dragon, a picture book illustrated by Jean and Mou-sien Tseng,(Lothrop, Lee & Shepard 1991) Translated into Swedish, Danish & Norwegian. ABA Pick of the Lists 1991. Reviewed by PW, SLJ, Childhood Education, Instructor Magazine.

=== Non fiction for children ===
- Not Extinct: The Przewalski's Horse's Return from Extinct in the Wild (Mims House 2025)
- Be Strong: The Rise of the Beloved Public Arts Sculptor Nancy Schön, illustrated by Rich Davis, (Mims House 2024)
- I Am the Thirsty Desert, illustrated by Jordan Kim, Mims House, 2023. 2023 Eureka! Nonfiction Honor Book (California Reading Association)
- George Washington's Engineer: How Rufus Putnam Won the Siege of Boston Without Firing a Shot, illustrated by Terry Kole, (Mims House 2023). 2024 Best STEM Book from National Science Teaching Association.
- Field Notebooks: How Scientists Record and Write About Observations, (Mims House, 2021)
- A LITTLE BIT OF DINOSAUR SERIES
  - A Little Bit of Dinosaur by Elleen Hutcheson and Darcy Pattison. (Mims House, 2021)

Starred Kirkus Review, 2021 Arkansiana Award, Eureka! Nonfiction Honor (California Reading Assn.)

  - A Little Bit of This Dinosaur (Mims House, 2023)
  - A Little Bit of That Dinosaur (Mims House, 2023)
- The Wonder of Christmas: 25 Days of Advent Journaling for Girls, by Shanna Noel, with Darcy

Pattison. (Dayspring Books, 2019)

- MOMENTS IN SCIENCE series, illustrated by Peter Willis
  - Burn: Michael Faraday's Candle (Mims House 2016), Korean rights to DaBom Publishing. Chinese rights to FLTRP.
  - Clang! Ernst Chladni's Sound Figures. (Mims House, 2018). 2019 NSTA Outstanding Science Trade Book. Korean rights to DaBom Publishing. Chinese rights to FLTRP.
  - Pollen: Darwin's 130-year Prediction (Mims House, 2019). Starred Kirkus review, Junior Library Guild selection, Eureka! Honor Book (California Reading Association). 2020 NSTA Outstanding Science Trade Book. Korean rights to DaBom Publishing. Chinese rights to FLTRP.
  - Eclipse: How the 1919 Solar Eclipse Proved Einstein's Theory of General Relativity (Mims House, 2019). Korean rights to DaBom Publishing. Chinese rights to FLTRP.
  - Erosion: How Hugh Bennett Saved America's Soil and Stopped the Dust Bowl (Mims House, 2020). 2021 NSSTA Notable Social Studies Book. Korean rights to DaBom Publishing. Chinese rights to FLTRP.
  - A.I. How Patterns Helped Artificial Intelligence Defeat World Champion Lee Sedol (Mims House, 2021). Korean rights to DaBom Publishing. Chinese rights to FLTRP.
  - FEVER: How Tu YouYou Adapted Traditional Chinese Medicine to Find a Cure for Malaria (Mims House, 2022). Chinese rights to FLTRP.
  - AQUARIUM: How Jeannette Powers Invented the Aquarium to Study Marine Animals (Mims House, 2023). Chinese rights to FLTRP.
  - MAGNET: How William Gilbert Discovered that the Earth is a Great Magnet (Mims House, 2024). Chinese rights to FLTRP.
  - CLIMATE: How Vladimir Koppen Studied Weather and Drew the First Climate Maps (Mims House, 2025)
- The Nantucket Sea Monster: A Fake News Story. Illustrated by Peter Willis, Mims House 2017. Junior Library

Guild Selection, 2018 NCTE Notable Children's Book in Language Arts. Korean Rights to Darim Publishing.

- My STEAM Notebook: 150 Years of Primary Source Documents for American Scientists

Workbook for science notebooks, Spring 2017. With Photos from the Smithsonian.

- ANOTHER EXTRAORDINARY ANIMAL SERIES
  - Jeremy, the English Garden Snail, illustrated by Olga Gonina, (Mims House, 2025)
  - Pelorus Jack, the New Zealand Porpoise, illustrated by Eva Dooley, (Mims House, 2024)
  - Diego, the Galapagos Giant Tortoise: Saving a Species from Extinction, illustrated by Amanda Zimmerman, (Mims House, 2022). Starred Kirkus Review.
  - Rosie the Ribeter: The Celebrated Jumping Frog of Calaveras County. Illustrated by Nathaniel Gold, (Mims House, 2018).
  - Nefertiti, the Spidernaut: How a Jumping Spider Learned to Hunt in Space. Illustrated by Valeria Tisnes, (Mims House, 2017). Alabama Camellia Children's Choice Book Award 2016-17 List. 2017 NSTA Outstanding Science Trade Book.
  - Abayomi, the Brazilian Puma: The True Story of an Orphaned Cub Illustrated by Kitty Harvill, (Mims House, 2014). 2015 NSTA Outstanding Science Trade Book. Translated into Portuguese/Brazil.
  - Wisdom, the Midway Albatross. Illustrated by Kitty Harvill., (Mims House, 2012). Starred review in Publishers Weekly. Interviewed by Laurie Thompson.
- Desert Baths (Sylvan Dell Publishers, 2012). 24-hours of baths by desert animals. It was named a 2013 Outstanding Science Trade Book by the NSTA and CBC Reviewed in Kirkus.
- Prairie Storms (Sylvan Dell Publishers, 2011). A year of storms for the prairie animals. Reviewed in Kirkus, BookLoons, and SLJ.

=== Non fiction for adults ===
- Publish: Find Surprising Success Self-Publishing Your Children's Book, (Mims House, 2026)
- Writing for the Common Core: Writing, Speaking and Listening Activities Aligned with the Common Core (Mims House, 2014)
- Start Your Novel: Six Winning Steps Toward a Compelling Opening Line, Scene and Chapter (Mims House, 2013).
- What is Common Core? (Mims House, 2013).
- Common Core ELA Activities: Month by Month Writing, Speaking and Listening Activities Aligned with the Common Core, (Mims House, 2012).
- Paper Lightning: Sparking Student Brainstorming for Effective Pre-writing (Prufrock Press, 2008). A teacher-resource book about pre-writing strategies.
- Novel Metamorphosis: Uncommon Ways to Revise (Mims House, 2008). A novel revision workbook.

=== Ebooks for adults ===
- How to Write a Children's Picture Book (Mims House, 2010)
- The Book Trailer Manual (Mims House, 2010)

== Speaker ==
Pattison has presented at the National Teachers of English national conference, the American Library Association national conference, the Society of Children's Bookwriters and Illustrators national conferences and numerous local and regional conference. In 1999, she created the Novel Revision retreat and has taught it across the United States. She participated in the 2012 and 2013 Authors for Earth Day program.
