= Kevin Rabas =

American poet

- Education: University of Missouri–Kansas City (BA); Kansas State University (MA); University of Kansas (PhD)
- Occupations: Poet; professor; jazz musician

Kevin Rabas is an American poet, professor and jazz musician. He is the author of two collections of poetry, the co-director of the Creative Writing Program at Emporia State University, co-edits a literary magazine, and was the winner of the Langston Hughes Award for Poetry.

== Education ==
Rabas received a PhD in English from the University of Kansas in 2007; his dissertation is titled Against Gravity: Last Road Trip (poems) and Sidewalk Drum (a play): A Creative Dissertation. He received an MFA in creative writing from Goddard College in 2002, an MA in English from Kansas State University with an emphasis in creative writing in 1998, and a BA in English with an emphasis in creative writing and journalism from the University of Missouri–Kansas City in 1995.

== Recognition ==
Rabas's collection of poetry, entitled "Lisa's Flying Electric Piano," won many accolades, including the Nelson Poetry Book Award from the Kansas Authors Club, the 2010 Kansas Notable Book Award by the Great Plains Center for the Book, and was a finalist in the Sr. Madeleine Kisner Prize in Poetry from Newman University. Three of his poems ("Bird's Horn," "Artt Frank's Speed Bag", and "Eden, or "Lucas, Kansas") were nominated for the Pushcart Prize by Brian Daldorph of the Coal City Review. He won the Langston Hughes Poetry Award from the Lawrence Arts Center, the Kansas Voices Award in 2005 and 2007, and the New Voice Award from the Salina Poetry Series in 2003.

== Career ==
=== Publications ===
Rabas has had short stories published in multiple magazines. Rabas' poetry recordings include Last Road Trip (2002), a jazz poetry CD featuring Rabas reading original poetry and drumming, with Josh Schlar on saxophone.

=== Playwright ===
As a playwright, Rabas' work includes "Elizabeth," a full production staged at the North Park Playwright Festival in San Diego, a full production of "Elves," at the EMU Theatre, Lawrence Arts Center and the publication of "After the Head Injury: A Dialogue" in Kansas English. His creative non-fiction story, "Play Out," was published in Jazz Ambassador Magazine. He co-directed a short documentary, "Don Jaffe: Jazz Poet", which was directed and filmed by Max McCoy for the Kansas City Filmmakers Jubilee in 2008. He has written numerous reviews, interviews and profiles of writers and musicians.

=== Editing work ===
Rabas has served as co-editor of Flint Hills Review since 2008. He edited several books of poetry and fiction published by Woodley Press, including Burn by Kathleen Johnson in 2008, Ghost Stories of the American West by Denise Low in 2010, and Fugitive Histories by Harley Elliott and Certain Dawn by Tasha Haas.

=== Music ===
In addition to teaching and writing, he performs regularly with musicians, combining his poetry with jazz and funk music. Rabas is a jazz musician who specializes mostly in percussion and drumming. Rabas cites music as a constant source of inspiration to his poetry.
