= Imam Prasodjo =

Indonesian social scientist and academic (born 1960)

- Born: Imam Budidarmawan Prasodjo; February 15, 1960 (age 66); Purwokerto, Central Java, Indonesia
- Citizenship: Indonesia
- Education: University of Indonesia (BA); Kansas State University (MA); Brown University (PhD)
- Scientific career
- Fields: Sociology
- Workplaces: University of Indonesia
- Thesis: The Effect of Population Mobility on the Risk of Infant Death: The Indonesian Experience (1997)

Imam Prasodjo is an Indonesian social scientist and academic. He is currently a professor at the Department of Social and Political Science at the University of Indonesia. He earned his bachelor's degree from the University of Indonesia, his master's degree from Kansas State University, and his doctorate from Brown University.

Prasodjo has also been noted as a social activist. He has advocated for Indonesians to learn foreign languages despite fears that doing so would be unpatriotic, suggesting instead that Indonesia strives for more development in science and technology so other countries will also learn Indonesian. He was also responsible for social mapping of Jakarta's child-friendly integrated public spaces, publicly cautioning against former governor Basuki Tjahaja Purnama's restriction of local residents from participation in management decisions regarding the spaces.
