= Elieser Posner =

Grain Science specialist (born 1937)

Elieser Salman Posner (born 18 October 1937) is a specialist in Grain Science. He holds a PhD in Grain Science & Industry from Kansas State University.

== Education ==
1960 Swiss Milling School, Graduated with honors.

1969 Milling Science & Management, Kansas State University, B.Sc.

1970 Grain Science, Kansas State University, M.Sc.

1985 Grain Science, Kansas State University, Ph.D.

== Career ==
Following 25 years of work in the flour milling industry, Posner joined the academia to initiate research of wheat processing at Kansas State University.

Between the years 1986 and 1991, Posner served as a tenured associate professor in the Department of Grain Science at Kansas State University. Research interest while at Kansas State University that were integrated into new courses, related to developments in wheat flour milling, operation modeling, air handling in the milling industry, and air-classification. Between 1983 & 1986 Consulted UNCTAD in the Caribbean & West Africa. Between 1986 & 1991 initiated and developed professional activities between the USSR All Grain Institute and the Department of Grain Science & Industry at Kansas State University.

Posner has published numerous scientific papers, book chapters, and books. He has also performed research on wheat flour milling and contributed to various encyclopedias and books on the topic of food and grain processing. In January 2002, Posner worked as a member of a delegation that facilitated the first U.S. Wheat (USW) shipment to Cuba in 40 years. In addition, Posner and USW regional vice president Mitch Skalicky met with leaders of the Cuban milling sector and provided technical assistance.

In 1997, he co-authored a book called Wheat Flour Milling which discussed new ideas and approaches to wheat flour milling including raw material, storage, blending, cleaning, milling, conditioning, grinding, sieving, purification, mill design, process control and maintenance as well as food safety, hygiene and mill management. A 2nd Edition was published in 2004.

Research interest relates to developments in wheat flour milling. While at Kansas State University, supervised and co-supervised of MSc and PhD graduate students whose work related to wheat quality, and processing technology. Since departing from Kansas State University, Posner served on advisory committees to graduate students in Australia, USA, & Brazil.

Posner consults on grain processing and wheat flour milling to national, public and private organizations in North and South America as well as the Far and Middle East. Since 1992 he has aided multiple organizations in upgrading milling systems, optimizing yield and performance, new construction, and conducting in-plant milling short courses to improve staff knowledge. Posner was instrumental in setting up flour milling schools in Fortaleza Brazil, Puerto Cabello Venezuela, Cairo Egypt, and Casablanca Morocco. Consulted in the construction of the world first dedicated flour mill to manufacture Matza flour. During 2019 Posner conducted a four-month short course to Israeli millers, sponsored by the Israeli Industrial Association.

== Early Work Chronology ==
Miller, Ein-Chay Flour Mills Ltd. Kfar-Saba, Israel - 1957-1958

Technician, Miag, Germany and Buhler, Switzerland. - 1958-1959

Both companies are involved in equipment construction and plant assembly for flour mills and food processing. The candidate received first hand experience in construction of flour mills.

Miller, MeNeBa Flour Mills, Rotterdam, Holland. - 1960-1961 (One of the largest flour mills in Europe). Worked as shift miller and as a Laboratory Technician.

Miller, Hamashbir Flour Mills, Tel-Aviv, Israel. - 1961-1963 Experience as a technician in modernization of the mill, and after commissioning of the mill as a miller.

Head Miller, Hasharon Flour Mills, Petach-Tikwa, - 1963-1966 Israel. Responsible for the total plant operation and for upgrading of its technology.

Assistant Superintendent, Peavy Co., Hastings, MN. - 1970-1972 Involved in the construction of a new durum mill, and upon commissioning of the mill became responsible for its operation.

Project Engineer, Osem Ltd., Bnei-Brak, Israel. - 1972-1973 Responsible for planning and construction of a new pasta plant.

Managing Director, Ein-chay Flour Mills Ltd., - 1973-1983 Kfar-Saba, Israel. Responsible for the economic soundness and technical level of the operation. Responsibilities included developing the company and diversifying various lines in flour milling and the food business. Responsible for modernization of the operation and upgrading its competence.

== Patents ==
Posner has awarded the following U.S. Patents:

- Posner, E. S. and Li, Y. 1991. Method of Separating Wheat Germ from Whole Wheat. U.S. Patent 4,986,997.
- Posner, E. S., Q. Zhuge, and P. Seib. 1992. Process for Dry Milling of Wheat to Obtain Gluten and Starch. U.S. Patent 5,164,013.
- Posner, E., Boatwright, M., Wetzel, D. 2023. Method for Optimizing Milling Process Using Chemical Imaging. U.S. Patent 11,684,930.

== List of Publications ==
Posner has published numerous scientific papers and books.

=== Books ===
- Wheat Flour Milling, 2nd Ed (2004) E. S. Posner, A. N. Hibbs, American Association of Cereal Chemists, 489 pages (Illustrated) ISBN 1-891127-40-3
- Wheat Flour Milling, 1st Ed (1997) E. S. Posner, A. N. Hibbs, American Association of Cereal Chemists, 341 pages (Illustrated) ISBN 0-913250-93-7

=== Chapters ===
- Posner, E.S,. 1993. Principles of Milling. Encyclopedia of Food Science, Food Technology and Nutrition. Book Chapter. Academic Press, Harcourt Brace Jovanovich, Publishers. London.
- Posner, E.S., 2000. Wheat. In Handbook of Cereal Science and Technology. Second edition. K. Kulp and J. Ponte Jr. eds., Marcel Dekker, Inc. New York, pp. 1 – 29.
- Posner, E.S,. 2003. Principles of Milling. Encyclopedia of Food Science, Food Technology and Nutrition. Book Chapter. Academic Press, Harcourt Brace Jovanovich, Publishers. London.
- Posner, E.S,. 2003. Mill Products. Encyclopedia of Food Science, Food Technology and Nutrition. Book Chapter. Academic Press, Harcourt Brace Jovanovich, Publishers. London.
- Posner E.S. 2009. “Wheat Milling” in Wheat – Chemistry and Technology. 4th Edition. Published by the American Association of Cereal Chemists. St. Paul, Minnesota, U.S.A.

=== Articles ===
- Posner, E., Ward, A. B., Niernberger, F. F. (1974). Evaluation of Wheat Tempering and Blending Methods of Hard Winter Wheats Under Experimental Conditions. Bulletin - Association of Operative Millers, 3425.
- Liu, R., Z. Liang, E. S. Posner, and J. G. Ponte Jr. (1985). A Technique to Improve Functionality of Flour From Sprouted Wheat. Cereal Foods World 31:7,471.
- Posner, E. S., Wetzel, D. L. (1986). Control of Flour Mills By NIR On-Line Monitoring. Association of Operative Millers - Bulletin, 4711.
- Posner, E. S. and C. W. Deyoe, (1986). Changes in Milling Properties of New Harvested Hard Wheat During Storage. Cereal Chemistry 63(5):451-456.
- Kim, H. I., Seib, P. A., Posner, E. S., Deyoe, C. W., Yang, H. C. (1986). Milling Hard Red Winter Wheat to Farina. Cooking Quality and Color of Farina Spaghetti Compared to Semolina Spaghetti. Cereal Foods World. 31:11,810.
- Posner, E. S. (1987) Reduction of Wheat Tempering Time Before Milling. Cereal Foods World 32:12,886.
- Li, Y. Z. and E. S. Posner (1987). The Influence of Kernel Size on Wheat Millability. A.O.M. Bulletin. 5089–5098.
- Q. Zhuge, E. S. Posner, and C. W. Deyoe. (1988). Production Study of a Low Gossypol Protein Product From Cottonseed Meal. Journal of Agricultural and Food Chemistry 36,153.
- Posner, E. S. (1988). Back to the Issue of Wheat Grading. Cereal Foods World 33:4,362.
- Shyam, M. P. and E. S. Posner. (1988). A Study Documenting Reduction of Tempering Time by Fissuring and Its Effect on Milling. A.O.M. Bulletin., April.
- El Bouziri, M. and E. S. Posner. (1989) Farina Milling: Development of an Experimental Flow Sheet and a Speck Counting Method. A.O.M. Bulletin. February 5393–5401.
- Kim, H. I., P. A. Seib, E. S. Posner, C. W. Deyoe and H. C. Yang. 1989. Spaghetti from Kansas Hard Winter Wheat; Improving its Color and Cooking Quality. Cereal Foods World. 34:2, 216.
- Y. Z. Li and E. S. Posner. 1989. An Experimental Milling Technique for Various Flour Extraction Levels. Cereal Chem. 66(4):324-328.
- Li, Y. and E. S. Posner. 1989. Determination of Wheat Milling Potential and its Influence on Flour Quality Deterioration Rate. Cereal Chem. 66(5):362-365.
- Shyam, M. P. and E. S. Posner. 1990. A Study Evaluating the Flow Properties of Dry Tempered, and Fissured Yacora Rojo Wheat. A.O.M. Bulletin. July 5737–5742.
- Ranhotra, G. S., J. A. Gelroth, K. Astroth, and E. S. Posner. 1990. Distribution of Total and Soluble Fiber in Various Millstreams of Wheat. J. of Food Sci. 55(5)1349-1351.
- Posner, E. S. and Li, Y. 1991. Technique for Separation of Wheat Germ by Impacting and Subsequent Grinding. J. of Cereal Sci. 13:49-70.
- Flores, R. A., Posner, E. S., and Deyoe, C. W. 1991. Evaluation of a Laboratory Dockage Removal Device. Cereal Foods World 36(6):513-516.
- Posner, E. S. 1991. Mechanical Separation of High Dietary Fiber from Wheat Bran. Cereal Foods World 36(7):553-556.
- Posner, E. S. 1991. Wheat and Flour Ash as a Measure of Millability. Cereal Foods World 36(8):626-628.
- Zhuge, Q., Persaud, J., Posner, E. S., Deyoe, C. W., Seib, P., and Chung, D. 1991. Isolation of Gluten and Starch from ground, Pearled Wheat Compared to Isolation from Flour. Cereal Chem. 68(4):336-339.
- Ranhotra, G. S., Gelroth, J. A., Glaser, B. K. and Posner, E. S. 1992. Total and soluble fiber content of air-classified white flour from hard and soft wheats. Cereal Chem. 69(1):75-77.
- Flores, R. A., Posner, E. S., Milliken, G. A., and Deyoe, C. W., 1991. Modeling the milling of hard red winter wheat: Estimation of cumulative ash and protein recovery. Transactions of the ASAE 34(5): 2117–2122.
- Liu, M. C., R.S. Flores, C.W. Deyoe, and E.S. Posner, 1992. Assessment of a computer simulation model for the flour-milling industry. Cereal Foods World. 37(8):649-654.
- Flores, R.A., E.S. Posner, and C.W. Deyoe. 1992. Computer simulation model for wheat flour milling systems. Association of Operative Millers Bulletin. August. 6079–6090.
- Qarooni, J., Ponte, J.G. Jr. and Posner, E.S., 1992. Production of flour tortilla with Kansas hard white and Pacific North soft white winter wheat. Association of Operative Millers - Bulletin, October 6112–6115.
- Qarooni, J., Ponte, J.G. Jr. and Posner, E.S., 1992. Test baking procedure for evaluating flour tortilla quality. Association of Operative Millers - Bulletin, December 6136–6138.
- Qarooni, J., Ponte, J.G. Jr. and Posner, E.S., 1992. Flat Breads of the world. Cereal Foods World. 37(12):863-865.
- J. Qarooni, E.S. Posner, and J.G. Ponte Jr. 1993. Production of pita bread with hard white and other U.S. wheats. Association of Operative Millers – Bulletin. Aug., p. 6264-6269.
- Qarooni, J., E. S. Posner, and J. G. Ponte Jr. 1993. Production of Pita Bread with Hard White and Other U.S. Wheats. Lebensm. -Wiss. u. -Technol. 26, 93–99.
- Qarooni, J., E. S. Posner, and J. G. Ponte Jr. 1993. Production of Tanoor Bread with Hard White and Other U.S. Wheats. Lebensm. -Wiss. u. -Technol. 26, 100–106.
- Flores, R.A., E.S. Posner, R. Phillips, and C.W. Deyoe. 1993. Modeling the Economic Evaluation of Wheat Flour Milling Operations. Transactions of the American Society of Agricultural Engineers (ASAE). 36(4):1143-1149.
- Shen, L., Haque, E., and Posner, E., 1994. Saltation Velocity of Wheat Materials in Horizontal Flow. Transactions of the ASAE. American Society of Agricultural Engineers. 37(2):577-580.
- Negrini, O., C.K. Spillman, Y.J. Wang, D.S. Chung, J.L. Steele and E. Posner, 1994. Evaluation of Laboratory Grain Cleaning and Separating Equipment - Part II. Transactions of the ASAE. American Society of Agricultural Engineers. 37(2):577-580.
- Villanueva, R.M., Leong, M.H., Posner, E.S., and Ponte, J.G. Jr. 2001. Split milling of wheat for diverse end-use products. Cereal Food World. 46(8):363-369.
- E. Posner, B. Fernandez and D. S. Huang 2006. Desert durum wheat provides high-quality extraction and pasta products. Cereal Food World. 51(5):268-272.
- Elieser Posner, 2009. The relative technical and economic value of wheat to a mill. World Grain, 27(9):50, 52–54.
- D. L. Wetzel, E.S. Posner, and H. Dogan. 2010. InSb focal plane array chemical imaging enables assessment of unit process efficiency for milling operation. Applied Spectroscopy. 64(12):1320-1324.
- Bonfil, D.J., and Posner, E.S., 2012. Can bread wheat quality be determined by gluten index? Journal of Cereal Science. 56: 115–118.
- Elieser S. Posner, Ana A. Chew-Guevara, Marcelo Mitre-Dieste, Esther Perez-Carrillo, Erick Heredia-Olea, Jeff D. Wilson, and Sergio O. Serna-Saldivar, 2014. Generation of a Mixolab Profile After the Evaluation of the Functionality of Different Commercial Wheat Flours for Hot-Press Tortilla Production. Cereal Chemistry, 91(2):139-145.
- E.S. Posner, and R.C. Hoseney, 2015. A century of advances in milling and baking. Cereal Foods World. 60(3):148-153
- Boatwright, M.D., Posner, E.S., Lopes, R., and Wetzel, D.L., 2015. Purity of commercial mill streams preceded by debranning using quantitative chemical imaging. Cereal Foods World. 60 (5):211-216.
- Lopes, R.B., Posner, E. S., Alberti, A., and Demiate, I. M., 2022. Pre milling debranning of wheat with a commercial system to improve flour quality. Journal of Food Science & Technology. 50(3881-3887).
- Lopes, R.B. Posner, E.S. 2023. Methods in flour mill analysis and adjustment. World Grain, June, 74–77.
- Posner, E.S. 2025. Methods to increase extraction and efficiency. World Grain, April, 46-47.
- Lopes, R.B. Bach, D., Salem, R.D.S., Reyes-Ja`quez, D., Delgado, E., Posner, E.S., Wojeicchowski, J.P.,Demiate, I. M., 2026. Effects of optimized wheat conditioning on extraction efficiency and milling performance under industrial conditions. Journal of Food Science and Technology, August.
