= George A. Milliken =

George Albert Milliken is emeritus professor of statistics at Kansas State University. He is a Fellow of the American Statistical Association and has published many papers in various statistical journals. Milliken is a co-author of the three volume Analysis of Messy Data series (Volume 1: Designed Experiments; Volume 2: Nonreplicated Experiments; Volume 3: Analysis of Covariance) and the co-author of the book SAS System for Mixed Models.

Milliken's books are widely referenced in the statistical research community. He has placed a significant emphasis of his professional research on the following areas:

- Nonlinear mixed models
- Linear and nonlinear models
- Design of experiments, appropriate experimental units
- Mixed models, repeated measures, non-replicated experiments
- Complex designs from designed experiments and observational studies
