= Helen B. Thompson =

American professor (1875–1969)

Prof. Helen B. Thompson
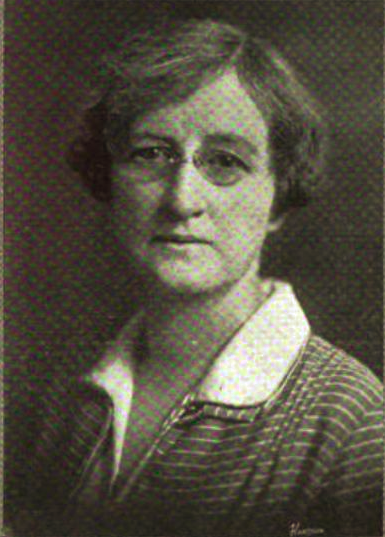
- Portrait from Western Hospital Review (1928)
- Born: 1875; Chillicothe, Ohio, U.S.
- Died: February 24, 1969 (aged 93–94); Palo Alto, California, U.S.
- Education: Yale University
- Scientific career
- Fields: Home economics
- Workplaces: Lincoln College; Rhode Island College; New Hampshire University; Connecticut College for Women; University of California, Los Angeles
- Thesis: (1917)
- Doctoral advisor: Lafayette Mendel

Helen B. Thompson (1875–1969) was an American home economist, Professor of Home Economics, and professor emeritus at University of California, Los Angeles (UCLA).

== Early life and education ==
Helen B. Thompson was born in Chillicothe, Ohio, 1875.

Her early studies were at the Kansas State Agricultural College (B.S., 1903; M.S., 1907). At Columbia University, she received the degree of Master of Arts (1913). At Yale University, she earned her Ph.D. under Lafayette Mendel in the Department of Physiology, with a major in Physiological chemistry (1917).

== Career and research ==
She was a professor of Home Economics at Lincoln College, Illinois; Rhode Island College; New Hampshire University; and Professor of Nutrition and Dietetics, Connecticut College for Women. In 1908, Thompson returned to Kansas as dean of the Division of Home Economics and Professor of Nutrition and Dietetics at the Kansas State Agricultural College, remaining there until assuming the position of Professor of Home Economics at UCLA, Los Angeles, California.

During the year 1922–23, she was a member of the fact-finding committee appointed by the U. S. Bureau of Education to investigate the facilities for higher education in the Massachusetts, her work being investigation of the opportunities for the education of women. She was also a member of the committee called to Washington by Secretary Henry A. Wallace to help in organizing the Bureau of Home Economics of the Department of Agriculture, 1923.

Thompson traveled extensively, lecturing on food and nutrition, and occasionally on household administration. Her research was in problems of growth and nutrition in childhood, and in studies of growth in mice on normal and restricted diet. Her later research focused on food investigations and educational studies.

== Death and legacy ==
Helen B. Thompson died at Palo Alto, California, February 24, 1969.

Thompson Hall, a building on the campus of the Kansas State Agricultural College, was so named in recognition of the work done by Thompson while dean, and of the fact that she was one of their distinguished women graduates.
