= Biological Conservation (journal) =

Peer-reviewed journal

- Discipline: Conservation biology
- Language: English
- Edited by: Vincent Devictor

Publication details
- History: 1968–present
- Publisher: Elsevier
- Frequency: Monthly
- Impact factor: 7.497 (2021)

Standard abbreviations
- ISO 4: Biol. Conserv.

Indexing
- CODEN: BICOBK
- ISSN: 0006-3207
- LCCN: 79001619
- OCLC no.: 38840579

Links
- Journal homepage

Biological Conservation is a peer-reviewed journal of conservation biology. The journal was established in 1968, and is published monthly by Elsevier. The current Editor-in-Chief is Vincent Devictor (Institute of Evolutionary Science of Montpellier).

== Abstracting and indexing ==
The journal is abstracted and indexed in the following databases:

- AGRICOLA
- Biological and Agricultural Index
- Cambridge Scientific Abstracts
- Current Advances in Ecological Sciences
- Current Contents/Agriculture, Biology & Environmental Sciences
- Elsevier Biobase
- Embase
- Energy Information Abstracts
- Environmental Periodicals Bibliography
- GEOBASE
- Science Citation Index
- Scopus
