= Luis Montaner =

Luis J. Montaner is an American researcher and executive vice president at The Wistar Institute in Philadelphia, where he leads the Institute’s HIV Cure and Viral Diseases Center as its founding director. Since 2016, Montaner has also served as the principal investigator of the NIH-funded BEAT-HIV Martin Delaney Research Collaboratory, a research consortium that aims to find a cure for HIV through a combination of strategies targeting the viral reservoir.

Originally from Puerto Rico, Montaner attended Kansas State University, where he received a Doctor of Veterinary Medicine in 1989. Montaner was admitted to the 1991 class of Marshall Scholars, and in 1995, he obtained his D.Phil. in Experimental Pathology from The University of Oxford. After completing his graduate studies, Montaner joined the faculty of The Wistar Institute as an assistant professor. In 2015, he was named the Herbert Kean, M.D., Family Professor.

Research

Montaner’s research career in infectious disease has primarily focused on the HIV-1 virus and potential cure strategies. A 2002 paper from the Montaner Lab in The Journal of Immunology was the first to identify that people living with HIV had marked decreases in dendritic cells, leading to more investigation in their role in HIV. In 2012, his laboratory reported that the AIDS virus could be suppressed by boosting the immune system, thereby reducing patients' reliance on existing antiviral drugs. The AIDS service organization Philadelphia FIGHT partnered with Montaner’s lab at The Wistar Institute in 2014 on a clinical trial to use interferon to strengthen the immune system in patients infected with HIV-1.

Montaner’s HIV research has emphasized the importance of community input to research projects by working closely with research participants and stakeholders within the community of people living with HIV. The BEAT-HIV Collaboratory has received coverage for its efforts to increase community involvement through its community engagement group model.
