= Harriet Waddy =

American military officer

Harriet M. Waddy
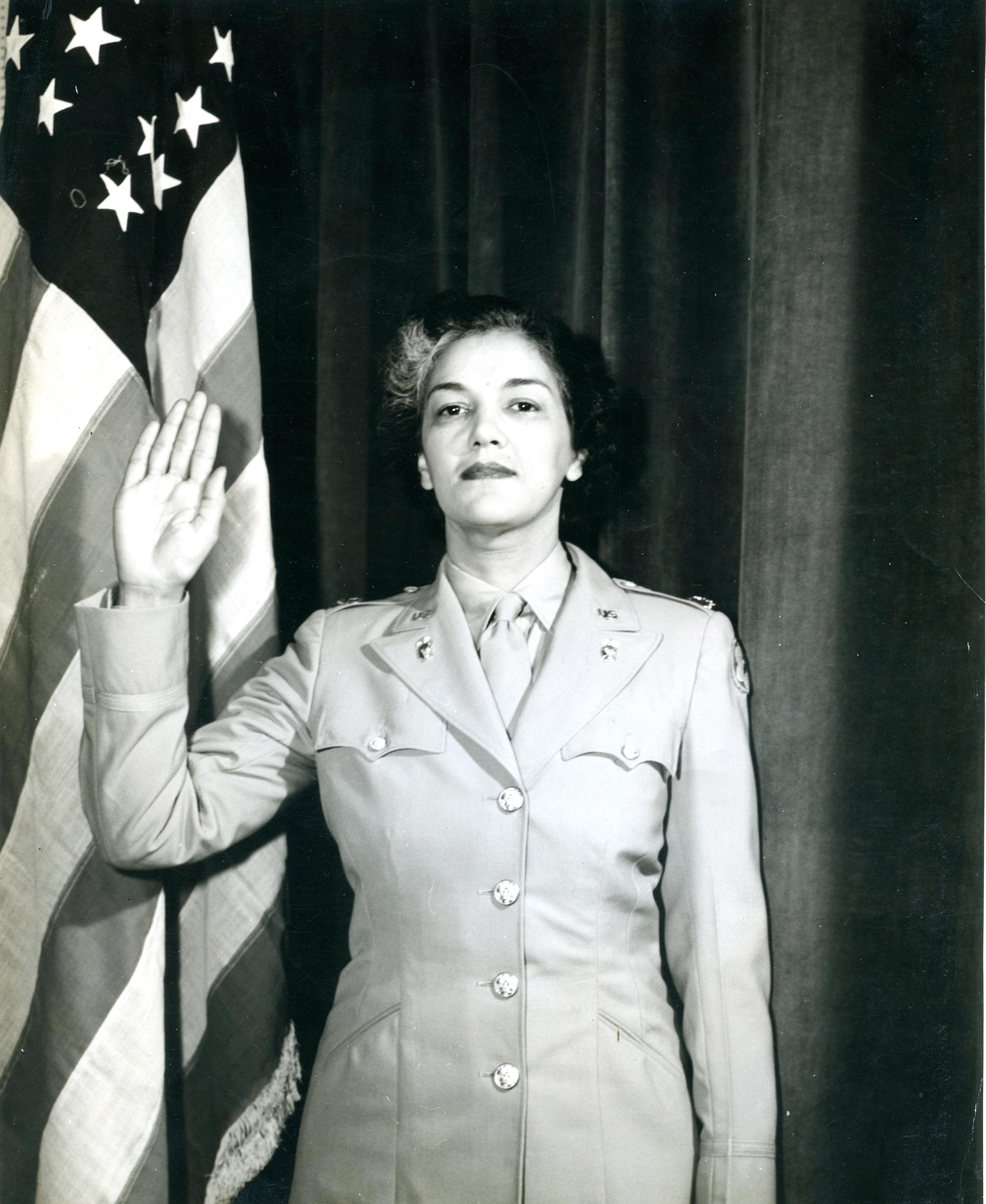
- Born: Harriet M. Hardin; June 20, 1904; Jefferson City, Missouri
- Died: February 21, 1999 (aged 94); Las Vegas, Nevada
- Education: Kansas State University
- Military career
- Branch: United States Army, Women's Army Corps
- Service years: 1942–1952
- Rank: Major
- Conflicts: World War II

Lieutenant Colonel Harriet M. Waddy (also known as Harriet West; 1904 – 1999) was an American military officer. She graduated from Kansas State University and worked as an aide for Mary McLeod Bethune. During World War II, she attained the rank of major in the Women's Army Corps. She was one of the highest-ranking African American officers during the war and served as a wartime adviser on racial issues.

== Early life and education ==
Harriet M. Hardin was born on June 20, 1904, in Jefferson City, Missouri. Following the death of her mother, she was raised by her maternal grandmother. She earned a degree from the College of Agriculture and Applied Science at Kansas State University. During the Great Depression, she worked as an aide for Mary McLeod Bethune when Bethune was director of the Division of Negro Affairs.

== World War II ==
In 1942 Waddy joined the newly formed Women's Army Auxiliary Corps officer candidate school at Fort Des Moines. She became an aide to WAC director Oveta Culp Hobby and an adviser on racial issues.

Waddy was dispatched to the South where she listened to grievances from Black women in the Women's Army Corps. During a visit to the Fort Des Moines training base, she made a recommendation that official memoranda posted on information boards eliminate "all reference to white and colored personnel", saying that it would bring "less embarrassment to the colored personnel" and a "feeling that a forward step has been made toward democracy." During an April 1943 radio broadcast for the Army, Waddy encouraged Black women to join the military. Her broadcast acknowledged that the segregated status of the armed forces did "not represent an ideal of democracy", but said that joining the military was not "a retreat from our fight," but "our contribution to its realization."

During the war Waddy and Charity Adams were the only Black women with the rank of major in the Women's Army Corps. Adams later recalled that Waddy was both charming and well-disciplined. In 1948, she was promoted to lieutenant colonel. Waddy retired from the military in 1952.

== Later and personal life ==
Following her military career Waddy was hired by the Federal Aviation Administration. In Oregon, she worked at a Job Corps center as a counselor for troubled girls.

Waddy lived in Eugene, Oregon, and married four times. During the war, she was married to physician Charles West. In 1998, following the end of her fourth marriage to Major Edward Waddy, she moved to Las Vegas. She died there on February 21, 1999. She enjoyed bowling and Frank Sinatra's "My Way". The United States Army Women's Museum in Fort Lee, Virginia, holds a collection of memorabilia related to Waddy.
