= Bigfoot in popular culture =

Cultural references to Bigfoot/Sasquatch

Bigfoot is an alleged human or ape-like cryptid in North America. Since the mid-20th century, Bigfoot has become increasingly relevant in popular culture and is the subject of film, television, advertising, music, literature and more.

== Advertising ==
"Bigfoot" and "Sasquatch" are pop culture terms that have been used in advertising across many different products and services

- Jack Link's brand of beef jerky uses Bigfoot as a product mascot. The company also produces a series of commercials entitled "Messin' with Sasquatch". In the commercials, hikers play tricks on Bigfoot. The end of the commercials typically show the creature reacting angrily to the pranks, chasing, and sometimes attacking them.
- Game camera manufacturer the Bushnell Corporation, along with Field & Stream, launched a promotional contest over a photo taken in September 2007, by deer hunter Rick Jacobs of Pennsylvania on his game camera of what some believe could be a young Bigfoot. More skeptical viewers deemed it a bear. The companies offered a one million dollar reward for a verifiable photo of Bigfoot taken on a game camera.
- The food chain Red Robin ran a television commercial in which a hiker speaks the words "Red Robin" and hears a reply of "Yummm" from Bigfoot.
- The restaurant chain Boston Pizza used "Louie" the Bigfoot in a series of television commercials around 2007. Ultimately they decided to drop the character as a promotional gimmick.
- Kokanee Beer used a Bigfoot named "Mel" in a series of commercials pitting him against the "Kokanee Ranger" played by John Novak. In 2004, a Mel statue was built in Creston, British Columbia. The Columbia Brewery Company paid for half the construction costs.
- Carlsberg Beer used Bigfoot in two commercials.
- American comfort technology company Purple launched an internet ad on YouTube in November 2016 entitled, "Can Your Mattress Protector Stand up to Sasquatch?". It depicts a Bigfoot mother advertising the brand in a comedic style along with her husband and son. As of January 2022, this advertisement has over 128 million views.
- American Insurance company Progressive launched a commercial in March 2020 depicting fictional saleswoman Flo having a conversation with a Bigfoot named "Darryl" who is upset that people are so preoccupied with their outdoor recreational vehicles that no one wants to find him anymore.
- American personal care products company Dr. Squatch parodies the name "Sasquatch" in their brand and the creature is depicted in their logo.
- Sierra Nevada Brewing Company brews a barley wine-style ale called "Bigfoot".
- The U.S. Forest Service uses Bigfoot in comedic environmental protection campaigns.
- In the spring of 2020, fire safety officials in Oregon began a forest fire safety campaign called "Safer with Sasquatch".
- Among the various characters associated with Chuck E. Cheese's is a Bigfoot named Nigel.
- During the COVID-19 pandemic, Bigfoot was used as a symbol for numerous private and public social distancing campaigns.
- Veganuary launched an advertisement in December 2021 in which a Bigfoot, voiced by James Cromwell, plans to switch to a vegan diet in order to help prevent climate change.
- In a 2024 Booking.com Super Bowl LVIII commercial, Tina Fey appears as Bigfoot being groomed by Jack McBrayer.

== Films ==
Bigfoot is a popular film subject that has appeared in numerous genres including horror films, comedy films, animated films, documentary films and more.

=== Bigfoot as a primary subject ===
- Bigfoot (1970)
- The Geek (1971)
- The Legend of Boggy Creek (1972)
- Bigfoot Man or Beast (1972)
- Shriek of the Mutilated (1974)
- Sasqua (1975)
- The Mysterious Monsters (1976)
- Creature from Black Lake (1976)
- Snowbeast (1976)
- Sasquatch, the Legend of Bigfoot (1976)
- Manbeast, Myth Or Monster? (1978)
- Curse of Bigfoot (1978)
- The Capture of Bigfoot (1979)
- Revenge of Bigfoot (1979)
- Night of the Demon (1980)
- Boggy Creek II: And the Legend Continues (1985)
- Bigfoot (1987)
- Cry Wilderness (1987)
- Harry and the Hendersons (1987)
- Jacaranda Joe (1994)
- Drawing Flies (1996)
- Little Bigfoot (1997)
- Little Bigfoot 2: The Journey Home (1997)
- Sasquatch Hunters (1997),
- Ape Canyon (2002)Whatcom County
- The Untold (2002)
- Bigfootville (2002)
- They Call Him Sasquatch (2003)
- Sasquatch Hunters (2005)
- The Unknown (2005)
- Bigfoot (2006)
- Abominable (2006)
- Bigfoot (2006)
- Sasquatch Mountain (2006)
- The Legend of Sasquatch (2006)
- The Sasquatch Gang (2007)
- Not Your Typical Bigfoot Movie (2008)
- Bigfoot (2009)
- The Wild Man of the Navidad (2009)
- Boggy Creek (2009)
- Momo (2009)
- Letters from the Big Man (2011)
- The Erickson Project (2011)
- Bigfoot: The Lost Coast Tapes (2012)
- Bigfoot (2012)
- Willow Creek (2013)
- Feed the Gods (2014)
- Stomping Ground (2014)
- Hunting the Legend (2014)
- Exists (2014)
- The Legend of Grassman (2014)
- Bigfoot vs. D.B. Cooper (2014)
- Something in the Woods (2015)
- Valley of the Sasquatch (2015)
- Bigfoot vs. Zombies (2015)
- Bigfoot: The Movie (2015)
- Sassquatch: Return of the Queen (2015)
- The Sighting (2016)
- Gimme Head: the Tale of the Cuyahoga Valley Bigfoot (2016)
- The Bigfoot Project (2017)
- The Son of Bigfoot (2017)
- Big Legend (2018)
- The Man Who Killed Hitler and then The Bigfoot (2018)
- Missing Link (2019)
- Big Fur (2019)
- Bigfoot Family (2020)
- Bigfoot vs. the Illuminati (2020)
- Sasquatch (2021)
- Bigfoot vs Megalodon (2021)
- Sasquatch Sunset (2024)

=== Appearance or reference ===
- Close Encounters of the Third Kind (1977) – a character references a Bigfoot sighting.
- A Goofy Movie (1995) – Bigfoot (vocal effects provided by Frank Welker) interacts with Goofy and Max Goof while they are camping.
- Behind the Camera: The Unauthorized Story of Charlie's Angels (2004) features a sequence recreating the filming of one of the episodes of The Six Million Dollar Man featuring Bigfoot; John DeSantis portrays the unidentified actor playing Bigfoot (in real life either Andre the Giant or Ted Cassidy).
- Tenacious D in The Pick of Destiny (2006) – John C. Reilly portrays Sasquatch in a Tenacious D music video.
- TMNT (2007) – Appears as an other-dimensional antagonist whom the Teenage Mutant Ninja Turtles fight.
- The Dark Knight (2008) – Bigfoot, specifically a still from the famous Patterson–Gimlin film, is shown on a board at the Gotham City Police Department where the identity of the Joker is being investigated.
- Strange Wilderness (2008)
- Bedtime Stories (2008)
- Hotel Transylvania (2012) – In this franchise, Bigfoot is pictured as being a large size. His head is the only thing that is not shown.
- The Cabin in the Woods (2012)
- Cloudy with a Chance of Meatballs 2 (2013) – Depicted as a Foodimal called the "Sasquash" which is a humanoid squash that hides in the background.
- Hotel Transylvania 2 (2015) – Same description as the previous movie.
- Hotel Transylvania 3: Summer Vacation (2018) – Same description as the previous movie. By the end of the film, his head is finally shown.
- Missing 411: The Hunted (2019)

== Games ==
=== Toys and board games ===
- The Milton Bradley Company released a board game in 1977 entitled Big Foot The Giant Snow Monster.
- Fisher-Price released an "Imaginext" remote controlled robot called BIG FOOT The Monster in 2010.
- Archie McPhee produces a Bigfoot action figure as well as other novelty Bigfoot-related items including car air fresheners, a lunchbox, and ornaments.
- The Ravensburger game company made a strategy board game call HORRIFIED: American Monsters, in which the Bigfoot prominently features.
- Bigfoot is a prominent Beastie character in MetaZoo, a cryptozoology-themed collectible card game released in 2020.
- In 2022, Nerf announced their new mascot, Murph, a dart-covered Bigfoot.

=== Video games ===
- In the Darkstalkers series, Sasquatch is a playable character.
- In the 1991 The Simpsons arcade game, Bigfoot is depicted as an opponent.
- In the 1993 game Sam & Max Hit the Road, the eponymous characters embark on a search for a Bigfoot that escaped from a traveling freak show. Later an entire population of bigfoots is encountered.
- In the 2000 game Banjo-Tooie, the player encounters a Bigfoot/Yeti-like creature called "Biggafoot" in Hailfire Peaks.
- In the 2000 game Ski Resort Tycoon, Bigfoot is an obstacle that players must overcome when building their resort.
- In the 2001 game Zoo Tycoon, players can unlock Bigfoot and the Yeti for display at their zoo.
- In the 2003 game Banjo-Kazooie: Grunty's Revenge, the player encounters a creature in the swamp level "Bad Magic Bayou" called a "Bogfoot".
- In the 2004 game Tony Hawk's Underground 2, when unlocked, Bigfoot is a playable character.
- In the 2004 game Grand Theft Auto: San Andreas, a rumor surfaced regarding players allegedly catching a glimpse of Bigfoot within the game's forests. It soon became a popular topic on sites such as YouTube, and much like its real-life counterpart, players searching for Bigfoot within the game became a commonplace. Rockstar Games has denied the existence of Bigfoot within the game. Modders have since added their own versions of the creature to the game.
- In the 2007 game The Sims 2: Bon Voyage, a Bigfoot sim can be found on a secret vacation lot and brought home to live with the player's sim.
- In the 2007 game Poptropica, on Cryptids Island, Bigfoot is the last cryptid that the player must find. He is proven to be real, and is found in the Pacific Northwest.
- In the 2007 game Tiger Woods PGA Tour 2007, Bigfoot is seen hiding behind a tree and an easter egg.
- In the 2010 game Red Dead Redemption: Undead Nightmare, a side-mission entitled "Birth of the Conservation Movement", has the main protagonist, John Marston, interact with the last living Sasquatch.
- In the 2012 game Assassin's Creed III, the young assassin Connor is told stories of a tall, hairy figure who steals from hunter's traps. This starts a side quest, where the player is tasked with finding out the truth about this story.
- In the 2013 game Grand Theft Auto V, Bigfoot is seen in the game's "Predator" mission. After completion of the story mode, players who attain the 100% Completion goal can undertake a mission to hunt Bigfoot, although it turns out to be a man in a suit. Additionally, players can find and consume peyote plants, one of which temporarily transforms the player into a Bigfoot. For Halloween 2022, players who completed certain tasks in the Grand Theft Auto Online version of the game received a Bigfoot costume for their wardrobe.
- In the 2020 game Terrordrome: Reign of the Legends, Sasquatch appears as one of the playable characters.
- In the 2022 game Splatoon 3, Bigfoot was featured as the third option in the April 2023 Cryptid Splatfest Nessie vs. Aliens vs. Bigfoot.
- In the ukrainian asymmetric survival horror game BIGFOOT. Game is focused on finding and hunting bigfoot (playing as one of 4 different hunters) or catching those hunters (playing as bigfoot himself). Bigfoot can be controlled by player or AI, while hunters can be controlled only by players. Action of the game takes place in various national parks in the North America.

== Internet ==
- Starting in 2025 with the release of Unicode v17.0, U+1FAC8 🫈 HAIRY CREATURE is an emoji often depicted as Bigfoot by vendors. Notably, Google (via their Noto Color Emoji font), depicting the emoji in the same pose as the one in the Patterson–Gimlin film.

== Law ==
- Skamania County, Washington passed a law regarding Bigfoot in 1969 declaring that "any willful, wanton slaying of such creatures shall be deemed a felony" subject to substantial fine and/or imprisonment. The fact that this legislation was passed on April 1 did not escape notice, but County Commissioner Conrad Lundy said that "this is not an April Fool's Day joke ... there is reason to believe such an animal exists." The ordinance was amended in 1984 to preclude an insanity defense and to consider such a killing homicide if the creature was proven by a coroner to be humanoid. The Skamania County ordinance speculates on whether or not Bigfoot is a subspecies of Homo sapiens.
- Whatcom County, Washington passed a bill on June 9, 1991, which declared Whatcom County a "Sasquatch Protection and Refuge Area".

== Literature ==
Like film and television, Bigfoot is a common subject of literature appearing in a variety of genres.

- The Long Earth is a novel by Terry Pratchett and Stephen Baxter whose main antagonists are a dimension jumping archaic humanoid species similar to man which are referred to as trolls.
- Sasquatch Books is the largest publishing house in the Pacific Northwest. Its logo features a Sasquatch footprint.
- The Gwaii, published by Arcana Studio, is a children's graphic novel that features a Sasquatch named "Tanu" searching for his mother and tribe in the Canadian wilderness.
- John Prufrock, the hero of the comic book Proof, is a Bigfoot who works for a secret agency that hunts and captures other cryptids. The comic was written by Alex Grecian and illustrated by Riley Rossmo. It was published in Image Comics from October 2007 to May 2011.
- Donations to Clarity, a 2011 novel by Noah Baird, tells the story of a Bigfoot who falls in love with a Bigfoot hoaxer.
- A character called "The Sasquatch" appears in the Italian comic series Tex (as a huge wild man with thaumaturgical powers) and Martin Mystère.
- In the Chip 'n Dale Rescue Rangers comic story arc, "Coast to Coast" part 4: "Bobo Wiggle's Circus Surprise!", the Rescue Rangers encounter the legendary Bigfoot was trapped by Bob Wilkins in the circus, but the Rangers get to free and find the other Bigfoot.
- In the non-canon Star Wars Tales comic "Into the Great Unknown", the Millennium Falcon, after a blind hyperspace jump, crash-lands on what appears to be Endor but is in fact the Pacific Northwest around the time of Lewis and Clark, resulting in Han Solo's death at the hands of the natives and the eventual discovery of his body by Indiana Jones (who is disturbed by something "eerily familiar" about the remains) – "Sasquatch" is actually Chewbacca.
- One of the main characters from the Canadian Marvel Comics superhero team Alpha Flight is called Sasquatch.
- Alternate history author Harry Turtledove has written stories as part of the "State of Jefferson Stories" titled "Visitor from the East" (May 2016), "Peace is Better" (May 2016), "Typecasting" (June 2016) and "Three Men and a Sasquatch" (2019) published online here where Sasquatches, Yetis and other related cryptids are real. However, unlike common popular depictions of such creatures as less evolved primates, they are essentially another race of human beings, and have been integrated into society.
- In the poem Satch by Jeannette Allée (Fence literary magazine, Vol. 8,1&2, Summer 2005), Bigfoot is a metaphor for how individuals childishly hide from their own talents, desires, love.
- In the SCP Foundation mythos, the Bigfoot are depicted as Homo nocturnalis, an endangered species of the genus Homo classified as SCP-1000. A cover story initially introduces SCP-1000 as possessing a fictitious genetic disease that increases the likelihood of spontaneous brain death in other hominids the longer they are viewed at. In actuality, SCP-1000 was once the dominant species of Earth until prehistoric humans stole and used their own technology against them, drove them to near extinction, and wiped their civilization from history. The survivors and their descendants have been given the moniker of the "Children of the Night" by a group of human oral historians known as the "Children of the Sun."
- Author Max Brooks released a novel on June 16, 2020, entitled Devolution: A Firsthand Account of the Rainier Sasquatch Massacre, about a fictional Bigfoot attack at Mount Rainier.
- In the My Little Pony IDW comic series, Micro-Series Issue 6, Applejack and her family pursue the mythical and mysterious "Sass Squash" during the Hearth's Warming Eve season.
- The 2024 book The Secret History of Bigfoot: Field Notes on a North American Monster by John O'Connor explores the cultural obsession with Bigfoot.

== Miscellaneous ==
- Bigfoot is a popular Halloween costume.
- The 2021 Ford Bronco features a "Sasquatch" package.
- In 2027, the U.S. Postal Service is set to release a series of "Mythical Creatures" postage stamps, featuring Bigfoot along with other American cryptids.

== Music ==
- Country musician Don Jones released an album in the 1970s called Bigfoot (Northwest’s Abominable Snowman), which included the song "Bigfoot" (also released as a single), which featured supposedly genuine Bigfoot screams recorded by Ray Wallace, the man who claimed responsibility for finding Bigfoot evidence.
- "The Bigfoot Song: I Still Believe in Bigfoot", by singer/songwriter Danny Freyer, has become somewhat of an anthem for Bigfoot enthusiasts since it was first released in 2005, and is used in the closing credits of the short documentary film American Bigfoot (2017), which is directed by American comedian Bobcat Goldthwait. The song's lyrics include, "I still believe in Bigfoot/Don't care what they say/Still believe in apple pie and the good ol' U.S.A," and were written in response to a news article following the death of Ray Wallace. The article quoted Wallace's son stating that his father had perpetrated a hoax, carving the footprints himself. The song highlights the desire of many Bigfoot enthusiasts to believe in Bigfoot, regardless of scientific evidence or lack thereof.
- The song "Bigfoot!" by the Winnipeg indie-rock band The Weakerthans is about the frustration and humiliation of a man who is purported to have seen a Bigfoot.
- The pop punk band Groovie Ghoulies released a song in 1997 about Bigfoot called "Running with Bigfoot".
- American chiptune-based synthpunk band, Math the Band released a song as part of their Don't Worry album in 2009 titled "Bigfoot".
- The musician Saxsquatch has had a number of viral videos where he, dressed in a Sasquatch costume, performs saxophone covers of popular music. Saxsquatch has gathered a large social media following.

== Podcasts ==
- The Adventure Zone, a popular real-play RPG podcast, features Bigfoot as a side character in its Amnesty campaign, set in West Virginia.
- Bigfoot and Beyond, a podcast hosted by Finding Bigfoot cast members James "BoBo" Fay, and Cliff Barackman.
- Wild Thing
- Bigfoot has been a topic of discussion the Joe Rogan Experience; guests that discussed the topic with Rogan include Bobcat Goldthwait, Les Stroud, Rutledge Wood, Tony Hinchcliffe, and Steven Tyler.

== Sports ==
- Bigfoot is the name of the first series of monster trucks. In 1975, Bob Chandler created the original truck, which he named after his driving style rather than its characteristically large tires.
- Squatch was the mascot of the Seattle SuperSonics, who were a professional basketball franchise that was based in Seattle, Washington and played in the NBA from 1967 until 2008.
- Quatchi, one of three mascots for the 2010 Winter Olympics in Vancouver, is portrayed as a "young sasquatch who comes from the mysterious forests of Canada".
- Bigfoot is the name of the athletics teams of the Community Colleges of Spokane, with the mascot being named “Skitch the Sasquatch”.

== Television ==
Bigfoot has been featured in a wide variety of television and has been the focus point such as in documentaries and programs depicting the search for the creature, or referenced in many other ways within shows of varying genres and types.

- Alcoa Presents: One Step Beyond in October 1959 presented one of the earliest television series episodes referencing a Bigfoot-like creature that rescues a little boy, Davey Morris, who is lost in the woods. Davey insists that a giant, furry friend helped him and visits him at home where the creature leaves giant footprints and an unpleasant, lingering odor. Davey's father and friends hunt the creature and set the woods on fire to flush it out but with no success. One horrified hunter does glimpse the creature but can't come to terms with what he has seen.
- Finding Bigfoot on Animal Planet follows a team of Bigfoot Field Researchers Organization (BFRO) members searching for the creature.
- Destination Truth on Syfy features multiple episodes of host Josh Gates searching for Bigfoot or related creatures such as the Yeti.
- Survivorman season 6 depicted Les Stroud searching for the creature while surviving in the wilderness alone. It was titled – Survivorman Bigfoot.
- Unsolved Mysteries seasons one and six featured episodes regarding eyewitness accounts of Bigfoot encounters.
- The Animal X series on the Discovery Channel featured an episode related to Bigfoot in which a research team discovered the Skookum cast in the year 2000. The 2004 spin-off "Animal X – Natural Mystery Unit" showcased an episode in where a team searched for Bigfoot in Texas.
- Ancient Aliens on History aired an episode on May 23, 2012, entitled "Aliens and Bigfoot", which explored theories between extraterrestrials and Bigfoot.
- The Six Million Dollar Man and its spin-off, The Bionic Woman featured three separate stories (two of them two-part episodes) featuring a bionic Bigfoot which was created by aliens (and the source of the legend owing to the aliens' extended time taking refuge in the wilderness of northern California); initially an antagonist, Bigfoot eventually becomes a friend and ally to the heroes. In the first two-part episode, the creature was played by professional wrestler André the Giant while in the latter episodes he was played by Ted Cassidy.
- The Beachcombers episode "The Sasquatch Walks By Night", aired January 13, 1974 and depicts a storyline involving a hoaxed Bigfoot sighting.
- Bigfoot and Wildboy, which started as a segment of the second season of the Krofft Supershow before spinning off into a series, has the title character joined by a young orphan.
- Harry and the Hendersons was a 72 episode show that ran from 1991 to 1993 and was based on the film of the same name.
- Trailer Park Boys depicts one of the characters frequently mispronounces Sasquatch as a "Samsquanch".
- Sasquatch was also featured in the Tenacious D (The Greatest Band in the World) TV show and wanted to join the band but was unable to. Sasquatch did, however, cause Jack Black and Kyle Gass regained their trust in the rock star mythos.
- Bigfoot makes an appearance in a Futurama episode entitled "Spanish Fry", where Philip J. Fry attempts to find Bigfoot.
- A female Bigfoot appears near in the end of The All New Popeye Hour episode "Popeye and Bigfoot" and carries Bluto.
- In the TV series The Invisible Man, the title character of Darien Fawkes is turned invisible by a chemical derived from Bigfoot; Bigfoot has escaped detection over the centuries by turning invisible.
- In The Simpsons episode "The Call of the Simpsons", Homer Simpson gets covered in mud and is mistaken for Bigfoot.
- In DuckTales episode "The Other Bin of Scrooge McDuck!", Bigfoot (voiced by Sam Riegel) was found with a thorn in his paw by Huey, who removed the thorn, hoarded him in McDuck Manor, and named him Tenderfeet.
- In Tom and Jerry Tales episode "Sasquashed", while on a camping trip, Tom, Jerry and Tuffy find a Bigfoot named Sheldon.
- In Phineas and Ferb episode "Get That Bigfoot Outta My Face!", Candace was eaten by a Bigfoot, mistaking with real, however, it turns out that was a Bigfoot costume instead of real.
- In The Newsroom episode "I'll Fix You", news researchers discuss and (often jokingly) debate the reality of Bigfoot as a future story for the news.
- The iCarly episode "iBelieve in Bigfoot" focuses on the main characters visiting a forest in search of Bigfoot.
- In The California Raisin Show, the Raisins, sick and tired of autograph hounds and obsessive fans, elect to go camping in the deep woods for a much needed vacation. One of the Raisins tells of a Native American (portrayed as potatoes) legend of a monster called "Sasquash". In the fruit & vegetable manner of the show, the Raisins come across a race of gigantic anthropomorphic squash and appease them by performing an impromptu concert, then return to civilization leaving a boombox of their music and an autograph for the Bigfoot-type creatures.
- Bigfoot makes an appearance in the "Summer Camp!" episode of the family comedy series The Aquabats! Super Show!, turning out to be the boyfriend of a female shapeshifting "Were-Ape" which has been terrorizing a summer camp.
- In the Brickleberry episode "Steve's Bald", one of the park rangers, Steve, is mistaken for Bigfoot after overuse of a black-market baldness cure leaves his whole body covered in hair, playing along with the misconception until being accused of killing Steve – prompting a chase which leads to the discovery, and death, of the real Bigfoot.
- The Penn & Teller: Bullshit! episode "Cryptozoology" discusses Bigfoot and the Loch Ness Monster.
- The Spike reality show 10 Million Dollar Bigfoot Bounty has nine teams trying to find proof of Bigfoot's existence.
- In the Littlest Pet Shop episode "Littlest Bigfoot", Penny Ling encounters a juvenile bigfoot in a forested National Park. Her friends are skeptical of her findings, until they encounter the creature themselves later in the episode.
- In the Australian YouTube series The Big Lez Show, Sassy the Sasquatch is one of the main protagonists, accompanied by other Sasquatch like creatures. Sassy and his friends frequently engage in recreational drug use.
- In Gravity Falls, Bigfoot appears for a split second in the theme song and is parodied in the series.. At the Mystery Shack, Grunkle Stan has a statue in one of his exhibits called the "Sascrotch", which appears as Bigfoot wearing underwear.
- In Timon & Pumbaa episode “Bigfoot, Littlebrain”, Timon and Pumbaa meet Bigfoot (voiced by Bill Fagerbakke). When they accidentally eat Bigfoot's bug friends, Bigfoot makes them keep him company so that he won't be lonely.
- In Animal Mechanicals, Sasquatch is a blue Bigfoot with the ability to stretch his arms and/or legs to an incredible length.
- In How I Met Your Mother, Marshall Eriksen (played by Jason Segel) has often declared himself a 'believer' of Sasquatch, although being frequently mocked for this by his friends.
- Bigfoot is a recurring character in Back at the Barnyard.
- In the Goof Troop episode "Winter Blunderland", Pete convinces Goofy to play Bigfoot in order to bring business to his car lot. Instead of customers, the real female Bigfoot is attracted.
- In the SheZow episode "SheSquatch", SheZow and Maz help a female Sasquatch named SheSquatch from an evil park ranger from forcing her to scare campers.
- In the Round the Twist episode "The Nirandathal Beast", the title creature is based on Bigfoot. Bronson gets mistaken for the beast after growing a long beard due to using the family razor before Pete and gets the attention of the authorities and eventually bounty hunters.
- In the Cartoon Network series We Bare Bears, the character Charlie is an anthropomorphic Bigfoot.
- In The A-Team episode "Timber", Murdock (played by actor Dwight Schultz) searches for Bigfoot.
- A childlike version of Bigfoot is a recurring character in Wabbit, voiced by Matthew Mercer.
- In Mr. Pickles, a mafia hit-man is turned into Bigfoot.
- "Bigfoot: The Convincing Evidence", released on April 14, 2017, is episode 2 of season 2 of BuzzFeed web series, BuzzFeed Unsolved: Supernatural in which evidence suggesting the existence of Bigfoot is discussed and investigated.
- In the Courage the Cowardly Dog episode "Courage Meets Bigfoot" the titular character befriends a Bigfoot and protects him from a mob.
- In the Dexter's Laboratory episode "Sassy Come Home", Dee Dee befriends a Bigfoot due to their mutual huge feet and they have to contend with Dexter, who is determined to capture the sasquatch.
- In The Powerpuff Girls episode "Say Uncle", The girls take a Bigfoot-like Beastman (vocal effects provided by Dee Bradley Baker) home by mistake thinking he is their uncle Eugene, but problems ensue when they take the Beastman to Townsville.
- In the Blaze and the Monster Machines episode "Gasquatch!", the guest character is a large, fur-covered Bigfoot-like monster truck who lives in the forest and loves mud.
- In the CatDog episodes, "The Great Parent Mystery" and "Vexed of Kin", the titular characters' adopted mother is a blue-furred sasquatch married to a big-nosed frog.
- In the Hi Hi Puffy AmiYumi episode "Camping Caper", Ami gets kidnapped by a giant Bigfoot, Yumi attempts to rescue Ami before being eaten by the Bigfoot.
- In the MacGyver episode "Ghost Ship", MacGyver encounters BigFoot on an abandoned boat in an Alaskan bay.
- The 2010 Super Sentai series, Tensou Sentai Goseiger featured the antagonistic cryptid-themed monster group Yuumajuu. Their second-in-command, Kinggon, is a bigfoot with secondary theme of tarantula.
- In the second season of The World According to Jeff Goldblum, the 2021 episode entitled "Monsters" has Jeff Goldblum joining Bigfoot hunters at Mount Shasta.
- In The Pentaverate, Sasquatch is depicted as the "guard dog" of The Pentaverate secret society. In episode four, Shrek knocks Sasquatch unconscious.
- In the fifth series of the British version of The Masked Singer reality game show, runner-up Alex Brooker wore a Bigfoot costume.
- In the Fugget About It episode "Sasquatchewan", Jimmy and Petey go on a hunting trip and come home with a Sasquatch.
- In the Smiling Friends episode "A Allan Adventure", a Bigfoot steals an assortment of paperclips from the character Allan following a helicopter crash, and is subsequently beheaded when they are again stolen by a group of skeletal pirates.
- In the television series Sanctuary, a sentient, talking Bigfoot is one of the principal characters, portrayed by Christopher Heyerdahl.
- In the television series Tulsa King, professional wrestler Mike "Cash Flo" Walden portrays a character named "Bigfoot", bodyguard to Dwight Manfredi, played by Sylvester Stallone.

== Theatre ==
Sasquatched! The Musical is a musical play written and composed by Minnesota native Phil Darg in 2012. It follows the story of a gentle, dignified talking Sasquatch named Arthur, his interactions with the human characters of the surrounding Pacific Northwest area, and the issues revolving around Sasquatch-human relations. The style of the play is humorous, fast-moving, and family-friendly. The play was submitted as an entry to the New York Musical Theatre Festival in September 2012. In February, it was chosen as one of NYMF's Next Link selections and later received an award from the Anna Sosenko Assist Trust. In July 2013, the show was performed as part of NYMF at the Pearl Theatre in New York City.

In 2026, Bigfoot! The Musical premiered off-Broadway at the New York City Center. The production was first conceived by Amber Ruffin, Kevin Sciretta, and David Schmoll in 2015, first premiered as a one-act musical in 2018 at the Majestic Repertory Theatre in Las Vegas, and was staged as a concert at 54 Below in New York City in 2024.

== Tourism ==
There are annual Bigfoot-related conventions and festivals, and the creature notably plays a role in Pacific Northwest tourism, such as the annual "Sasquatch Daze" held for several years in Harrison Hot Springs, British Columbia and the Oregon "Bigfoot Festival" held in Troutdale, Oregon which draws thousands in attendance from all over. The small town of Remer, Minnesota holds an annual festival called "Bigfoot Days".

Primatologist and Bigfoot researcher John Napier commented on this, stating that "Bigfoot in some quarters of North America has become big business ... It can no longer be considered simply as a natural phenomenon that can be studied with the techniques of a naturalist; the entrepreneurs have moved in and folklore has become fakelore."

In March 2021, as a means to draw tourism, Oklahoma announced it will issue "Bigfoot Tracking Permits" to be sold at certain businesses and will offer a $2.1 million bounty for a Bigfoot captured alive, unharmed, and legally.

== See also ==
- Loch Ness Monster in popular culture
- Patterson–Gimlin film
- Sasquatch! Music Festival
- Hibagon – Japan's Bigfoot
- Kraken in popular culture
- Sasquatch Pushing Over a House (1982), Seattle, Washington
- Peter C. Byrne
