= Geek (disambiguation) =

A geek is a slang term for an odd person.

Geek or GEEK may also refer to:

== Arts, entertainment, and media ==
=== Films ===
- Geeks (2004 film), a 2004 film
- The Geek, a 1971 pornographic horror film

=== Music ===
- Geek!, the first EP by My Bloody Valentine
- Geeks (musical duo), a K-pop and Korean hiphop duo
- The Geeks (band), a South Korean punk band

== Other uses ==
- Geek, a human who bites the heads off of small animals as in a geek show
- Geek.com, a Weblog site

== See also ==
- Geake, a surname
- Geek Squad, the technical support subsidiary of Best Buy
- Nerd (disambiguation)
