= Sapling Pictures =

- Type: Privately held company
- Industry: Motion pictures television
- Founded: 1998; 28 years ago
- Founder: Keith Jodoin
- Headquarters: Fairfax, Virginia, United States,
- Website: www.saplingpictures.com

Sapling Pictures is an American television and digital media production company led by Keith Jodoin. In its 20-year history, the company has produced hundreds of hours of content for television, Hollywood film studios and top international brands including Discovery Channel, National Geographic Channel, Warner Brothers, 20th Century Fox, truTV, Animal Planet, TLC, Walt Disney Pictures and Science Channel.

== History ==
In 1998, Jodoin founded Sapling Pictures and began working exclusively with Discovery Channel and its sister companies. The company produced both weekly show promotions and behind-the-scenes content for DVD and Blu-ray releases of Deadliest Catch, MythBusters, Dirty Jobs, among others. The company won a Promax Award for its short film, 2nd Deadliest Job, a behind-the-scenes featurette on the crew filming the Deadliest Catch television series.

Sapling Pictures produced its first short film, Evenfall in 2003. Electronica band Hitchcock Blonde composed an original song, "Compromised", for the film's opening title sequence. The spy film screened at the Sedona Film Festival, Phoenix Film Festival, DC Shorts Film Festival and the HD Showcase in Toronto, Canada. Evenfall won the Audience Award at DC Shorts Film Festival in 2005 and played online at the AOL/moviefone Shorts Festival.

In 2006, Sapling Pictures co-produced Dead or Alive (a.k.a. Between Life and Death), a series pilot for Discovery International. The show received accolades for writing and cinematography and was awarded top honors from ITVA-DC.

The company received an Emmy Award for Discovery Channel's Gold Rush Alaska in 2013.

Beginning in 2015, Sapling Pictures produced a branded web series for the National Education Association, Fashion Makeover. Two seasons of the What Not To Wear styled series was produced for the 3MM members within the NEA membership. The series featured teachers getting a fashion makeover in appreciation for all they do for their students. The success of the series launched a companion series, Classroom Makeover, an HGTV inspired series coaching teachers on how to better organize their classroom.

== Productions ==
=== Broadcast and promotion ===
- Walking With Dinosaurs – Discovery Channel
- Wild, Wild World – Discovery Channel
- Mythbusters – Discovery Channel
- Deadliest Catch – Discovery Channel
- Dirty Jobs – Discovery Channel
- Shark Week – Discovery Channel
- American Chopper – TLC
- Dead or Alive – Discovery International
- Kids Going to College? – Fine Living
- Gold Rush: Alaska – Discovery Channel
- Finding Bigfoot – Animal Planet
- Impractical Jokers – truTV
- Doomsday Preppers – National Geographic Channel

=== Shorts and series ===
- Evenfall
- Open Door
- Posting
- Round 2
- Hangover Theory
- Fashion Makeover
- Putt-Putt Challenge
- Classroom Makeover
