= Geake =

Geake is a surname. Notable people with the surname include:

- Helen Geake (born 1967), British archaeologist
- John E. Geake (1925–1998), British astronomer
  - 9298 Geake, main-belt asteroid named after John E. Geake
