= Keith Jodoin =

American producer

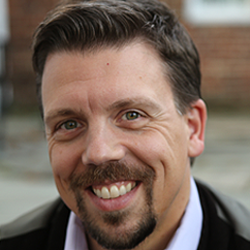
- Born: January 23, 1973 (age 52)
- Occupation(s): Writer, producer, director
- Years active: 1998–present
- Title: Founder, Sapling Pictures
- Awards: Emmy Award

Keith Jodoin (born January 23, 1973) is an American broadcast and digital media writer, producer and director. He has garnered more than 30 industry awards, including an Emmy Award for his work with Discovery Channel's Gold Rush Alaska.

== Career ==
After graduating from Syracuse University’s S.I. Newhouse School of Public Communications, Jodoin worked as a project manager at Henninger Media Services, a video post-production facility. In 1998, he launched Sapling Pictures, an independent television and digital media production company focusing on marketing and promotions for broadcasters such as Discovery Channel, truTV, National Geographic Channel, Animal Planet and TLC. Beginning in 2001, he began producing the weekly on-air promotions for Deadliest Catch, which became the highest-rated series on cable television. He has promoted other top television series, such as MythBusters, Impractical Jokers and Doomsday Preppers.

Jodoin wrote and directed his first short film, Evenfall, in 2003. Since then his short films have won awards at festivals all over the world. In 2006, he wrote, directed and produced Dead or Alive (aka Between Life and Death), a series pilot for Discovery International. The show was awarded numerous accolades for writing and cinematography.

In 2009 Jodoin began teaching at various schools around the Greater Washington, D.C. area and took a post teaching writing and directing courses at Boston University’s Center for Digital Imaging Arts (CDIA). Sapling Pictures began working with clients outside the broadcast television industry in 2011 and produced fundraising videos for the National Park Foundation and Children's National Medical Center, as well as social media campaigns for Marriott International and the National Education Association.

Since 2014, he has served as the VP of Media for the upcoming Museum of Science Fiction and its annual event, Escape Velocity. As a media specialist, he continues to speaks at film festivals and conferences around the country.

== Filmography ==
=== Broadcast Production and Promotion ===
- Walking With Dinosaurs - Discovery Channel
- Wild, Wild World - Discovery Channel
- Mythbusters - Discovery Channel
- Deadliest Catch - Discovery Channel
- Dead or Alive - Discovery International
- Kids Going to College? - Fine Living
- Gold Rush: Alaska - Discovery Channel
- Finding Bigfoot - Animal Planet
- Impractical Jokers - truTV
- Doomsday Preppers - National Geographic Channel
- Fish Bowl I - National Geographic Channel

=== Independent fiction ===
- Evenfall
- Open Door
- Posting
- Round 2
- Hangover Theory
