= Loch Ness Monster in popular culture =

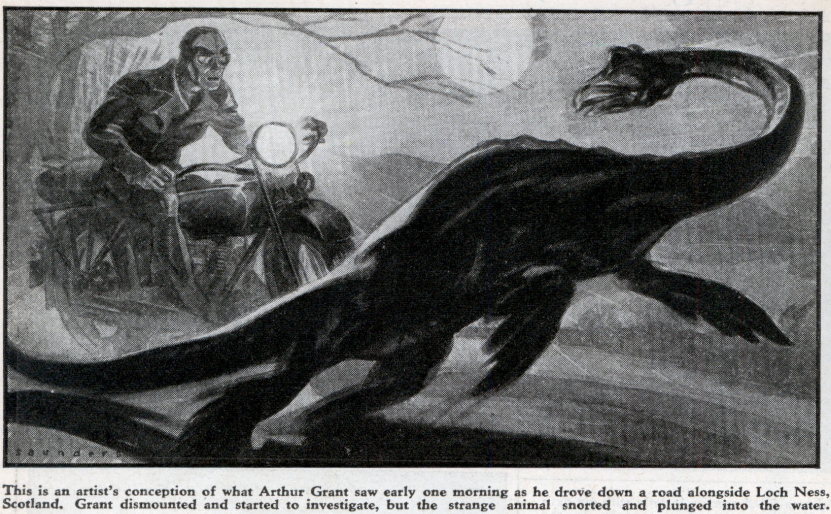
A depiction of one of the first purported sightings of the Loch Ness Monster, which has remained prominent in popular culture.

The Loch Ness Monster is a creature from folklore that has appeared in popular culture in various genres since at least 1934. It is most often depicted as a relict dinosaur or similar, but other explanations for its existence such as being a shapeshifter or from outer space also appear. It is only occasionally portrayed as threatening, despite its name.

== History ==
The monster has appeared in local folklore for centuries, and started receiving wider attention following a sighting in July 1933. It has made appearances in fiction literature since at least the January 1934 short story "The Monster of the Loch" by William J. Makin, and in film since at least the May 1934 film The Secret of the Loch.

Two genres where it has featured particularly prominently are children's literature and cryptofiction. Some examples of the former are the 1977 picture book The Mysterious Tadpole by Steven Kellogg where a child takes care of a creature that keeps growing larger, the 1992 novel Nessie the Mannerless Monster by Ted Hughes where the monster goes to London, and the 2007 novel Luck of the Loch Ness Monster: Tale of a Picky Eater by Alice Weaver Flaherty where the monster grows large by being inadvertently fed by a child discarding food. The latter genre includes works such as the 1982 novel Monster: A Tale of Loch Ness by Jeffrey Konvitz and the 2005 novel The Loch by Steve Alten.

It has also made appearances in science fiction such as the 1960 short story "The Loch Ness Terror" by Lionel Fanthorpe, comedy such as the 1961 film What a Whopper, fantasy such as the 1986 novel The Serpent Mage by Greg Bear, time-travel stories such as the 1997 Quantum Leap novel Loch Ness Leap by Sandy Schofield, and horror such as the 2001 film Beneath Loch Ness. An unusual mockumentary appearance is the 2004 film Incident at Loch Ness which depicts Zak Penn documenting Werner Herzog looking for the monster.

== Nature ==
The most common explanation for the monster's existence is that it is a prehistoric creature such as a plesiosaur, as in the 1959 short story "The Convenient Monster" by Leslie Charteris. It is depicted as being of extraterrestrial origin in some stories such as the 1972 short story "The Monster of Loch Ness" by Fred and Geoffrey Hoyle and the 1975 Doctor Who four-episode serial "Terror of the Zygons". A wholly supernatural explanation appears in the 1981 short story "The Horses of Lir" by Roger Zelazny, where it is a steed used by the titular deity. It is a shapeshifting creature stuck in its current form in the 1997 novel The Boggart and the Monster by Susan Cooper, and a dragon in both the 2008 novel Destiny Kills by Keri Arthur and the 2011 novel Dragon in the Mist by Nancy Lee Badger. In the 1990 children's novel The Water Horse by Dick King-Smith and its 2007 film adaptation The Water Horse: Legend of the Deep, the Loch Ness Monster is a kelpie, another type of creature from Scottish folklore. The Loch Ness Monster is not always a living creature; for instance, in the 1970 film The Private Life of Sherlock Holmes, it is a submarine. It is sometimes merely a hoax, as in the 2007 film Futurama: Bender's Big Score, and it is common for its existence to be ambiguous until the end in stories such as the 2004 film Scooby-Doo! and the Loch Ness Monster.

The issue of Loch Ness not being a sufficiently large body of water for a breeding population of very large animals is occasionally addressed. In the 1964 film 7 Faces of Dr. Lao the monster leaves the loch for the ocean to breed, and in the aforementioned book and film versions of The Water Horse, it reproduces asexually.

== Characteristics ==
Despite being called a monster, it is benign in the majority of works wherein it appears. Friendly versions of the creature appear in the 1996 films Loch Ness and Happy Ness: The Secret of the Loch, among others. The less common depiction of the monster as a threat appears in the 1981 film The Loch Ness Horror and the 2008 film Loch Ness Terror (a.k.a. Beyond Loch Ness). Some versions do not fall into either of these categories; for instance, in the aforementioned 7 Faces of Dr. Lao the monster is a tiny fish that grows into the familiar shape when out of the water, but remains comparatively harmless in its larger serpentine form.

== See also ==
- Loch Ness Monster in popular culture articles
- Bigfoot in popular culture
