= List of Finding Bigfoot episodes =

Finding Bigfoot is a documentary television series on Animal Planet. It premiered on May 30, 2011, and began its eighth season on January 3, 2016. The program follows four researchers and explorers investigating potential evidence of Bigfoot, a cryptid hominid allegedly living in the wildernesses of the United States and Canada. As of January 2016, the team has discovered multiple hair samples, which DNA shows as an 'unidentified primate', however they have failed to find any hard evidence of Bigfoot's existence. As of April 14, 2016, 90 episodes of Finding Bigfoot have aired.

== Series overview ==
Season	Episodes	Originally released	
Season	Episodes	First released	Last released
1	7	May 30, 2011	July 17, 2011
2	11	October 30, 2011	March 11, 2012
3	23	November 11, 2012	March 31, 2013
4	14	November 10, 2013	February 16, 2014
5	8	June 8, 2014	July 27, 2014
6	10	November 9, 2014	January 25, 2015
7	8	May 31, 2015	July 12, 2015
8	8	January 3, 2016	April 14, 2016
9	9	January 8, 2017	February 26, 2017

== Episodes ==
=== Season 1 (2011) ===
No. overall	No. in season	Title	Original release date
1	1	"Bigfoot Crossing in Georgia"	May 30, 2011
The team, in their first episode, are in Georgia investigating cases with Bigfoot. One thing they investigate is what a police officer believes to be a Bigfoot running across a road. Also, Cliff and Ranae find two possible footprints, and the Georgia chapter of the BFRO is called on to help a search.
2	2	"Swamp Ape"	June 5, 2011
The team visits Northern Florida investigating some mysterious cases with the Florida subspecies of Bigfoot, the Swamp Ape or Skunk Ape. They investigate a case about a couple that believes there is a Bigfoot living on their property and is bothering them. Also, the team talks with the Seminole people, asking about some experiences some members of the tribe have had with Bigfoot.
3	3	"Caught on Tape"	June 12, 2011
The team travels to North Carolina, specifically the Uwharrie National Forest to investigate supposed Bigfoot sightings. Also, tensions arise as Matt's leadership skills are called into question after he chases a bipedal figure, and the largest search for Bigfoot ever is organized.
4	4	"Fishing for Bigfoot in Oregon"	June 19, 2011
The team travels to Oregon to investigate multiple cases with sightings of Bigfoot. A group of rafters accidentally capture a video supposedly having a Bigfoot in it. Also, the team makes its first visit to Bigfoot and Beer, and then use a rabbit to try to lure out a sasquatch.
5	5	"Frozen Bigfoot"	June 26, 2011
The team heads to southern Washington to investigate cases involving Bigfoot encounters. One man caught a picture that may show a Bigfoot that is on a snowcapped mountain. Also, Matt and Bobo claim to hear what sounded like human voices during a night investigation, and Cliff and Ranae ride in a small raft to see if they can see a Bigfoot.
6	6	"Alaska's Bigfoot Island"	July 10, 2011
The team heads to southeast Alaska because the mayor of the town of Hydaburg asks them to investigate compelling footprint photos. Also, Ranae and Bobo find a possible footprint, and talk with a woman who claims to have had a log thrown at her taxi and spotted a Sasquatch in a tree the next day.
7	7	"Behind the Search"	July 17, 2011
The team returns to a gathering in Oregon at Ike's Pizza, called "Bigfoot and Beer" to talk personally to fans. The team talks about their excursions to find Bigfoot and reflect on them, answer questions from their fans, and play footage that was not aired on previous episodes.

=== Season 2 (2011–12) ===
No. overall	No. in season	Title	Original release date
8	1	"Birth of a Legend"	October 30, 2011
The team heads to the Mecca of Sasquatchery, Bluff Creek, California. While there they recreate the famous Patterson–Gimlin film, accompanied by Bob Gimlin himself. They also investigate the Marble Mountain footage. Later, while exploring the area, Ranae has an experience she's not likely to forget during one of the team’s best night investigations to date.
9	2	"Baby Bigfoot"	January 1, 2012
The team travels to New York state to investigate the New York Baby Footage. Ranae also spends some time alone near the site of the film, and dozens of witnesses come forward.
10	3	"Big Rhodey"	January 8, 2012
The team travels to Rhode Island to examine video of a roadside sighting of a bigfoot.
11	4	"Peeping Bigfoot"	January 15, 2012
The team travels to Minnesota to investigate howls recorded at a bigfoot hot spot and a sighting of what may be the tallest Bigfoot ever seen (11 feet tall).
12	5	"Canadian Bigfoot, Eh?"	January 22, 2012
The team travels to the Canadian Rockies in Alberta to investigate a unique bigfoot encounter caught on tape.
13	6	"Buckeye Bigfoot"	January 29, 2012
The team heads to Ohio to investigate an encounter with a bigfoot that is caught on tape. Along with a team of volunteers, they search the surrounding forests for evidence of a bigfoot.
14	7	"Virginia is for Bigfoot Lovers"	February 12, 2012
The team travels to Virginia to investigate video of what the locals are calling "the Beast of Gumhill."
15	8	"Moonshine and Bigfoot"	February 19, 2012
The team travels to Kentucky to investigate footage of glowing eyes that could belong to a bigfoot. The team tries a new search technique in the Daniel Boone National Forest.
16	9	"The Best of Finding Bigfoot"	February 26, 2012
A special that looks back at past Finding Bigfoot episodes.
17	10	"Hoosier Bigfoot"	March 4, 2012
The team travels to Indiana to investigate footage of a bigfoot caught in broad daylight.
18	11	"Holy Cow, it's a Bigfoot"	March 11, 2012
The team travels to Utah to investigate a mysterious tape of a supposed bigfoot.

=== Season 3 (2012–13) ===
No. overall	No. in season	Title	Original release date
19	1	"Untold Stories"	November 11, 2012
The gang talk about their bigfoot experiences.
20	2	"Ripped From the Headlines"	November 11, 2012
The team is in Pocatello, Idaho investigating video evidence that is garnering national media attention. The video, shot by local high school students, briefly shows an unidentified creature turning away from them and walking into the forest. The team enlists the world's leading academic expert on bigfoots to help them out, and after chatting with several other eyewitnesses from the area, they devise an unusual game plan they believe may prove the mystery of bigfoots true once and for all.
21	3	"Mother Bigfoot"	November 18, 2012
A trail camera photo of what may be a sasquatch carrying her youngling through an apple orchard draws the team of bigfoot investigators deep into Vermont. This area of the Adirondack Corridor has a rich history of sasquatch sightings and compelling accounts of recent activity, and the team is eager to search for bigfoots. The investigators narrow down the search grid to the forest surrounding a local reservoir and takes to land and water in hopes of flushing out one of these mysterious creatures.
22	4	"CSI Bigfoot"	November 25, 2012
The team is in central Oklahoma for what may be their big break. Recent physical evidence has turned up and it may actually be bigfoot DNA. The investigators interview witnesses in the area and learn that there are several reporter sightings near local waterways. The team deploys a stealth technique they believe may prove that sasquatches do indeed live just miles from Oklahoma City.
23	5	"The Sierra Spy"	December 2, 2012
The Sierra Nevada Mountains of California are a hot spot for bigfoot activity, and the team is travelling near Fresno to investigate multiple sightings. The investigators visit with a local Native American tribe that confirms that sasquatches have inhabited the mountain region for centuries. With the reaffirmation from the Native American tribe, the team is determined to locate a sasquatch and attempts to cash in on the curiosity of these mysterious creatures by breaking out a relic from the past that they believe can prove bigfoots run wild in the Golden State.
24	6	"Dances With Bigfoot"	December 9, 2012
The team is in Arizona's Mogollon Rim to investigate sightings of what locals have described as a bigfoot. Before launching a full-on investigation, the team searches for clues that Arizona's habitat could support these elusive creatures, and they come across what may be a training ground for juvenile sasquatches. Then, with help from a local Apache Indian tribe, the team sets out to prove bigfoots do call Arizona home.
25	7	"Bigfoot and Wolverines"	December 16, 2012
The Finding Bigfoot team has traveled deep into the forests and mountains of Northern Michigan to investigate a very promising message left on the BFRO hotline. With a wealth of recent reports from this area, the team takes to the deep woods in one their most successful night investigations ever.
26	8	"Bobo Marks His Turf"	December 23, 2012
New Mexico is dubbed the "Land of Enchantment," and the team is in the Jemez Mountains to investigate a thermal video image captured during a Bigfoot Field Researchers Organization (BFRO) expedition. Through the testimonials of local eyewitnesses, the team discovers that this particular bigfoot may be residing in the Valles Caldera, a National Preserve which hosts vast herds of elk. Forested canyons surround the park, and the team of investigators believes it's found the perfect habitat for the world's largest and most mysterious apex predator. In a stealthy attempt to pinpoint this elusive beast, the team takes to the friendly skies via a hot air balloon.
27	9	"Australian Yowie"	December 30, 2012
The team takes an unprecedented trip across the globe to investigate recent eyewitness reports of yowies terrorizing locals in Australia's FFD700 Coast. Yowies are mysterious creatures described as bipedal, apex predators with brown fur, and the team must use their sasquatch expertise to track down where these creatures may be. With help from local witnesses and experts, the investigators traverse deep into Australia's jungle in hopes of proving bigfoot's cousin down under is in fact real. (120 Minute special episode)
28	10	"Squatch Spies"	January 6, 2013
Reports of howls in Washington state by local Bigfoot researchers give the team a chance to use its high-tech thermal equipment to investigate.
29	11	"Bacon for Bigfoot"	January 13, 2013
The mayor of a small town in Louisiana calls upon the bigfoot team to investigate unusual activity in his community. To lure in these mysterious creatures, the team deploys a new baiting technique and discovers convincing evidence themselves.
30	12	"Bigfoot Merit Badge"	January 20, 2013
The team travels to Colorado to investigate footage of a possible bigfoot, predating the famous Patterson-Gimlin film by five years. They narrow down their search grid and call upon the aid of a Girl Scout troop to help bait a bigfoot..
31	13	"Bigfoot Hoedown"	January 27, 2013
The team travels to West Virginia to investigate photographs from a young bigfooter that may depict a sasquatch in his own backyard. The team sets out to get their own photographic proof and deploys a baiting technique not for the faint of heart.
32	14	"Badlands Bigfoot"	February 10, 2013
The team meets with witnesses from the Lakota Sioux, who claim Bigfoots roam the Pine Ridge Indian Reservation. After zeroing in on a hot spot, the team is granted special access to private land where they just might find the Lakota's legendary Tall Man.
33	15	"Indonesia's Little Bigfoot"	February 17, 2013
The Finding Bigfoot team journeys to the Kerinci region on the island of Sumatra in search of Indonesia's elusive Orang Pendek, venturing into the unfamiliar jungle in hopes of proving this mythical creature is in fact real.
34	16	"More Untold Stories (Squatchers Without Borders)"	February 17, 2013
Go behind the scenes for a second time with the Finding Bigfoot team as they reveal more stories of their quest that never make it onto the show. Get the inside scoop on their recent trips to Indonesia and Australia; find out how the cast handles hoaxers. (This airs AFTER Indonesia's Little Bigfoot)
35	17	"Peek-A-Boo Bigfoot"	February 24, 2013
The team travels to the Great Smokies of Tennessee to investigate trail camera photos that may show a sasquatch living in these mountains. After witnesses share stories, the team enlists the aid of professional hog callers to try and bait a hungry bigfoot.
36	18	"Bigfoot and the Redhead"	March 3, 2013
The team travels to Pennsylvania to meet with teenagers who may have filmed a bigfoot while riding go-karts. A packed town hall leads them to the Allegheny National Forest, where they deploy a unique search technique to try and elicit a response from a bigfoot.
37	19	"Bigfoot Loves Barbeque"	March 10, 2013
The team travels to Connecticut to investigate a video of a possible bigfoot captured by a mother recording her children at play. In one of the most populated states, they meet with locals and set up a bait trap in hopes of luring in any hungry bigfoots.
38	20	"Oregon: Virgin Bigfoot"	March 17, 2013
The team returns to Oregon to investigate a record number of bigfoot tracks originally cast and documented by Cliff. As they zero in on a recent hotspot, the team deploys a dangerous technique to increase their odds of capturing this elusive creature.
39	21	"Bigfoot the Friendly Ghost"	March 24, 2013
The team travels to Illinois to meet a man who claims to have recorded bigfoot howls in his own backyard. Several witnesses share their sightings of these creatures in some unusual locations, including a graveyard and a highway interchange.
40	22	"Vietnam: The Heart of Squatchness"	March 31, 2013
The team travels to the dense jungles in Phong Nha-Ke Bang National Park of Vietnam to search for what U.S. soldiers reported as "Rock Apes", and what the Vietnamese call "The Wildman".
41	23	"Untold Stories: Behind the Squatch"	March 31, 2013
Go behind the scenes for a third time with the Finding Bigfoot team as they reveal more stories of their quest that never make it onto the show. Get the inside scoop on Matt's method for resting between interviews and a behind-the-scenes look at Bobo's life (and bachelor pad) away from the show. (This aired AFTER Vietnam: The Heart of Squatchness)

=== Season 4 (2013–14) ===
No. overall	No. in season	Title	Original release date
42	1	"Untold Stories: Welcome Back Squatchers"	November 10, 2013
Untold Stories: Welcome Back Squatchers
43	2	"The Legend of Boggy Creek"	November 10, 2013
The team travels to Fouke, Arkansas, home of the 1972 bigfoot documentary, "The Legend of Boggy Creek." With a long history of sightings near this small town, the team takes to the surrounding swamps in hopes of proving Arkansas' bigfoot is more than a legend.
44	3	"Surf's Up, Sasquatch"	November 17, 2013
The team travels to Santa Cruz, California to visit the Bigfoot Discovery Museum. The museum's owner directs them to recent eyewitnesses and secret hotspots. Bobo hopes the smells from an authentic Hawaiian luau will be too much for nearby bigfoots to resist
45	4	"Best Evidence Yet"	November 24, 2013
The team returns to Florida to investigate thermal footage of a possible bigfoot. Convinced of the evidence, they revisit witnesses from previous expeditions and narrow their search to a recent hotspot.
46	5	"Kung-Fu Bigfoot"	December 1, 2013
The team travels to China in search of the Yeren, a bi-pedal, hair-covered ape similar to bigfoot. Little is known about this elusive creature, but the team uses their bigfooting skills to try and prove China's Yeren is more than just legend.
47	6	"Sketching Sasquatch"	December 8, 2013
The team travels to the California/Nevada border to investigate audio recordings of a possible sasquatch obtained near Lake Tahoe. While blasting calls throughout multiple valleys in the Sierras, they discover some of their best evidence to date. Matt and Ranae find some evidence of themselves during the night investigation.
48	7	"Lonestar Squatch"	December 15, 2013
The team travels to East Texas to investigate thermal footage that may show a bigfoot spying on a campsite. Convinced by the evidence, they enlist the aid of primate tracking dogs in hopes of proving bigfoots do roam the Lone Star State.
49	8	"Abominable Snowman"	December 29, 2013
The team from Finding Bigfoot travel around the world to Nepal in search of the infamous Yeti. They visit monasteries with Yeti relics, talk to firsthand witnesses and travel into the dense forests of the Himalayas. Will they succeed in finding evidence?
50	9	"Big Sky Bigfoot"	January 5, 2014
The team travels to big sky country to investigate sasquatch activity near the city of Bozeman, Montana. After meeting witnesses, they enlist the aid of a dog sled team to take them into a nearby valley, where they set up a fake deer trap to lure a bigfoot.
51	10	"Bigfoot of Oz"	January 12, 2014
The team travels to the heartland to determine if bigfoots live on the great plains of Kansas. With help from eyewitnesses, they narrow their search to waterways outside of Wichita where they take to the sky and employ a unique baiting technique.
52	11	"Super Yooper Sasquatch"	January 19, 2014
The team go to Michigan to investigate a photo of an alleged Bigfoot on the Upper Peninsula, where witnesses claim the beasts have been stalking them.
53	12	"South Jersey Sasquatch"	January 26, 2014
The team travel to New Jersey to investigate a foot cast of an alleged Bigfoot; they also speculate on sightings of the Jersey Devil possibly being misidentified Bigfoot sightings.
54	13	"Coal Miner's Bigfoot"	February 9, 2014
The team travels back to West Virginia to investigate recent recordings of possible Bigfoot howls. With the help of a radio show, the team reaches out to witnesses from across the state and rafts deep into the holler in hopes of finding a bigfoot.
55	14	"1, 2, 3, 4, I Declare a Squatch War"	February 16, 2014
The team travels back to the Pacific Northwest to determine the "squatchiest" state in the U.S. With the team evenly divided and a friendly wager made, Bobo and Cliff head to Oregon while Matt and Ranae head to Washington to see which state is "squatchier".

=== Season 5 (2014) ===
No. overall	No. in season	Title	Original release date
56	1	"Bigfoot Call of the Wildman"	June 8, 2014
In the fifth-season premiere, the team go to Kentucky to inspect casts of alleged Bigfoot tracks, and spend some with Ernie Brown Jr. (aka Turtleman) who recalls a chilling childhood encounter with a mysterious beast.
57	2	"Squatters for Sasquatch"	June 15, 2014
The team travels to Virginia where a trail camera photo may contain the image of a possible juvenile Sasquatch.
58	3	"Beast of the Bayou"	June 22, 2014
The Bigfoot team investigates a trail camera photo taken in Louisiana's bayou country that may contain the image of a possible Sasquatch.
59	4	"Squatching in a Winter Wonderland"	June 29, 2014
A trip to Washington state to investigate 50 years of alleged Bigfoot sightings in the Blue Mountains includes a meeting with anthropology professor Jeff Meldrum of Idaho State University.
60	5	"Live to Squatch Another Day"	July 6, 2014
The team's search in Oklahoma appears to yield positive results with the use of a cherry picker and some music to spot a Bigfoot, but they also find themselves in danger on their last night in the state.
61	6	"Bama Bigfoot"	July 13, 2014
The team go to Alabama to explore the forests of an area the locals call Creepy Mountain, where they design a special search technique after examining thermal footage.
62	7	"Bobo's Backyard"	July 20, 2014
The team go to California to investigate unusual photographs taken in a Redwood forest not far from Bobo's home in Humboldt County.
63	8	"Biggest Search Yet"	July 27, 2014
In this special episode the team embark on their biggest investigation yet. They cast the widest net possible to find a sasquatch starting from the Four Corners Monument to explore the southwestern U.S. states of Arizona, Colorado, New Mexico and Utah.

=== Season 6 (2014–15) ===
No. overall	No. in season	Title	Original release date
64	1	"Turtleman's Bigfoot"	November 9, 2014
The investigators travel once more to the state of Kentucky to inspect some recent casts of bigfoot tracks. After a wild night with Ernie the Turtleman, they have a terrifying night of their own using Louisville Sluggers for knockers.
65	2	"Squatching in the Midnight Sun"	November 9, 2014
New evidence brings the team back to Alaska, where they decide to divide and conquer. While Matt and Bobo are down in the small village of Bethel, Ranae and Cliff are investigating near Fairbanks.
66	3	"Untold Stories: Alaska Behind the Scenes"	November 9, 2014
67	4	"Baked Potato Bigfoot"	November 16, 2014
The team travels to Idaho to search for Bigfoot. After sending a scout team of researchers ahead of the group, Matt, Cliff, Bobo, and Renae with one researcher into four groups to search the state. They put an elaborate plan in order to search for the state's Gem State squatch.
68	5	"Squatchers Take New Jersey"	November 23, 2014
Fascinating evidence convinces the team to go back to New Jersey, and surprisingly squatchy state. After a night investigation and a town hall meeting, Cliff departs from the team to investigate with his friend, comedian Bobcat Goldthwait.
69	6	"British Bigfoot"	January 4, 2015
The team heads to the United Kingdom to investigate possible sasquatch sightings. Bobo and Cliff head to Scotland where they search for sasquatches near the famed Loch Ness, while Matt and Ranae search for bigfoots in England.
70	7	"Untold Stories: UK Behind the Scenes"	January 4, 2015
71	8	"Matt Goes Home"	January 11, 2015
The Team Goes to Northeast Ohio to Investigate Matt's First Sighting.
72	9	"Bigfoot Basecamp"	January 18, 2015
The team return to the land of 10,000 lakes, Minnesota, to investigate some foot track from March 2013.
73	10	"Paranormal Squatchtivity"	January 25, 2015
The team travels to the eerie woods of Pennsylvania to investigate haunted forests that might be home to both sasquatch and specters.

=== Season 7 (2015) ===
No. overall	No. in season	Title	Original release date
74	1	"Atomic Bigfoot"	May 31, 2015
The team is in eastern Tennessee, where they have had success in the past. But they quickly discover the area is shrouded in mystery. This episode was available online from December 21, 2014 before being broadcast much later.
75	2	"Amazon Squatchin"	May 31, 2015
This Special 2-hour premiere episode has the team investigating the mythical Mapinguari in the Amazon rainforest.
76	3	"Squatchin' In the Sunshine State"	June 7, 2015
The team heads back to Florida to investigate some footage of a reported Bigfoot.
77	4	"The Secret Squatch Spot"	June 14, 2015
The team heads for the first time to South Carolina to investigate photos of reported Bigfoot tracks in the snow.
78	5	"Squatchsploitation"	June 21, 2015
The team heads to the Caddo Lake area of Louisiana.
79	6	"A Squatch In the Ozarks"	June 28, 2015
The team heads to Missouri to investigate the legend of the blue man.
80	7	"The Best Little Bigfoot in Texas"	July 12, 2015
The team moseys on back to Texas to hunt down a juvenile bigfoot by the tracks they believe were made by it.
81	8	"Bigfoot State of Mind"	July 12, 2015
Team heads to the Adirondack mountains of New York.

=== Season 8 (2016) ===
No. overall	No. in season	Title	Original release date
82	1	"Squatch Wars: U.S. vs. Canada"	January 3, 2016
The team sets out to discover which country is squatchier -- USA or Canada.
83	2	"Bigfoot's Maine Event"	January 10, 2016
Matt records multiple howlings and is confident he has pinned down a Pine Tree Sasquatch when the team makes its first trip to Maine.
84	3	"Grand Bigfoot Hotel"	January 17, 2016
The team reports to the Mount Washington resort in New Hampshire where bigfoot sightings have been unnerving hotel guests. Mounting evidence points to Franconia Notch, where the team blasts calls from an alpine horn, hoping to herd in a bigfoot.
85	4	"A Few Good Squatchers"	January 24, 2016
The team returns to Georgia to investigate the Fort Stewart area.
86	5	"Dronie Loves Squatchie"	January 31, 2016
For the fourth time, Cliff returns with his friends, and a few professional drone pilots, to his home state of Oregon.
87	6	"Supernatural Bigfoot"	March 31, 2016
The team joins a paranormal investigation group in Mount Shasta, California, except for Bobo, who joins the SBC for the week.
88	7	"Squatching on Sacred Ground"	April 7, 2016
The team gets invited to go squatching in the Klamath reservation in Southern Oregon, where Bigfoots are sighted regularly.
89	8	"The Booger Hole"	April 14, 2016
The team goes to Mississippi for the 1st time to meet with a BFRO investigator, who is investigating bigfoot reports in a new way.

=== Season 9 (2017) ===
No. overall	No. in season	Title	Original release date
90	1	"The Family That Squatches Together"	January 8, 2017
The team recruit their friends and family for an all-out search for a Sasquatch high up in the Appalachian Mountains.
91	2	"Hawaii's Little Foot"	January 15, 2017
A trip to Hawaii takes the team to three islands to investigate reports of legendary little people called Menehune.
92	3	"Return to Four Corners"	January 22, 2017
The Four Corners Monument, where Arizona, Colorado, New Mexico and Utah meet, is revisited, and the team finds that all previous witnesses have new stories of Bigfoot activity.
93	4	"Skeptic Showdown"	January 29, 2017
The team invites a group of skeptics in Arkansas to join them on an expedition; the skeptics put up a large bounty for proof of bigfoot's existence.
94	5	"Squatchy Tonk"	January 29, 2017
The team attends a bigfoot festival on the outskirts of the music city, Nashville; the team decides to use a country superstar as bait after a bizarre revelation occurs.
95	6	"Bright Lights and Bigfoots"	February 12, 2017
The search for squatch brings the team to Southern California, where reports have been rampant. They zero in on the canyons of Deep Creek, enlisting the help of an L.A. local for a night investigation that yields proof that sasquatches live here.
96	7	"Bigfoot Town"	February 12, 2017
The team travels to Remer, Minnesota to investigate this small town's claim to be the "Home of Bigfoot." As evidence continues to mount, the team pursues an exciting hot-off-the-press lead on a sighting and a footprint on their final investigation.
97	8	"Brews, Brats and Bigfoots"	February 19, 2017
The team travels to Wisconsin for the first time on the heels of recent bigfoot activity, enlisting help from locals to investigate reports; they take the final night investigation to new heights as bigfoots stalk them in the dark.
98	9	"The Squatchland"	February 26, 2017
The team goes to Iowa to investigate a long history of reports of Bigfoot activity in and around the Yellow River State Forest.
