= Nerd (disambiguation) =

A nerd is a person who is intellectually knowledgeable or bright, but socially inept.

Nerd(s) or The Nerd(s) may also refer to:

== Arts and entertainment ==
=== Fictional characters ===
- Nerd, a fictional creature from Dr. Seuss's 1950 book If I Ran the Zoo
- The Nerd, a character from the Adult Swim animated series Robot Chicken
- The Nerd, the main character in the Angry Video Game Nerd web series that started in 2004

=== Television ===
- FC Nerds, reality television sports franchise
- Nerds FC, a 2006 Australian television soccer documentary series
- The Nerds, a 1979 series of Saturday Night Live sketches

=== Other media ===
- N.E.R.D.S., a book series
- The Nerd (play), a 1981 Broadway comedy play written by Larry Shue
- N.E.R.D., a rock/hip hop group fronted by Pharrell Williams
- Nerds 2.0.1, a 1998 documentary film
- NERD, a science and technology journal published by students of the Indian Institute of Technology Kanpur

== Businesses ==
- NERD (television production company), a company associated with Survivor creator Charlie Parsons
- Nintendo European Research & Development, a French subsidiary of Nintendo

== Medicine ==
- Nodules–eosinophilia–rheumatism–dermatitis–swelling syndrome (NERDS syndrome)
- Nonerosive reflux disease, a form of gastroesophageal reflux disease
- NSAID-exacerbated respiratory disease (N-ERD)

== Other uses ==
- Navy eReader Device (NeRD), e-reader developed by the United States Navy
- NERD (sabermetrics), a baseball statistic
- Nerds (candy), a candy
- N3RD Street, nickname for a segment of North 3rd Street, Philadelphia, US

== See also ==
- NERTZ, a podcast by Mathew Klickstein
- King of the Nerds, an American game shows series from 2013
- King of the Nerds (British TV series), a British version from 2015
- Revenge of the Nerds (film series)
- Nurd (disambiguation)
