= Green Wake =

- cover to issue #1

Publication information
- Publisher: Image Comics
- Schedule: Monthly
- Format: Ongoing series
- No. of issues: 10

Creative team
- Written by: Kurtis J. Wiebe
- Artist: Riley Rossmo

Green Wake is a horror comic book series published by Image comics in 2011. The series takes place in the forgotten town of Green Wake, where a string of mutilated murder victims lead detectives Morley Mack and Kreiger in search of a young woman named Ariel, their prime suspect. When a stranger arrives in town with startling connections to Ariel, Morley discovers a dark link between the case and his past. It only ran 10 of the planned 25 issues, due to a lack of sales.

== Reception ==
The series received positive reviews from critics, often praising the book for its experimental and enigmatic tone. Comic Book Resources called it "the strongest debut of 2011". Kurtis J. Wiebe won the 2012 Joe Shuster Award for Outstanding Writer for his work on the series.
