= Sasquatch Pushing Over a House =

Sculpture in Seattle, Washington, U.S.

- Artist: Richard Beyer
- Year: 1982
- Type: Sculpture
- Medium: Sculpture: aluminum, wood, Cor-Ten steel Base: concrete
- Subject: Sasquatch
- Condition: "Treatment needed" (1995)
- Location: Seattle, Washington, United States; 47.664316°N 122.319679°W

Sasquatch Pushing Over a House is an outdoor 1982 sculpture by Richard Beyer, installed Seattle's University Playground, in the U.S. state of Washington.

== Description ==
The sculpture, installed at the intersection of Northeast 50th and 9th Avenue in University Playground, depicts a full-length cast aluminum Sasquatch pushing against a house frame with its proper left shoulder, while its proper right leg is extended back for leverage. The tilted frame, which is made of wood and Cor-Ten steel, is painted blue and has joining pieces that are painted red and yellow. The sculpture measures approximately 10 feet (3.0 m) x 18 feet (5.5 m) x 16 feet (4.9 m) and rests on a concrete base that measures approximately 4 inches (10 cm) x 1.5 feet (46 cm) x 5.75 feet (175 cm).

== History ==
Richard Beyer completed the sculpture, which was commissioned by the Seattle Department of Parks and Recreation, in 1982. The work was surveyed and deemed "treatment needed" by the Smithsonian Institution's "Save Outdoor Sculpture!" program in 1995.

== See also ==
- 1982 in art
- Bigfoot in popular culture
