= Nurd =

Nurd or Nurds may refer to:

- Mi-2/NuRD complex, in molecular biology
- Nerd or nurd, an awkward person
- Nurds, a 1980 album by the Roches

== See also ==
- Nerd (disambiguation)
