= Navy eReader Device =

E-reader developed by the United States Navy

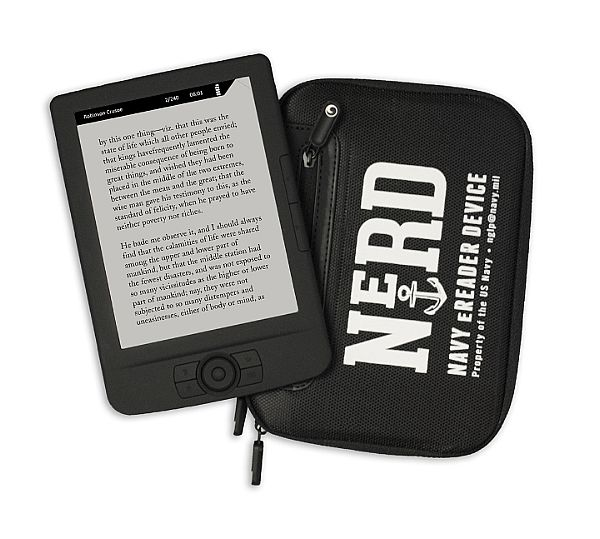
- Also known as: NeRD
- Developer: United States Navy
- Manufacturer: Findaway World
- Type: E-reader
- Released: May 2014
- Display: E Ink
- Connectivity: None

Navy eReader Device (NeRD) is an e-reader developed in collaboration between the United States Navy's General Library Program and Findaway World to provide books aboard its submarines. This device is not available to the general public.

== E-reader ==
Released in May 2014, the device gives sailors access to the Navy's library and various books while on a submarine with limited storage space for paper books. The first release included around 350 devices, and each submarine was assigned five NeRDs.

It has adjustable font types and sizes, includes a carrying case. For security purposes, the device is not equipped with internet capabilities.

== Titles included ==
The device contains 300 pre-loaded books across a wide variety of genres, including many Tom Clancy and James Patterson novels. Some of the included books:

- Most of the 18 titles in the Chief of Naval Operations' Professional Reading Program
- A Game of Thrones
- The Lord of the Rings
- The Amazing Adventures of Kavalier & Clay
- Bossypants
- The Lion, the Witch and the Wardrobe
- Into the Wild
- 1776
- To Kill a Mockingbird
- Bible (King James Version)
- Quran
- Book of Mormon
