= Riley Rossmo =

Canadian comic book artist and illustrator

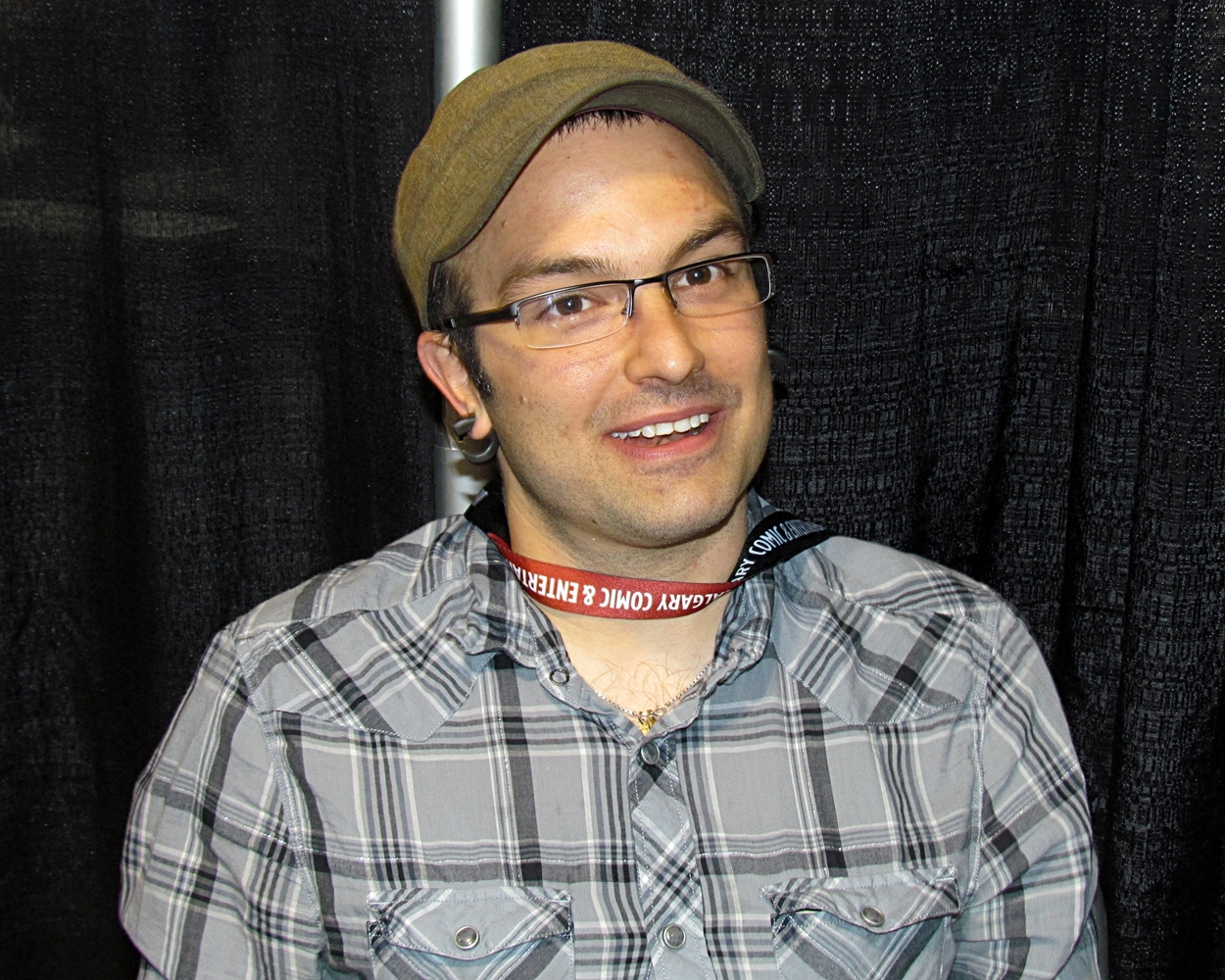
- Rossmo in 2012
- Born: Saskatoon
- Areas: Penciller, Inker
- Notable works: Proof; Cowboy Ninja Viking; Green Wake

Riley Rossmo is a Canadian comic book artist and illustrator, known for his work on various Image Comics titles, as well as Marvel Comics' Daken: Dark Wolverine. Rossmo is an instructor at the Alberta College of Art and Design.

== Personal life ==
Originally from Saskatoon, Saskatchewan, Rossmo now lives in Calgary, Alberta, Canada.

== Career ==
Rossmo is a graduate of the Alberta College of Art and Design. His first professional work was producing illustrations for publications such as Avenue, Calgary Inc, WestJet magazine and Scratch.

His first comic book work was a collaboration with writer Alex Grecian on Seven Sons, a graphic novel based on a Chinese folk legend. In 2007, he started work on Proof, also with Alex Grecian. Later, he collaborated with writer A.J. Lieberman on Cowboy Ninja Viking (2008–2011). Despite featuring a violent action story about an assassin with multiple personalities, Disney purchased film rights to the story, assigning writers Rhett Reese and Paul Wernick to write a screenplay.

In March, 2011, Rossmo's first issue of Green Wake, with writer Kurtis J. Wiebe, was released. For Green Wake Rossmo adopted a limited palette, using different colors to indicate different times or states of reality in the narrative. Despite critical success, sales flagged after the second issue leading Rossmo and Wiebe to end the series early. They have since announced that they are working together again on a mini-series titled Debris to be published in July, 2012.

Rebel Blood is a horror comic about an infectious disease outbreak that affects both humans and animals. Published in March, 2012, this was the first comic that credited Rossmo as a writer. Co-written with Alex Link, the remote wilderness setting in the story was influenced by Rossmo's experiences canoeing at Waskesui.

Rossmo and Alex Link are collaborating again on Drumhellar (originally titled Strangeways), released by Image Comics' Shadowline, with issue 1 released in November 2013.

Rossmo and writer Ales Kot are working on Wild Children, a graphic novella about students rebelling against their teachers.

Rossmo has cited Bill Sienkiewicz's illustrations for The New Mutants comic books as a major early influence on his art style.

== Bibliography ==
=== AiT/Planet Lar ===
- Seven Sons (with Alex Grecian, TPB, October 2006, 88 pages, ISBN 978-1-932051-46-9)

=== Boom Studios ===
- Curse #1-6 (January 2014-April 2014, with Michael Moreci, Boom Studios)

=== DC Comics ===
- Constantine: The Hellblazer Vol. 1 #1-12 (June 2015-May 2016, with Ming Doyle)
- Batman Vol. 2 #52 (July 2016)
- Batman Vol. 3 #7, 8, Annual #1 (September–December 2016)
- Suicide Squad Vol. 5 #9 (January 2017)
- Dark Knight III: The Master Race #8, variant cover (March 2017)
- Batman/The Shadow #1-6 (April–September 2017)
- Dark Knights: The Batman Who Laughs #1 (November 2017)
- Deathbed #1-6 (Vertigo Comics) (February–July 2018, with Joshua Williamson)
- Justice League: No Justice #3 (May 2018)
- Justice League Dark Vol. 3 #4, Annual #1 (October 2018-July 2019)
- Martian Manhunter Vol. 5 #1-12 (December 2018-February 2020)
- Young Justice Vol. 6 #12, variant cover (October 2019)
- The Green Lantern Vol. 1 #12, variant cover (October 2019)
- Batman and the Outsiders Vol. 4 Annual #1, variant cover (October 2019)
- The Terrifics Vol. 1 #22, variant cover (November 2019)
- Wonder Woman Vol. 1 #750 (January 2020)
- Harley Quinn Vol. 3 #71, 75 (March–August 2020)
- The Flash Vol. 1 #750 (March 2020)
- Legion of Super Heroes Vol. 8 #9 (September 2020)
- Detective Comics #1027, (September 2020)
- Dark Nights: Death Metal Robing King #1, (October 2020)
- Batgirl Vol. 4 #50, variant cover (October 2020)
- Future State: Legion of Super Heroes #1-2 (January–February 2021)
- Batman Black and White Vol. 5 #4 (March 2021, with Joshua Williamson)
- Harley Quinn Vol. 4 #1- (March 2021 – present)
- Nightwing Vol. 4 #78, variant cover (March 2021)
- Legends of the Dark Knight Vol. 2 #2, variant cover (June 2021)
- Suicide Squad Vol. 7 #6, variant cover (August 2021)
- Justice League Infinity Vol. 1 #7 (January 2022)
- Tim Drake: Robin Vol. 1 #1-6 (September 2022 – June 2023)
- Wesley Dodds: The Sandman Vol.1 #1-6 (October 2023 – March 2024)

=== Image Comics ===
- Proof (October 2007 – 2012, with Alex Grecian):
  - Volume 1: Goatsucker (TPB, June 2008, 128 pages, ISBN 978-1-58240-944-3)
  - Book 2: The Company of Men (TPB, December 2008, 128 pages, ISBN 978-1-60706-017-8)
  - Book 3: Thunderbirds Are Go! (TPB, July, 2009, 144 pages, ISBN 978-1-60706-134-2)
  - Book 4: Julia (TPB, July, 2010, 128 pages, ISBN 978-1-60706-285-1)
  - Book 5: Blue Fairies (TPB, December, 2010, 128 pages, ISBN 978-1-60706-348-3)
  - Book 6: Endangered (TPB, June, 2011, 128 pages, ISBN 978-1-60706-391-9)
- Cowboy Ninja Viking (October 2009 – 2010, with A.J. Lieberman):
  - Volume 1 (collects #1-5, TPB, June 2008, 160 pages, ISBN 978-1-60706-261-5)
  - Volume 2 (collects #6-10, TPB, February 2011, 160 pages, ISBN 978-1-60706-344-5)
  - Deluxe Edition (collects #1-10, hc, October 2013, 304 pages, ISBN 978-1-60706-780-1)
- Green Wake (April 2011-February 2012, with Kurtis J. Wiebe):
  - Volume 1 (collects #1-5, TPB, October 2011, 136 pages, ISBN 978-1-60706-432-9)
  - Volume 2: Lost Children (collects #6-10, TPB, May 2012, 136 pages, ISBN 978-1-60706-525-8)
- Rebel Blood (March 2012-June 2012, with Alex Link):
  - Rebel Blood (collects #1-4, TPB, October 2012, 128 pages, ISBN 978-1-60706-591-3)
- Debris (July 2012-October 2012, with Kurtis J. Wiebe):
  - Debris (Collects #1-4, TPB, February 2013, 128 pages, ISBN 978-1-60706-720-7)
- Bedlam #1-6 (October 2012-April 2013, with Nick Spencer, Image Comics):
  - Volume 1 (collects #1-6, TPB, May 2013, 184 pages, ISBN 978-1-60706-735-1)
- Dia de Los Muertos (February 2013-May 2013, with Alex Link, Christopher Long, Dirk Manning, Jeff Mariotte, Ed Brisson, Joshua Williamson, Kurtis Wiebe, Joe Keatinge and Alexander Grecian):
  - Dia de Lost Muertos (collects #1-3, TPB, November 2013, 128 pages, ISBN 978-1-60706-807-5)

=== Marvel Comics ===
- Daken: Dark Wolverine #10-12 (Big Break), #13-15 (Moonwalk) #21-23 (Lost Weekend) (June 2011-May 2012):
  - Big Break (collects #9.1, #10-12, hc, October 2011, 112 pages, ISBN 978-0-78515-673-4)
  - The Pride Comes Before the Fall (collects #13-19, hc, February 2012, 152 pages, ISBN 978-0-78515-235-4)
  - No More Heroes (collects #20-23, TPB, December 2012, 112 pages, ISBN 978-0-78516-089-2)
