= The Geek =

1971 pornographic film

- DVD released by Something Weird Video
- Starring: Lynn Holmes; Nora Wieternik; Ric Lutze
- Production company: Brutus Productions
- Distributed by: Brutus Productions
- Release dates: July 7, 1971 (San Francisco, California)
- Running time: 56 minutes
- Country: United States
- Language: English

The Geek is a pornographic film released in 1971. It is about a group of adults hiking and camping, that are eventually ambushed by Bigfoot. Despite the small cast, only three actors that feature have been identified.

== Plot ==
As shots of a forest are shown, a title card states that for the last two centuries there have been tales of a being that is half man, half beast prowling the Northwest. Some call it the Sasquatch, and others refer to it as "The Geek". As the narrator describes the Geek and similar beings that have been sighted throughout the world, three hippie couples drive up in their van and head off with camping gear, not realizing that they are being watched from a far hill by a humanoid figure.

The sextet traverses the wilderness for thirty miles, eventually stopping to set up camp, as the narrators informs the viewer that the couples are in search of indisputable evidence of the existence of the Geek. While the others work, newlyweds John and Valerie go off alone to have sex, later returning to the campsite, where it is agreed that the group will go further east, into uncharted territory. In their tent, two of the campers have sex, and afterward the man admits that he was a virgin, his only prior sexual experience being when his sister allowed him to fondle her breasts.

The next day, the group discovers a large footprint, and stake out a nearby ridge. The Geek appears, and rapes one of the women when she approaches it. The beast then goes after Valerie, and rapes her as well. The men attack the Geek, but it fights them off, and escapes. As the wounded campers limp away, one of them vows "Some day I'm going to get that filthy animal!"

== Cast ==
- Lynn Holmes as Camper in White Shorts
- Nora Wieternik as Camper in Black Shorts
- Ric Lutze as Camper

== Reception ==
The Bloody Pit of Horror gave The Geek zero stars, and labeled it "abysmal". The Geek was called "a boring, barely-even-an-hour mess of ugly STD '70s fucking and bad monster costumes" by The Liberal Dead.

In a review of fellow horror-porn hybrid Slaughter Disc, Digital Retribution referred to The Geek as "my favorite of this type of film".

== See also ==
- List of American films of 1971
