= Valley of the Sasquatch =

- Film poster
- Directed by: John Portanova
- Written by: John Portanova
- Produced by: Matt Medisch; Brent Stiefel
- Starring: Miles Joris-Peyrafitte; Jason Vail; David Saucedo; D'Angelo Midili; Bill Oberst Jr.
- Cinematography: Jeremy Berg
- Edited by: David Phillips
- Music by: Jon Bash
- Production companies: The October People; Votiv Films
- Release date: February 20, 2015 (NFF)
- Running time: 91 minutes
- Country: United States
- Language: English

Valley of the Sasquatch (also known as Hunting Grounds) is a 2015 American horror film written and directed by John Portanova and starring Miles Joris-Peyrafitte, Jason Vail, David Saucedo, D'Angelo Midili, and Bill Oberst Jr. as a group of hunters who encounter a family of Sasquatches. It premiered in February 2015 at the Nevermore Film Festival.

== Plot ==
After his wife dies, Roger forces his son Michael to go on a hunting trip in rural Washington. When they reach their cabin, they find it has been broken into and is a mess. They clean it up and are visited by family friend Sergio and Roger's brother-in-law Will. Tensions rise as neither Michael nor Will get along with Sergio, but they nevertheless decide to go hunting the next day.

During the hunting trip, Sergio stumbles upon some blood and unrecognizable body parts and is visibly distraught. The group later hear a strange howling, which Sergio speculates comes from a bear, even though Roger insists there are no bears living on that mountain.

While relieving himself, Sergio is charged by an unseen creature and manages to shoot it, although no trace of it can be found. Sergio is even further aggravated and suggest they return to the cabin, but Roger decides they should set up a camp for the night. As they walk away, a creature steps out on the path and observes them.

Much to Michael's dismay, they have no tents to sleep in, but Roger tells him they'll be safe regardless. While discussing today's events, Sergio realizes that the creature he saw must be a Sasquatch. Roger belittles him for his theory, but Will tells a story of a group of people who were attacked by unseen creatures while visiting their cabin in the area almost a century earlier.

Michael wakes up in the middle of the night when a group of Sasquatches are rummaging through the camp. Sergio and Roger open fire on them and the creatures disappear into the night. The group pursue them, only for Roger to be taken. Sergio, Will and Michael run back to the cabin while being pursued by the creatures. While discussing their options, Will and Sergio get in an altercation and Will is stabbed to death. Fearing for his safety, Michael knocks Sergio out.

A while later, a stranger comes knocking on the door and Michael lets him in. The stranger, who introduces himself as Bauman, tells of how he a few days earlier went up the mountain in search of a gold mine, at which point he was abducted by the Sasquatches. For reasons unknown to Bauman, the creatures kept him alive in their cave, and he was eventually able to make his escape after killing one of them. This causes Michael to speculate that Roger, too, is being kept alive and insists they go find him.

Guided by Bauman, Michael finds the cave and Roger, still alive, albeit with a broken leg. They retreat back to the cabin, but are assaulted by two Sasquatches. Bauman is killed by one of them, and Michael and Roger enlist the help of Sergio to keep them at bay. Eventually, though, Roger sacrifices Sergio to the creatures to give him and Michael time to get to their truck.

On the way to the truck, the creatures catch up with them, but Roger is able to kill one of them. Enraged by this, the last remaining Sasquatch moves to kill Roger, only to be stopped by Michael pointing Roger's gun at it. Michael, however, decides to spare the creature's life and it lets them leave before walking off into the woods.

== Cast ==
- Miles Joris-Peyrafitte as Michael Crew
- Jason Vail as Roger Crew
- David Saucedo as Sergio Guerrero
- D'Angelo Midili as Will Marx
- Bill Oberst Jr. as Bauman
- Connor Conrad as the beast

== Production ==
Valley of the Sasquatch is Portanova's debut. Portanova, a Washington native and Bigfoot fan, included local stories from Washington in the screenplay. Shooting took place entirely on location, including at Snoqualmie Pass and Meany Lodge, over 23 days. The monster suit was designed by Doug Hudson.

== Release ==
Valley of the Sasquatch premiered on February 20, 2015, at the Nevermore Film Festival.

=== Critical response ===
Ken W. Hanley of Fangoria rated it 2/4 stars and, though he praised Portanova's skill at directing and Hudson's special effects, wrote the writing is too generic. Mark L. Miller of Ain't It Cool News wrote the film fulfills all the criteria necessary for a good Bigfoot film: a new story, good action scenes, and a good costume. Ari Drew of Dread Central rated it 2.5/5 stars and wrote, "While Valley of the Sasquatch does not necessarily bring on the horror in a major or fresh way, it is at times a very effectively atmospheric film with some interesting ideas behind it." Michael Juvinall of Horror Society rated 4.5/5 stars and called it "the best this subgenre has to offer".

Mike Wilson of Bloody Disgusting gave the film a mixed review, writing, " Portanova certainly knows his way around with the camera, and the actors, for the most part, gave the effort necessary. The film just falters at attempting to mix a human drama with Bigfoot, being let down by the writing. Rough as it is, it’s still worthwhile to see it if you’re a fan of Bigfoot films, and you temper your expectations."
