= Curse of Bigfoot =

- DVD cover
- Directed by: Don Fields
- Written by: J.T. Fields
- Produced by: Don Fields
- Starring: Bob Clymire; Jan Swihart
- Release date: 1975
- Running time: 88 minutes
- Country: United States
- Language: English

Curse of Bigfoot is a 1975 American horror television film produced and directed by Dave Flocker (credited as Don Fields), and written by James T. Flocker (credited as J.T. Fields).

== Plot summary ==
A high school biology class receives a visitor, who is a good friend of their teacher. He tells them of an encounter that he and their teacher had 15 years before while searching for Indian artifacts in the nearby mountains. They find a mummified corpse in a cave that resembles a rough-hewn statue. The mummy is brought back to their lodge and breaks out of its wrappings. It goes on a short rampage in what appears to be an orchard. The humans gather together to stop the creature before it can kill anyone.

== Cast ==
- Bob Clymire as Johnny
- Jan Swihart as Sharon
- Bill Simonsen as Dr. Bill Wyman
- Dennis Kottmeier
- Ruth Ann Mannella as Linda
- Ken Kloepfer as Norman
- Mary Brownless

== Production ==
Curse of Bigfoot is an expanded version of a 1963 film made by the same director and writer which was only released in their home town, and was later titled Teenagers Battle the Thing for a video release in the '90s. Two teenagers from the original appear as adults in the opening scene of the 1976 film. The rest of Curse of Bigfoot consists of the entire 1963 film seen as a flashback. The original film focused on the resurrection of a prehistoric monster and had nothing to do with Bigfoot.

== DVD release ==
The film was released on DVD on 8 July 2008.

On 16 April 2012, Curse of Bigfoot was released as a VOD title by RiffTrax.
