= 9298 Geake =

Asteroid

Discovery
- Discovered by: E. Bowell
- Discovery site: Anderson Mesa Stn.
- Discovery date: 15 May 1985

Designations
- Named after: John E. Geake (British astronomer)
- Alternative designations: 1985 JM · 1994 VN_{2}
- Minor planet category: main-belt · (middle); Mitidika

Orbital characteristics
- Epoch 4 September 2017 (JD 2458000.5)
- Uncertainty parameter 0
- Observation arc: 60.89 yr (22,241 days)
- Aphelion: 3.3406 AU
- Perihelion: 1.8041 AU
- Semi-major axis: 2.5724 AU
- Eccentricity: 0.2987
- Orbital period (sidereal): 4.13 yr (1,507 days)
- Mean anomaly: 240.52°
- Mean motion: 0° 14^{m} 20.04^{s} / day
- Inclination: 12.113°
- Longitude of ascending node: 211.83°
- Argument of perihelion: 120.10°

Physical characteristics
- Dimensions: 6.50 km (calculated); 11.54±0.27 km 11.73±3.10 km 12.40±4.66 km 12.68±4.23 km 14.040±0.983 km
- Synodic rotation period: 38.29±0.02 h (Note: Lightcurve plot of 9298 Geake with a rotation period 38.29±0.02 hours with a brightness amplitude of 0.78±0.03 by B. D. Warner at the Palmer Divide Observatory (2006). Summary figures at LCDB)
- Geometric albedo: 0.033±0.008; 0.049±0.002; 0.05±0.02; 0.050±0.026; 0.05±0.06; 0.20 (assumed)
- Spectral type: S (assumed)
- Absolute magnitude (H): 13.20 · 13.3 · 13.36 · 13.42 · 13.59±1.39 · 13.6

9298 Geake, provisional designation 1985 JM, is a Mitidika asteroid from the central regions of the asteroid belt, approximately 12 kilometers in diameter. It was discovered on 15 May 1985, by American astronomer Edward Bowell at Lowell Observatory's Anderson Mesa Station near Flagstaff, Arizona, United States. The asteroid was named for British astronomer John E. Geake.

== Orbit and classification ==
Geake has been identified as a member of the Mitidika family, a dispersed asteroid family of carbonaceous C-type asteroids. The family is named after 2262 Mitidika (diameter of 9 km) and consists of 653 known members, the largest ones being 404 Arsinoë (95 km) and 5079 Brubeck (17 km). (Note: While the members of the Mitidika family have been characterized by Nesvorný (2014) as carbonaceous C-type asteroids with low albedos around 0.06, the family's namesake, 2262 Mitidika, is a much more reflective body with a measured albedo of 0.208, typically associated with stony S-type asteroids.)

The asteroid orbits the Sun in the central main-belt at a distance of 1.8–3.3 AU once every 4 years and 2 months (1,507 days). Its orbit has an eccentricity of 0.30 and an inclination of 12° with respect to the ecliptic. It was first observed on a precovery taken at Palomar Observatory in May 1956, extending the body's observation arc by 29 years prior to its official discovery observation at Anderson Mesa.

== Physical characteristics ==
=== Lightcurves ===
In August 2006, a rotational lightcurve of Geake was obtained from photometric observations by American astronomer Brian Warner at his Palmer Divide Observatory (716) in Colorado. Lightcurve analysis gave a rotation period of 38.29 hours with a brightness variation of 0.78 magnitude (U=2). While not being a slow rotator, it has a longer than average rotation, which lies normally between 2 and 20 hours. The body's high brightness amplitude of 0.78 magnitude also indicates that it has a non-spheroidal shape.

=== Diameter and albedo ===
According to the surveys carried out by the Japanese Akari satellite and NASA's Wide-field Infrared Survey Explorer with its subsequent NEOWISE mission, Geake measures between 11.54 and 14.040 kilometers in diameter and its surface has a low albedo between 0.033 and 0.05.

Contrary to the results obtained by the space-based observatories, the Collaborative Asteroid Lightcurve Link assumes a standard albedo for stony asteroids of 0.20, derived from the family's namesake, and consequently calculates a much shorter diameter of 6.50 kilometers based on an absolute magnitude of 13.3, as the higher a body's reflectivity the smaller its diameter for a given brightness.

== Naming ==
This minor planet was named after British astronomer John E. Geake (1925–1998), who invented the direct-reading linear refractometer, which was used by the Cassini–Huygens space probe. The official naming citation was published by the Minor Planet Center on 26 July 2000 (M.P.C. 41029).
