= John E. Geake =

British astronomer

- Born: John Edward Geake; 22 April 1925; Manchester, England
- Died: 3 June 1998 (aged 73); Daventry, Northamptonshire, England
- Education: UMIST
- Known for: Selenography, designing refractometers
- Scientific career
- Fields: Astronomy
- Workplaces: UMIST; NASA

John Edward Geake (22 April 1925 – 3 June 1998) was a British astronomer, noted as a lunar scientist and scientific instrument designer.

== Career ==
John Edward Geake was born on 22 April 1925 in Manchester, England. His postgraduate studies at the University of Manchester Institute of Science and Technology (UMIST) related to the study of astronomical spectra using a photoelectric photometer. His work parallelled that of W. Albert Hiltner's team in the United States; although at the time neither knew of the other's work, and their methods were different. This research, which was long before the days of space exploration, led to laboratory measurement of luminescence from meteorite samples, which could be compared with lunar luminescence in an attempt to determine the composition of the lunar surface. His expertise was recognised by both the American and the Soviet space agencies, both of whom allocated to him lunar samples for study.

He was a NASA principal investigator, and an editor of Lunar Science Conference Proceedings. One of his focuses was in trying to gain information from the polarization of light scattered from the surfaces of solid bodies in the Solar System. This involved comparison of laboratory measurements on samples of known characteristics against astronomical observations. This led to analysis of data collected by the Pioneer 10 and Pioneer 11 spacecraft, targeted at Jupiter and Saturn. He became well known for this work, which was continued after his death by Tom Gehrels of the University of Arizona; where Geake had held the post of adjunct professor. Geake was also a fellow at the Royal Astronomical Society, and a member of the International Astronomical Union.

=== Refractometer inventions ===
Geake invented the first linear direct-reading refractometer for liquids, which has since been used in many practical applications. He designed the "UMIST Refractometer" subsystem for the Cassini–Huygens probe, which reached Saturn's moon Titan after his death in 2004. He also invented a spectral differentiating refractometer.

== Retirement and death ==
Geake died on 3 June 1998 after retiring in 1992 with the title of reader. He had worked in UMIST physics department for 35 years, where he made major contributions including the founding of the Industrial Science Group, one of the earliest university-industry liaison groups.

== Personal life ==
In his private life, Geake was a devout member of Fourth Church of Christ, Scientist, Manchester, and a visiting chaplain at Strangeways Prison. He had two daughters with his wife, Mary. The archaeologist Helen Geake is his cousin.

== Honours ==
The main-belt asteroid 9298 Geake, discovered by Edward Bowell at Anderson Mesa Station in 1985, was named in his honour.
