= Jacaranda Joe =

- Directed by: George A. Romero
- Written by: George A. Romero
- Release date: 1994
- Running time: 17 minutes
- Country: United States
- Language: English

Jacaranda Joe is a 1994 American short film written and directed by George A. Romero.

== Production ==
Initially conceived in the 1970s as The Footage, the film was about a reality television show in which a famous athlete learns to hunt and accidentally discovers a community of bigfoot.

That version of the story would be about the filming of the television show whereas the retooled version that became Jacaranda Joe was a "proto-found footage movie" in documentary style which would feature a leaked clip from a television show similar to the one from The Footage.

Filmed at Valencia College in Florida over ten days it had a cast and crew of students, faculty, and local industry professionals. It was the first film that Romero shot entirely outside of Pittsburgh.

The short film has never been publicly screened although a VHS copy of the workprint exists as well as six reels of camera negatives.
