= Proof (comics) =

2007–2010 comic book series

- Cover of the first issue.

Publication information
- Publisher: Image Comics
- Schedule: Monthly
- Format: Ongoing series
- Genre: Horror
- Publication date: October 2007 – 2010
- No. of issues: 28
- Main character: John Prufrock

Creative team
- Created by: Alex Grecian, Riley Rossmo
- Written by: Alex Grecian
- Artist: Riley Rossmo
- Letterer: Alex Grecian
- Colorist(s): Tyler Jenkins (#1-5); Fiona Staples (#6-8); Adam Guzowski (#9-16); Dave Casey (#18-28)

Collected editions
- Goatsucker: ISBN 1-58240-994-3
- The Company Of Men: ISBN 1607060175
- Thunderbirds Are Go!: ISBN 1607061341
- Julia: ISBN 1607062852
- Blue Fairies: ISBN 1607063484

Proof is an American comic book series, published by Image Comics and created by writer Alex Grecian and artist Riley Rossmo. The story concerns John "Proof" Prufrock, a sasquatch, who works for a secret government organization. He hunts cryptids with his partner, Ginger Brown, and seeks clues to his past. The book was influenced by The X-Files and Tarzan.

The first issue was released on October 24, 2007. Besides individual issues and trade paperbacks, Proof is also available on the iPhone and iPod Touch.

== Publication history ==
The character of Proof first appeared in "Berserker", a short story published in Negative Burn #7 (December 2006). The black-and-white story, also created by Alex Grecian and Riley Rossmo, shows Proof's battle with a skin-walker.

Besides his own title, Proof appeared in 2008's Image Monster Pile-Up, a one-shot anthology comic that also featured The Astounding Wolf-Man, The Perhapanauts, and Firebreather.

== Plot ==
The first arc, "Goatsucker", concerns a cryptid attack in Minnesota that appears to be the work of a Bigfoot-like creature. The plot also details the transfer of Ginger Brown, a young female agent, from the F.B.I to a secret organization called The Lodge. Once employed, Brown discovers that her partner is John "Proof" Prufrock, a Bigfoot who works in secret for the U.S. government. Brown's first case with The Lodge concerns El Chupacabra, a monster who masquerades as a human by wearing the skin of its victims. Ginger and Proof also encounter a number of cryptozoological fauna, including jackalopes, a golem, and the Cottingley Fairies.

The second arc, "The Company of Men", follows Proof as he attempts to save a juvenile dinosaur from poachers in the Congo. The third arc is called "Thunderbirds Are Go!" and features dual main plots: Ginger and Elvis journey to New York City to find Joe the golem, while Proof investigates sightings of condorlike thunderbirds in rural Illinois. "Thunderbirds Are Go!" guest-stars The Savage Dragon, another Image Comics character. The fourth arc, "Julia", is set in the mid-19th century. The story delves into Proof's past with his so-called "brother" Mi-Chen Po, and the plot is loosely based on the history of Julia Pastrana. The fifth and final collection of the series entitled "Blue Fairies" gives readers a look at the maturation of male fairies, provides a brief look at the future of The Lodge, and concludes with the story "Who Killed the Dover Demon?" The final arc of the series sets the stage for the return of the character in a series of mini-series, the first of which is called Proof: Endangered.

== Characters ==
- Proof: John Prufrock is a Bigfoot who works for The Lodge, a secret organization located in Washington. As a Bigfoot, he is vastly larger and more powerful than a human being. Proof is exceptionally cultured for a feral beast; he is often seen wearing expensive suits and custom-made shoes.
- Ginger Brown: A young FBI agent, Brown is transferred to The Lodge after a fateful encounter with a golem in New York City. She is young and brash, and does not know what to make of Proof, who is her new partner.
- Leander Wight: The aged and wise manager of The Lodge. He is kindly, but mysterious.
- Elvis Aaron Chesnut: A small-town sheriff who ends up joining The Lodge during the "Goatsucker" arc.
- Wayne Russet: The gameskeeper of The Lodge. Wayne is Proof's best friend, and a surrogate 'mother' to many of the cryptids of The Lodge.
- Autumn Song: The hard-hearted assistant to Wayne.
- Mi-Chen Po: A mysterious yeti who has plans for Proof and Ginger.
- Colonel Werner Dachshund: A villainous poacher who kills and devours cryptids.

== Cryptids ==
Many fanciful creatures inhabit the world of Proof. While most harmlessly occupy the free-range habitat of The Lodge, several hostile cryptids run free in the wild and must be captured. These captures drive Proof's main plot:

- Joe: An apparent golem living in New York City, Joe defends the city's Jewish population.
- The Dover Demon: An enigmatic and gangly creature, the Demon can foretell the future.
- Nadine: Also known as El Chupacabra or The Mexican Bigfoot, Nadine skins humans and wears their skins as a disguise.
- Passenger pigeons: Birds, long thought extinct, which live in seclusion in The Lodge's habitat.
- Dodos: The last of their species, the friendly dodos live in The Lodge.
- Jackalopes: These horned rabbits are kept with the dodos.
- The Cottingley Fairies: Vicious beasts that resemble small winged women, they are kept behind glass for the safety of the staff. Three male fairies (gigantic in size) are kept in seclusion.
- Gnomes: Tiny, meat-eating creatures that resemble senior citizens.
- Brownies: Hairy little creatures with hostile intent.
- Mokele-mbembe: Apatosaurus-like dinosaurs that live harmlessly in The Congo.
- Thunderbirds: Gigantic, vulturelike birds that are capable of snatching children.

== Collected editions ==
The series has been collected into trade paperback:

- Goatsucker (collects Proof #1-5, 128 pages, June 2008, ISBN 1-58240-994-3)
- The Company Of Men (collects Proof #6-9, 128 pages, December 2008, ISBN 1-60706-017-5)
- Thunderbirds Are Go! (collects Proof #10-16, 144 pages, July 2009, ISBN 1-60706-134-1)
- Julia (collects Proof #18-23, 128 pages, July 2010, ISBN 1-60706-285-2)
- Blue Fairies (collects Proof #24-28, 128 pages, December 28, 2010, ISBN 1-60706-348-4)
- Endangered (collects Proof: Endangered #1-5, 128 pages, December 28, 2011, ISBN 978-1-60706-391-9)
- Proof Compendium (collects Proof #1-28 and Proof: Endangered #1-5, Image Comics, 800 pages, August 2025, ISBN 978-15343-453-62)
