= Evenfall =

- Directed by: Keith Jodoin
- Written by: Keith Jodoin
- Release date: 2005

Evenfall is the first short film in a series produced by Sapling Pictures. This chapter is about a highly trained young woman embarking on her career as an international spy and discovering it takes more than good looks to keep things from falling into the wrong hands.

== Plot ==
The serial adventure Evenfall narrates the journey of Eve, a young woman following in the footsteps of her fallen father. She's partnered with "Uncle," her father's former colleague and her surrogate father. Ben, a tech genius, rounds out the trio as they embark on clandestine missions for a private intelligence agency.

This chapter of Eve's adventures opens on a crowded ballroom during Eve's first field operation where she first encounters Miles Devlin, a charming but ruthless Englishman. Things take a turn for the worse when Miles wounds her and escapes. After she recovers and gains more field experience, Eve encounters Miles again, this time in Hong Kong. He aims to steal an ancient and valuable Chinese diary that Eve has acquired, but she is determined to keep it and settle the score.

As Eve and Miles struggle for possession of the diary, Uncle and Ben are in a London auction house poised to acquire a rare jade pendant. They must outbid Miles' employer, Mr. Durand, a French millionaire and collector who is determined to win the jade himself. Uncle assumes the alias of an antiquities dealer while Ben laces Mr. Durand's scotch with a sedative. But Mr. Durand's watchful attaché Simon Leduc becomes suspicious and tries to uncover Uncle's true identity.

What Eve and her colleagues don't yet realize is that securing these items will propel them on a journey that will reveal the mystery of her father's death.

== Cast ==
- Abby Sugrue as Eve
- Dave Coyne as Miles Devlin
- LeRoy London as Uncle
- Tel Monks as Mr. Durand
- Daniel Ross as Ben
- Eddy Chalitta As Simon Leduc

== Technical ==
Written and directed by Keith Jodoin, the 30-minute film was shot digitally in high-definition using the Sony HDW-F900 CineAlta camera. It was shot on-location around greater Washington, DC including the famous Mayflower Hotel in downtown Washington.

The film premiered in March 2005 at the Sedona International Film Festival in Sedona, Arizona and screened online as part of the AOL/moviefone Shorts Festival.

== Awards ==
Evenfall received an Audience Award at the 2005 DC Shorts International Film Festival.
