= Slaughter Disc =

- DVD released by Steel Web Studios
- Directed by: David Kwitmire
- Written by: David Kwitmire
- Produced by: David Kwitmire
- Starring: Caroline Pierce; Robert Williams
- Music by: Peter Gorritz
- Production company: Steel Web Studios
- Distributed by: Steel Web Studios
- Release dates: April 25, 2005 (Convergence Convention, United States)
- Running time: 90 minutes
- Country: United States
- Language: English
- Budget: $10,000

Slaughter Disc is a 2005 pornographic horror film written, directed and produced by David Kwitmire and starring Caroline Pierce and Robert Williams.

== Plot ==
Due to masturbating to Clown Porn, college student and sex addict Michael Brichums misses a date with his girlfriend, Carrie, prompting Carrie to dump him. Later, Mike goes to a sex shop, where he finds a magazine featuring Andromeda Strange, an alt porn star whose films are so extreme they have been banned in numerous countries. Mike asks the clerk about Andromeda, and is told that obscenity laws prohibit the store from selling her merchandise, but he can probably find her films online. When Mike leaves, the clerk disappears; an employee (who was in the washroom) emerges to find Mike's receipt and wonder "Who the hell rang this up?" implying that the "clerk" was not an actual shop employee.

At home, Mike orders one of Andromeda's DVDs, which is strangely transparent. The video depicts Andromeda masturbating until she bleeds, and cutting her own wrist and throat with a straight razor, something which greatly disturbs Mike. A few days later, Mike decides to give the film another shot, and views a scene in which a now scarred and demonic Andromeda performs fellatio on a bound and gagged man. After the man climaxes, Andromeda slits his throat. The next morning, Mike wakes up late for work, and as he rushes out the door, Andromeda appears on his television, and kisses the screen.

Because of frequent tardiness, Mike is fired from his job, and while watching more of Andromeda's video, he gets a call from his friend, John, asking him to hang out at a bar. Mike goes to the bar, leaving Andromeda to glare at him as he leaves. John does not show up at the bar and will not answer his phone, so Mike gets drunk alone, stumbles home, and vomits repeatedly. Unable to sleep, Mike pops in Andromeda's DVD, which now shows Andromeda with another bound and gagged man, who Mike is shocked to realize is John. Andromeda rapes John, bludgeons him with a hammer, and eats chunks of his brain matter. Mike believes what he saw was fake, until he is led to John's remains by images on his television, and a call from Andromeda.

Mike panics, and calls Carrie, and the police. Carrie does not believe Mike's story, and the 911 operator is doubtful as well, but promises Mike he will send a unit to his apartment. Back home, Mike's television is on, and is showing Andromeda molesting an unconscious Carrie, and slitting her throat. Mike destroys the DVD and unplugs the television, but it will not turn off. Andromeda then appears in the room, and seduces Mike, who asks "Do I have to die? I don't want this to end". Andromeda responds with "You're already dead" as it is revealed the two are on Mike's television, and Mike's mutilated body is lying on his couch. The officers called by Mike arrive at his apartment, but Mike's body is gone. Two detectives find Andromeda's DVD and magazine, and take them as evidence.

In a post-credits scene, a sex shop customer inquires about Andromeda. The clerk turns around, and is shown to be a gaunt Mike, who states "Oh yeah, Andromeda Strange. Yeah, she's hot as hell alright. She's definitely capable of pulling some weird and crazy shit. But hey, I've got to warn you about something... her video is definitely not for the weak hearted."

== Cast ==
- Robert Williams as Michael Brichums
- Jewels MacKenzie as Carrie
- Kristen Quitmeyer as Neighbor
- Travis Lee as John
- Gabe Messer as Pete
- Ashley Rees as Vicky
- Chris Spoto as Delivery Guy
- Caroline Pierce as Andromeda Strange
- Albin Kinsey as Naked Man
- David Kwitmire as Sam Langley/Customer
- Pete Arnold as Police Officer
- Kreg Kearley as Detective #1
- Roger Gobin as Detective #2

== Reception ==
Adult Video News gave Slaughter Disc a four out of five, though went on to write "this really is not a good movie" and "the most disturbing thing about it is that it contains a very definite anti-porn message". The same score was awarded by Digital Retribution, which said "it is the first movie I've seen that successfully merged horror with porn without becoming a farce or just awful". A grade of two was given by The Video Graveyard, which found the story interesting (if not explored as well as it could be) and stated "Even though the film has failed in the same area as others of its type, I have to admit that Slaughter Disc did manage to elicit a fair amount of suspense and had me wanting to know what was going to happen".

The Worldwide Celluloid Massacre called Slaughter Disc a dull and uninteresting film that was non-erotic porn and non-scary horror with mostly weak gore. The film was also heavily criticized by Soiled Sinema, which called it a boring and unarousing mess with poor image and sound quality, ultimately concluding "The horror world is already polluted with a dung heap of horrendous trash. Slaughter Disc is just another bag of garbage for the already putrid pile".
