= Alex Grecian =

American writer

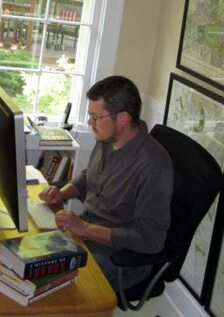
- Grecian in 2012
- Born: Alexander Douglas Grecian; August 6, 1969 (age 57); Kansas, United States
- Education: University of Kansas
- Occupations: Novelist; short story writer; comic book writer
- Spouse: Christy Grecian
- Children: Graham Grecian
- Writing career
- Genres: Mystery fiction, Historical fiction
- Website: alexgrecian.com

Alex Grecian (/ˈɡriːʃən/; born Alexander Douglas Grecian on August 6, 1969) is an American author of short fiction, novels, comic books, and graphic novels. His notable works include the comic book series Proof and the novels in the Scotland Yard's Murder Squad series: The Yard, The Black Country, The Devil's Workshop, The Harvest Man, Lost and Gone Forever, and The Blue Girl. He has been nominated for the Strand Award for Best Debut Novel for The Yard, The Dilys Award for The Black Country, and the Barry Award for Best First Novel for The Yard. He was also the recipient of an Inkpot Award in 2018 and of the Kansas Notable Book Awards from the State Library of Kansas for The Yard, The Black Country, The Devil's Workshop, Lost and Gone Forever, and Red Rabbit.

== Career ==
=== Literary influences ===
As a child and a teenager, Grecian read the works of C. S. Lewis, Charles Dickens, Lewis Carroll, and Edgar Allan Poe. He later became a fan of crime fiction, reading the works of authors as diverse as Graham Greene, Donald E. Westlake, Ross Macdonald, and John D. MacDonald. Other influences include John Irving, Kurt Vonnegut, Michael Chabon, and Stephen King.

=== Comics and graphic novels ===
Grecian's first comic book work, released in 2006, was a collaboration with Canadian comic book artist and illustrator Riley Rossmo on Seven Sons, a graphic novel based on the anonymously written Chinese folktale Ten Brothers known to be written around the time of the Ming Dynasty (1368 to 1644). In 2007, he started work on Proof, also with Riley Rossmo. NPR named this series one of the best books of 2009. Grecian and Rossmo started on their third project together, Rasputin, in the fall of 2014. This series is a work of fiction based on the life of Grigori Rasputin. Rasputin was a mystical adviser in the court of Czar Nicholas II of Russia in the early nineteen hundreds.

In 2013, with fellow creators B. Clay Moore, Jeremy Haun, and Seth Peck, Grecian developed the anthology Bad Karma using a Kickstarter campaign. Bad Karma is a hardcover comics, prose and art collection featuring five separate, inter-related creator-owned concepts.

=== Novels ===
In May 2012 Grecian's debut novel The Yard was released by G. P. Putnam's Sons. This novel is the first in the Murder Squad Series. The second novel in the series, The Black Country, was released in May 2013, then the third, The Devil's Workshop in May 2014, the fourth, The Harvest Man in May 2015, and the fifth, Lost and Gone Forever in May 2016. The e-book The Blue Girl is also a story of the Murder Squad and was released in June 2013. In April 2018 Grecian released the stand-alone book The Saint of Wolves and Butchers also published by G. P. Putnam's Sons. In September 2023, Grecian released the novel Red Rabbit, published by Tor Books. The stand-alone sequel, Rose of Jericho, will be released in March 2025 also by Tor Books.

== Bibliography ==
=== AiT/Planet Lar ===
- Seven Sons (AiT/Planet Lar, 88 pages, 2006, ISBN 1-932051-46-5)

=== Image Comics ===
- Proof Book 1: Goatsucker (collects Proof #1-5, Image Comics, 128 pages, June 2008, ISBN 978-1-58240-944-3)
- Proof Book 2: The Company Of Men (collects Proof #6-9, Image Comics, 128 pages, December 2008, ISBN 1-60706-017-5)
- Proof Book 3: Thunderbirds Are Go! (collects Proof #10-16, Image Comics, 144 pages, July 2009, ISBN 1-60706-134-1)
- Proof Book 4: Julia (collects Proof #18-23, Image Comics, 128 pages, July 2010, ISBN 1-60706-285-2)
- Proof Book 5: Blue Fairies (collects Proof #24-28, Image Comics, 128 pages, December 2010, ISBN 1-60706-348-4)
- Proof Book 6: Endangered (collects Proof: Endangered #1-5, Image Comics, 128 pages, December 28, 2011, ISBN 978-1-60706-391-9)
- Fractured Fables (Image Comics, 160 pages, July 2010, ISBN 978-1-60706-269-1)
- Dia de Los Muertos (collects #1-3, Image Comics, tpb, 128 pages, November 2013, ISBN 978-1-60706-807-5)
- Rasputin Volume 1 (collects Rasputin #1-5, Image Comics, 184 pages, May 2015, ISBN 1-63215-267-3)
- Rasputin Volume 2 (collects Rasputin #6-10, Image Comics, 136 pages, February 2016, ISBN 1-63215-633-4)
- Proof Compendium (collects Proof #1-28 and Proof: Endangered #1-5, Image Comics, 800 pages, August 2025, ISBN 978-15343-453-62)

=== Vertigo (DC Comics) ===
- The Unexpected (Vertigo (DC Comics), tpb, 160 pages, 2013, ISBN 978-1-4012-4394-4)

=== G. P. Putnam's Sons ===
- The Yard (G. P. Putnam's Sons, May 2012, ISBN 0-42526-127-1, 978-0-39914-954-2)
- The Black Country (G. P. Putnam's Sons, May 2013, ISBN 0-42526-773-3)
- The Blue Girl (G. P. Putnam's Sons, June 2013, ASIN B00B1FG9DA)
- The Devil's Workshop (G. P. Putnam's Sons, May 2014, ISBN 0-39916-643-2)
- The Harvest Man (G. P. Putnam's Sons, May 2015, ISBN 0-39916-644-0)
- Lost and Gone Forever (G. P. Putnam's Sons, May 2016, ISBN 0-39917-610-1)
- The Saint of Wolves and Butchers (G. P. Putnam's Sons, April 2018, ISBN 0-39917-611-X)

=== Ellery Queen's Mystery Magazine ===
- "Unknown Caller" (Ellery Queen's Mystery Magazine, July 2014)
- "The Scarlet Box" (Ellery Queen's Mystery Magazine, January/February 2022)

=== TKO Studios ===
- One Eye Open (TKO Studios, March 2022, ISBN 978-1-95220-329-9)

=== Reactor ===
- "The Price of Rye" (Reactor, September 2023)

=== Tor Books ===
- Red Rabbit (Tor Books, September 2023, ISBN 978-1-25087-468-9)
- Rose of Jericho (Tor Books, March 2025, ISBN 978-1-250-87471-9)

=== Bad Hand Books ===
- "Item G2V" in Long Division (Bad Hand Books, December 2024, ISBN 979-8-988-12867-0)
- "The Boatman" (Bad Hand Books, 2026)

== Selected awards and honors ==
- 2012 The New York Times Bestseller list for The Yard
- 2013 Barry Award (for crime novels) nomination for Best First Novel for The Yard
- 2013 Strand Magazine's Critic's Award nomination for Best Debut Novel for The Yard
- 2013 The Kansas Notable Book Awards List for The Yard
- 2014 Dilys Award nomination for Mystery Title of the Year for The Black Country
- 2014 The Kansas Notable Book Awards List for The Black Country
- 2015 The Kansas Notable Book Awards List for The Devil's Workshop
- 2017 The Kansas Notable Book Awards List for Lost and Gone Forever
- 2018 Inkpot Award for The Saint of Wolves and Butchers
- 2024 The Kansas Notable Book Awards List for Red Rabbit
- 2024 The MPLA Literary Contribution Award for significance to the library community
- 2025 USA Today Bestseller list for Rose of Jerico
