= Finding Bigfoot =

Animal Planet TV series

- Genre: Reality documentary
- Starring: Cliff Barackman; James "Bobo" Fay; Ranae Holland; Matt Moneymaker
- Narrated by: Ken Scott; Matt Moneymaker
- Theme music composer: Raney Schocke
- Opening theme: Roaring Sasquatch
- Country of origin: United States
- Original language: English
- No. of seasons: 9
- No. of episodes: 100 (list of episodes)

Production
- Executive producers: Keith Hoffman; Brad Kuhlman & Casey Brumels
- Running time: 40–84 minutes
- Production company: Ping Pong Productions

Original release
- Network: Animal Planet
- Release: May 29, 2011 – May 27, 2018

Finding Bigfoot was an American reality television series on Animal Planet that follows a team of four researchers investigating potential evidence for Bigfoot, a human or ape-like mythical creature alleged by some to inhabit the North American wilderness. Despite the team never capturing conclusive evidence for Bigfoot's existence and mixed reviews from critics, the show gained high ratings and was a top earner for Animal Planet. It premiered on May 29, 2011, and the series finale and 100th episode was released on May 27, 2018; one special episode released in 2021.

== Premise ==
The team consists of Bigfoot Field Researchers Organization (BFRO) founder and president Matt Moneymaker, Bigfoot enthusiasts and researchers James "Bobo" Fay and Cliff Barackman, and skeptical scientist Ranae Holland. The series never questions the existence of Bigfoot, but rather documents the team's futile search efforts and study of potential evidence in an attempt to prove the existence of the cryptid.

The series introduced new Bigfoot-related terms into popular culture. For example, the term "Squatch" (short for Sasquatch, another commonly used name for Bigfoot). Their investigations are referred to as "Squatching" or "Squatch'n". The areas they investigate are often described as "Squatchy", with Washington state having been described as the "Squatchiest state" by some members of the team.

== Cast ==
- Matt Moneymaker:

Moneymaker is the founder and president of the Bigfoot Field Researchers Organization (founded in 1995). Moneymaker was born and raised in Los Angeles, California, and moved to Ohio in the 2000s. He has been researching Bigfoot for 30 years.

- Cliff Barackman:

Born and raised in Long Beach, California, Barackman currently resides in Portland, Oregon. The evidence analyst of the group has been a field researcher for the past two decades, known to spend over 200 days a year in the field. He is also a jazz guitarist holding a Bachelor of Arts degree from California State University, Long Beach.

- James "Bobo" Fay:

The field caller was born and raised in Manhattan Beach, California, and has been interested in Bigfoot since the 1980s. The tallest and burliest member of the team, he is the one most often used to stand in for Bigfoot in reconstructions. Fay is known for his "Gone Squatch'n" hat, and often wears other Bigfoot-related attire. He and Barackman are close friends and searched for Bigfoot together before the series started. On November 13, 2012, Fay appeared on episode 332 of Conan. In 2014, Boston Red Sox second baseman Dustin Pedroia met Fay at Fenway Park before a game and gave him an autographed baseball bat with a Sasquatch logo on the bottom of it. Fay appears in the 1986 music video for the Kenny Loggins song Playing with the Boys.

- Ranae Holland:

The skeptical member of the cast is a field biologist born and raised in Sioux Falls, South Dakota. While she is not a member of the BFRO, and does not believe in Bigfoot, her interest in the creature was fueled by her father's fascination with the phenomenon. As a child, she and her father spent quality time together "Squatching" and watching Bigfoot movies.

== Episodes ==
An episode often begins with the Finding Bigfoot team driving to a location on the trail of photographic, video, audio, or eyewitness evidence of a Bigfoot. The team will go to the location where the evidence was gathered, and speak to the person who gathered the evidence. If it is a photograph or a video, the team will perform a re-creation and a size comparison of the event, using the same camera that the witness used. The team then performs their first night investigation at that same location.

Starting with the second season, one member of the team will almost always remain at the location for a solo night investigation for several more nights. The other members will then head to a 'town hall meeting' to which members of the public are invited to come and share their Bigfoot encounter stories. In some heavily Bigfoot reported areas, such as Washington, these events are sometimes invite only.

After the witnesses tell their encounter stories, they are asked to mark their sighting locations on a map, which the team then uses to look for a pattern of sightings. The team will then visit three of the best-reported encounters, that are usually close to one another. After visiting all three witnesses, the team will collect the member who was doing the solo night investigation and select an area to do their final night investigation.

For the final night investigation, the team usually devises a unique plan to try to attract a Bigfoot, usually involving noise or light, by using boats on a lake, or silent electric ATVs. They also do "wood knocks" or howls, which is believed to mimic a Bigfoot's communication. Night-vision technology and forward looking infrared (FLIR) cameras are used to document these investigations. They will then evaluate what they learned and announce their evaluations during the ending credits. Occasionally, they will show their trail cam pictures or DNA results following the credits/summary.

In the third season, the team expanded their search to investigate other Bigfoot-like creatures such as the Yowie in Australia, Orang Pendek in Indonesia, and the Wildman in Vietnam. In season four, the team traveled to China in search of the Yeren and Nepal in search of the Yeti. In later seasons, the team traveled to other countries, including the United Kingdom and Brazil.

On October 20, 2017, the Finding Bigfoot cast and crew revisited California to attend the 50th anniversary festival of the Patterson-Gimlin film while filming the 100th and finale episode of the show. It aired on May 27, 2018 and was titled "Return of the Legend".

On February 8, 2021, the series returned for a two-hour special entitled "Finding Bigfoot: The Search Continues." The special features the return of all four original cast members and focuses on utilizing new technologies. It was made available exclusively for the streaming service Discovery+. The special aired on Animal Planet for the first time on September 6, 2021.

Season	Episodes	Originally released	
Season	Episodes	First released	Last released
1	7	May 30, 2011	July 17, 2011
2	11	October 30, 2011	March 11, 2012
3	23	November 11, 2012	March 31, 2013
4	14	November 10, 2013	February 16, 2014
5	8	June 8, 2014	July 27, 2014
6	10	November 9, 2014	January 25, 2015
7	8	May 31, 2015	July 12, 2015
8	8	January 3, 2016	April 14, 2016
9	9	January 8, 2017	February 26, 2017

== Reception ==
Animal Planet received criticism for Finding Bigfoot and Mermaids: The Body Found for their "outlandishness”. Fay defended Finding Bigfoot, and drew a line between the two programs. "You can't equate bigfoot with mermaids."

Several episodes of the first season received heavy criticism from the four 'Finding Bigfoot' members themselves, for the editing style that Animal Planet used, to make it appear that a horse and a person were unidentified by the team, and what they were remained unknown. The second event, involving the horse, led the team to threaten to quit the show if such techniques were used again.

Finding Bigfoot ranked among Animal Planet's top rated programs throughout its run. It has spawned two spin-offs: Finding Bigfoot: Further Evidence and Finding Bigfoot: Rejected Evidence. Finding Bigfoot: Further Evidence is similar to VH-1's Pop-Up Video. Episodes of Finding Bigfoot are re-aired with "info nuggets" from the team members. Finding Bigfoot: Rejected Evidence is an online-only series, in which executive producer Keith Hoffman airs video deemed not worthy of inclusion on the show.

Some Bigfoot enthusiasts have ridiculed the show due to the team's consistent lack of success, and the fact that any footage of a Bigfoot would be reported long before an episode airs.

== See also ==
- Bigfoot in popular culture
