= Kansas Notable Book Awards =

Annual literary awards

Kansas Notable Books
- Awarded for: Outstanding titles created by Kansans or about Kansas in the previous year
- Presented by: Kansas Center for the Book
- First award: 2006
- Website: Kansas Notable Books

The State of Kansas Notable Book Awards are presented annually for fifteen notable books created by writers, illustrators or book artists who are Kansans or have written about Kansas. The award, originally established in 2006, is organized by the Kansas Center for the Book (KCFB).

Winning authors include Clare Vanderpool, Rolf Potts, Ben Lerner, Candice Millard and Gordon Parks.

== Process ==
The KCFB is a state affiliate of the Center for the Book in the Library of Congress. It is a program of the State Library of Kansas.

A committee of KCFB affiliates and fellows, together with authors of previous Notable Books, identifies notable titles from among those published the previous year, and the State Librarian makes the selection for the final list of fifteen. A reception and medal awards ceremony are held to honor the books and their authors and illustrators.

== List of winners ==
The Kansas Notable Book Award winners are listed in descending order by year, then in alphabetical order by title:

=== 2025 ===
- Coco, Snow!, by Julie Mosiman and illustrated by Ellen Youngman
- Dress Me Like a Prizefighter, by Catherine Strayhall
- From the Reservation to Washington: The Rise of Charles Curtis, by Debra Goodrich
- In True Face: A woman's Life in the CIA, Unmasked, by Jonna Mendez
- Las Madres: Latinas in the Heartland Who Led Their Family to Success, by Dennis Raphael Garcia
- The Last Rancher, by Robert Rebein
- The Lies We Conjure, by Sarah Henning
- No Bullet Got Me Yet: The Relentless Faith of Father Kapaun, by John Stansifer
- Not the Worst Friend in the World, by Anne Rellihan
- Outdoor Farm, Indoor Farm, by Lindsay H. Metcalf, illustrated by Xin Li
- Remnants of a Scarlet Flame, by Cindy L. Sell
- The Rhino Keeper, by Jillian Forsberg
- The Switch Point, by A. D. Childers
- Treehouse Town, by Gideon Sterer, illustrated by Kansan, Charlie Mylie
- Wichita Blues: Music in the African American Community, by Patrick Joseph O'Connor

=== 2024 ===
- Abolitionist of the Most Dangerous Kind: James Montgomery and His War on Slavery, by Todd Mildfelt and David Schafer
- Daughter of Chaos, by Sarah Edgerton
- Doomed by Blooms, by Anna St. John
- Grief Said "Have a Seat", by Amanda G. Elsbury
- Henry, Like Always, by Jenn Bailey
- I've Been Fighting This War Within Myself, by Antonio Sanchez-Day and edited by Brian Daldorph
- Into the Sunset: Emmett Dalton and the End of the Dalton Gang, by Ian Shaw
- The Jayhawk: The Story of the University of Kansas's Beloved Mascot, by Rebecca Ozier Schulte
- Kansas City's Montgall Avenue: Black Leaders and the Street They Called Home, by Margie Carr
- Orion O'Brien and the Spirit of Quindaro, by Fran Borin
- Proclaiming the Good News: Mennonite Women's Voices, 1972-2006, by Lois Y. Barrett and Dorothy Nickel Friesen
- Red Rabbit, by Alex Grecian
- Roadside Geology of Kansas, by James S Aber, Susan E. W. Aber, and Michael J. Everhart
- We're Safe When We're Alone, by Nghiem Tran
- Without Warning: The Tornado of Udall, Kansas, by Jim Minick

=== 2023 ===
- Cabby Potts, Duchess of Dirt – Kathleen Wilford
- Easy Beauty: A Memoir – Chloé Cooper Jones
- Hell's Half-acre: The Untold Story of the Benders, America's First Serial Killer Family – Susan Jonusas
- Justa's Escape: A Journey from WWII Ukraine – Justina Neufeld with Russell Binkley
- Kansas Speaks Out: Poems in the Age of Me, Too – edited by Dennis Etzel, Jr and Jericho Hockett
- Letters to Martin: Meditations on Democracy – Randal Maurice Jelks
- The Monster's Bones: The Discovery of T. Rex and How It Shook Our World – David K. Randall
- Native American Stories for Kids: 12 Traditional Stories From Indigenous Tribes Across North America – T. F. Pecore Weso
- A New Guide to Kansas Mushrooms – Sherry Kay
- Nothing but the Dirt: Stories From An American Farm Town – Kate Guerriero Benz
- One Boy Watching – Grant Snider
- River of the Gods: Genius, Courage, and Betrayal in the Search for the Source of the Nile – Candice Millard
- The Undead Truth of Us – Britney S. Lewis
- The Vagabond's Way: 366 Meditations on Wanderlust, Discovery, and the Art of Travel – Rolf Potts
- Winfield's Walnut Valley Festival – Seth Bate

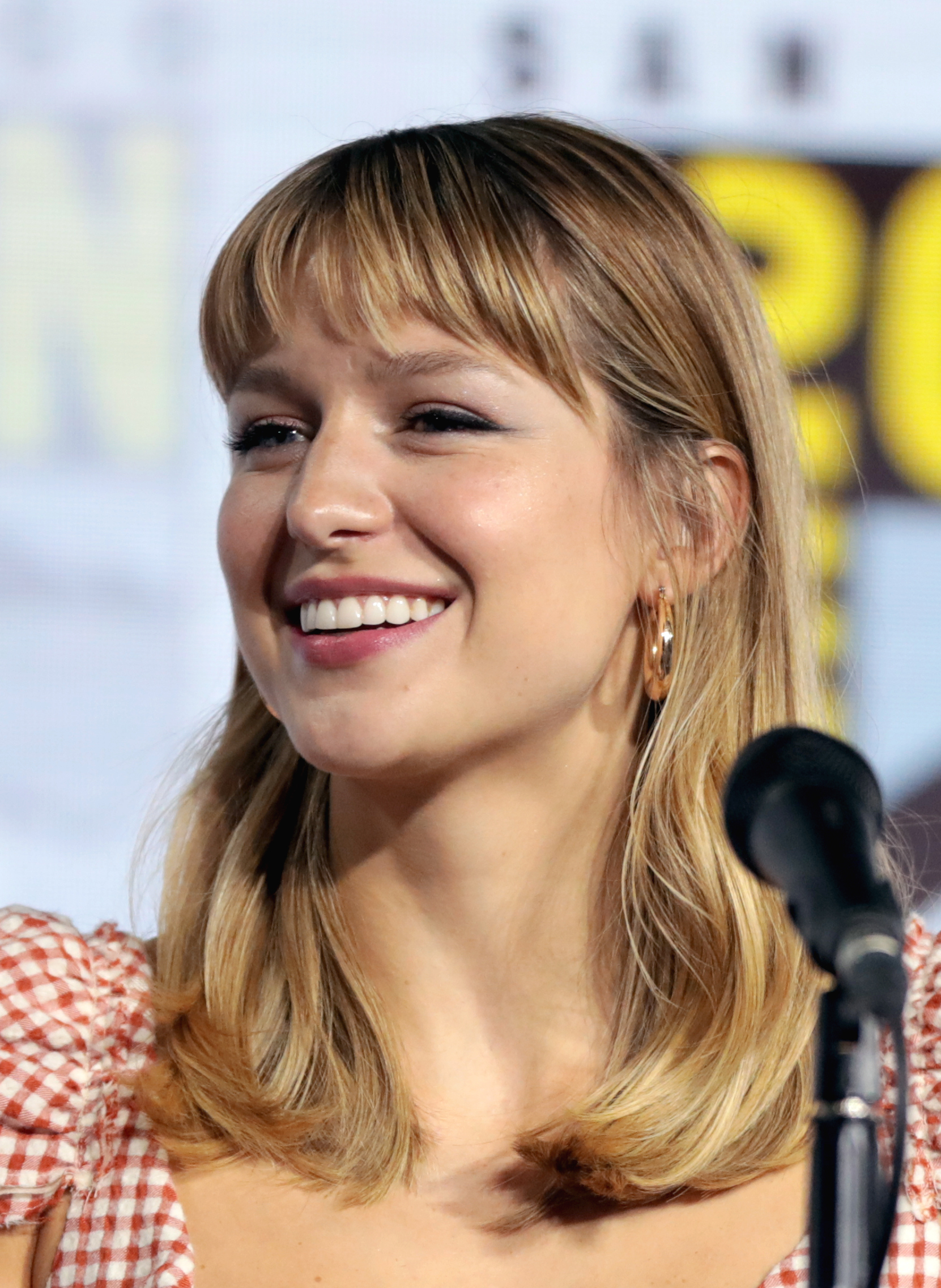
Melissa Benoist

=== 2022 ===
- Ava: A Year of Adventure in the Life of an American Avocet – Mandy Kern and Onalee Nicklin
- Blue Collar Saint: Poems – Brenda Leigh White
- Field Journal: Volume XIII, 2021, The Santa Fe Trail – Symphony in the Flint Hills
- From This Moment: A Novel – Kim Vogel Sawyer
- The Greatest Thing: A Story About Buck O'Neil – Kristy Nerstheimer and Christian Paniagua
- Haven's Secret (The Powers Book 1) – Melissa Benoist, Jessica Benoist, and Mariko Tamaki
- How to Resist Amazon and Why – Danny Caine
- Killing Dragons: Order of the Dolphin – Kristie Clark
- Mad Prairie: Stories and a Novella – Kate McIntyre
- Policing Sex in the Sunflower State: The Story of the Kansas State Industrial Farm for Women – Nicole Perry
- Running Out: In Search of Water on the High Plains – Lucas Bessire
- Stormbreak: A Seafire Novel – Natalie C. Parker
- A Vote for Susanna: The First Woman Mayor – Karen M. Greenwald and Sian James
- White Hot Hate: A True Story of Domestic Terrorism in America's Heartland – Dick Lehr
- Words Is a Powerful Thing: Twenty Years of Teaching Creative Writing at Douglas County Jail – Brian Daldorph

=== 2021 ===
- All Hallows' Shadow – Michael D. Graves
- The Amelia Six – Kristin L. Gray
- The Chicken Sisters – KJ Dell’Antonia
- Croaked!: The Misadventures of Nobbin Swill – Lisa Harkrader
- Farmers Unite!: Planting a Protest for Fair Prices – Lindsay H. Metcalf
- Ladybird, Collected – Meg Heriford
- Un Mango Grows in Kansas – Huascar Medina
- Mawson's Mission: Launching Women's Intercollegiate Athletics at the University of Kansas – L. Marlene Mawson
- Northern Cheyenne Ledger Art by Fort Robinson Breakout Survivors – Denise Low and Ramon Powers
- People, Pride, and Promise: The Story of the Dockum Sit-in – Prisca Barnes and Priscella Brown
- Prairie Bachelor: The Story of a Kansas Homesteader and the Populist Movement – Lynda Beck Fenwick
- Premeditated Myrtle: A Myrtle Hardcastle Mystery – Elizabeth C. Bunce
- Swimming Shelter: Poems – Al Ortolani
- What Sound is Morning? – Grant Snider
- World of Wonders: In Praise of Fireflies, Whale Sharks, and Other Astonishments – Aimee Nezhukumatathil

=== 2020 ===
- Birds, Bones, and Beetles: The Improbable Career and Remarkable Legacy of University of Kansas Naturalist Charles D. Bunker – Charles H. Warner
- A Constellation of Roses – Miranda Asebedo
- Crumbled!: The Misadventures of Nobbin Swill – Lisa Harkrader
- Follow Me Down to Nicodemus Town – A. LaFaye and Nicole Tadgell
- Headwinds: A Memoir – Edna Bell-Pearson
- The Healer's Daughter: A Novel – Charlotte Hinger
- How to Be a Family: The Year I Dragged My Kids Around the World to Find a New Way to Be Together – Dan Kois
- Journey to a Promised Land: A Story of the Exodusters (I Am America) – Allison Lassieur
- Kansas City Chiefs Legends: The Greatest Coaches, Players and Front Office Execs in Chiefs History – Jeff Deters
- A Perfect Silhouette – Judith Miller
- Petroglyphs of the Kansas Smoky Hills – Rex C. Buchanan, Burke W. Griggs, Joshua L. Svaty
- The Reckless Oath We Made: A Novel – Bryn Greenwood
- Steel Tide: A Seafire Novel – Natalie C. Parker
- The Topeka School: A Novel – Ben Lerner
- What Color Is Night? – Grant Snider

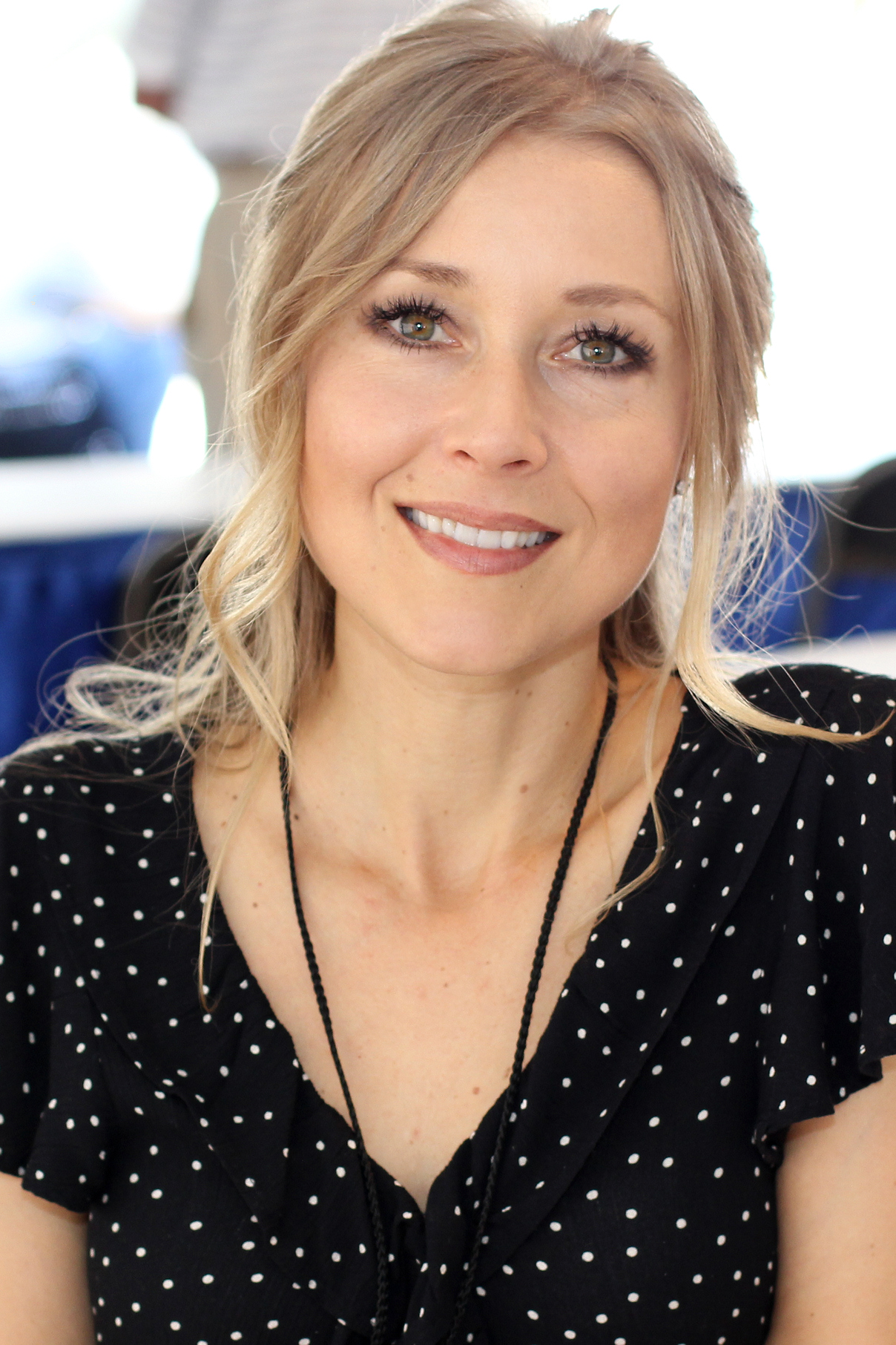
Sarah Smarsh

=== 2019 ===
- American Heart – Laura Moriarty
- Brown Enough: A Tale of a Mixed-Race Baseball Team Summer of ’56 – Ken Ohm
- Buried in the Suburbs – Jamie Lynn Heller
- The Deepest Roots – Miranda Asebedo
- The Diaries of Reuben Smith, Kansas Settler and Civil War Soldier – Lana Wirt Myers
- Eisenhower: Becoming the Leader of the Free World – Louis Galambos
- Elevations: A Personal Exploration of the Arkansas River – Max McCoy
- A Girl Stands at the Door: The Generation of Young Women Who Desegregated America's Schools – Rachel Devlin
- Heartland: A Memoir of Working Hard and Being Broke in the Richest Country on Earth – Sarah Smarsh
- Night Out – Daniel Miyares
- No Place Like Home: Lessons in Activism from LGBT Kansas – C.J. Janovy
- No Small Potatoes: Junius G. Groves and His Kingdom in Kansas – Tonya Bolden and Don Tate
- The Pastor Wears a Skirt: Stories of Gender and Ministry – Dorothy Nickel Friesen
- The Saint of Wolves and Butchers – Alex Grecian
- Seafire – Natalie C. Parker

=== 2018 ===
- Bad Kansas: Stories – Becky Mandelbaum
- Cricket in the Thicket: Poems about Bugs – Carol Murray and Melissa Sweet
- Dodge City: Wyatt Earp, Bat Masterson, and the Wickedest Town in the American West – Tom Clavin
- Feet of the Messenger: Poems – H.C. Palmer
- Fireflies in the Gathering Dark: Poems – Maril Crabtree
- Headlights on the Prairie: Essays on Home – Robert Rebeinsas
- Ike and McCarthy: Dwight Eisenhower's Secret Campaign Against Joseph McCarthy – David A. Nichols
- Kansas Baseball, 1858-1941 – Mark E. Eberle
- Kansas Guidebook 2 for Explorers – Marci Penner and WenDee Rowe
- The Man from the Train: The Solving of a Century-Old Serial Killer Mystery – Bill James and Rachel McCarthy James
- Midnight at the Electric – Jodi Lynn Anderson
- The Shape of Ideas: An Illustrated Exploration of Creativity – Grant Snider
- Stark Mad Abolitionists: Lawrence, Kansas, and the Battle over Slavery in the Civil War Era – Robert K. Sutton
- That is My Dream! – Langston Hughes and Daniel Miyares
- To The Stars Through Difficulties – Romalyn Tilghman

=== 2017 ===
- Fast-Food Sonnets: Poems – Dennis Etzel Jr.
- Ghost Sign: Poems from White Buffalo – Al Ortolani, Melissa Fite Johnson, Adam Jameson, and J.T. Knoll
- Green City: How One Community Survived a Tornado and Rebuilt for a Sustainable Future – Allan Drummond
- Hero of the Empire: The Boer War, a Daring Escape and the Making of Winston Churchill – Candice Millard
- Hurt People: A Novel – Cote Smith
- Ioway Life: Reservation and Reform, 1837-1860 – Greg Olson
- The Last Wild Places of Kansas: Journeys into Hidden Landscapes – George Frazier
- Lost and Gone Forever: A Novel of Scotland Yard's Murder Squad – Alex Grecian
- The Memory of Lemon: A Novel – Judith Fertig
- Mike Torrez: A Baseball Biography – Jorge Iber
- A Nest of Hornets – Robert Krenzel
- Never Enough Flamingos – Janelle Diller
- Phog: The Most Influential Man in Basketball – Scott Morrow Johnson
- Presenting Buffalo Bill: The Man Who Invented the Wild West – Candace Fleming
- The Small-Town Midwest: Resilience and Hope in the Twenty-First Century – Julianne Couch

=== 2016 ===
- Alphabet School – Stephen T. Johnson
- A Bitter Magic – Roderick Townley
- Bottled: A Mom's Guide to Early Recovery – Dana Bowman
- The Boy Who Became Buffalo Bill: Growing Up Billy Cody in Bleeding Kansas – Andrea Warren
- Diary of a Waitress: The Not-So-Glamorous Life of a Harvey Girl – Carolyn Meyer
- For the Sake of Art: The Story of a Kansas Renaissance – Cynthia Mines
- Harvey Houses of Kansas: Historic Hospitality from Topeka to Syracuse – Rosa Walston Latimer
- Kansas Trail Guide: The Best Hiking, Biking, and Riding in the Sunflower State – Jonathan Conard and Kristin Conard
- Kansas Wildflowers and Weeds – Michael John Haddock, Craig C. Freeman, and Janet E. Bare
- The Madman and the Assassin: The Strange Life of Boston Corbett, the Man Who Killed John Wilkes Booth – Scott Martelle
- Notorious Kansas Bank Heists: Gunslingers to Gangsters – Rod Beemer
- Sun and Moon – Lindsey Yankey
- To Leave a Shadow – Michael D. Graves
- Twenty-Five Years Among the Indians and Buffalo: A Frontier Memoir – by William D. Street, edited by Warren R. Street
- While the Kettle's On – Melissa Fite Johnson

=== 2015 ===
- 999 Kansas Characters: Ad Astra, a Biographical Series – Dave Webb, Terry Rombeck, and Beccy Tanner
- Bluebird – Lindsey Yankey
- A Carol Dickens Christmas: A Novel – Thomas Fox Averill
- Chasing Weather: Tornadoes, Tempests, and Thunderous Skies in Word and Image – Caryn Mirriam-Goldberg and Stephen Locke
- The Darkest Period: The Kanza Indians and Their Last Homeland, 1846-1873 – Ronald D. Parks
- The Devil's Workshop: A Novel of Scotland Yard's Murder Squad – Alex Grecian
- Field Guide to the Common Grasses of Oklahoma, Kansas, and Nebraska – Iralee Barnard
- Girl in Reverse – Barbara Stuber
- The Kansas Relays: Track and Field Tradition in the Heartland – Joe D. Schrag
- Michael Pearce's Taste of the Kansas Outdoors Cookbook – Michael Pearce
- Music I Once Could Dance To – Roy J. Beckemeyer
- The Ogallala Road: A Memoir of Love and Reckoning – Julene Bair
- Railroad Empire across the Heartland: Rephotographing Alexander Gardner's Westward Journey – by James E. Sherow, photographs by John R. Charlton
- Soldiers in the Army of Freedom: The 1st Kansas Colored, the Civil War's First African American Combat Unit – Ian Michael Spurgeo
- Waiting on the Sky: More Flyover People Essays – Cheryl Unruh

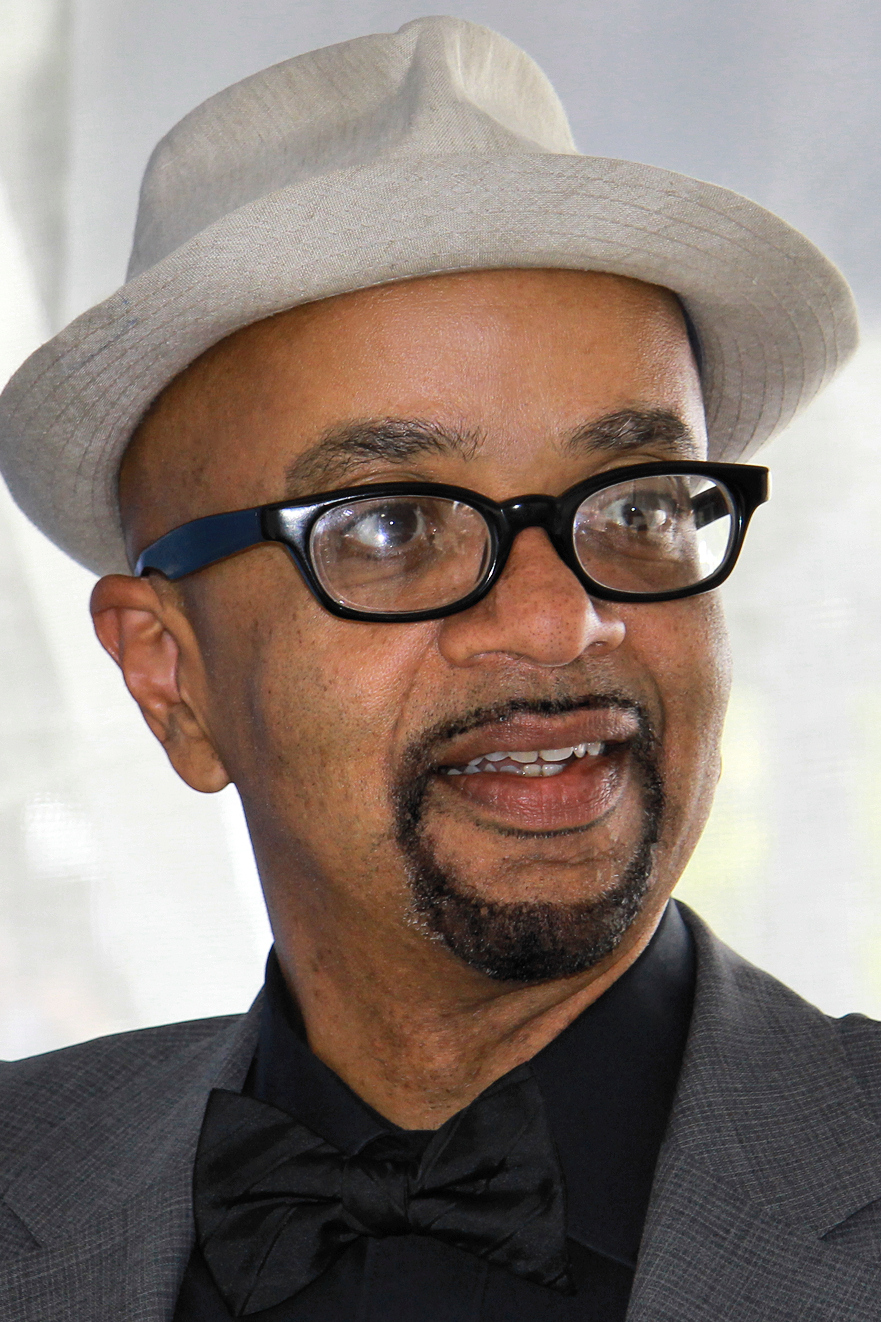
James McBride

=== 2014 ===
- Biting Through the Skin: An Indian Kitchen in America's Heartland – Nina Mukerjee Furstenau
- The Black Country – Alex Grecian
- Bleeding Kansas, Bleeding Missouri: The Long Civil War on the Border – Jonathan Earle & Diane Mutti Burke, Eds.
- A Death at Crooked Creek: The Case of the Cowboy, the Cigarmaker, and the Love Letter – Marianne Wesson
- Dragging Wyatt Earp: A Personal History of Dodge City – Robert Rebein
- Echoes from the Prairie: A Collection of Short Memoirs – Nicole Muchmore, Ed.
- Edmund G. Ross: Soldier, Senator, Abolitionist – Richard A. Ruddy
- The Good Lord Bird – James McBride
- Navigating Early – Clare Vanderpool
- Needle in the Bone – Caryn Mirriam-Goldberg
- Of Grave Concern: An Ophelia Wylde Paranormal Mystery – Max McCoy
- Teatime to Tailgates: 150 Years at the K-State Table – Jane P. Marshall
- The Thing About Luck – Cynthia Kadohata
- The Tie That Bound Us: The Women of John Brown's Family – Bonnie Laughlin-Schultz
- Worth the Pain: How Meningitis Nearly Killed Me - Then Changed My Life for the Better – Andy Marso

=== 2013 ===
- The Adventures of Beanboy – Lisa Harkrader
- Beyond Cold Blood: The KBI from Ma Barker to BTK – Larry Welch
- Blackbear Bosin: Keeper of the Indian Spirit – David Simmonds
- The Chaperone – Laura Moriarty
- The Dust Bowl: An Illustrated History – Dayton Duncan & Ken Burns
  - (companion book to The Dust Bowl)
- Eisenhower in War and Peace – Jean Edward Smith
- Frontier Manhattan: Yankee Settlement to Kansas Town, 1854–1894 – Kevin G. W. Olson
- A Kansas Bestiary – Jake Vail & Doug Hitt, and illustrated by Lisa Grossman
- May B. – Caroline Starr Rose
- This Ecstasy They Call Damnation – Israel Wasserstein
- Time's Shadow: Remembering a Family Farm in Kansas – Arnold J. Bauer
- To the Stars Through Difficulties: A Kansas Renga in 150 Voices – Caryn Mirriam-Goldberg, Ed.
- A Voice for Kanzas – Debra McArthur
- Wide Open – Larry Bjornson
- The Yard – Alex Grecian

=== 2012 ===
- 8 Wonders of Kansas! – Marci Penner
- The Afterlives of Trees – Wyatt Townley
- Amelia Lost: The Life and Disappearance of Amelia Earhart – Candace Fleming
- Bent Road – Lori Roy
- Destiny of the Republic: A Tale of Madness, Medicine and the Murder of a President – Candice Millard
- Doc – Mary Doria Russell
- The Door in the Forest – Roderick Townley
- Liar's Moon – Elizabeth C. Bunce
- My Ruby Slippers: The Road Back to Kansas – Tracy Seeley
- The Northern Cheyenne Exodus in History and Memory – Ramon Powers & James N. Leiker
- Osa and Martin: For the Love of Adventure – Kelly Enright
- Prairie Fire: A Great Plains History – Julie Courtwright
- Rode – Thomas Fox Averill
- Send Me Work: Stories – Katherine Karlin
- Tapped Out: Rear Naked Chokes, the Octagon, and the Last Emperor: an Odyssey in Mixed Martial Arts – Matthew Polly

=== 2011 ===
- Amy Barickman's Vintage Notions – Amy Barickman
- And Hell Followed With It – Bonar Menninger
- Appetite for America – Stephen Fried
- Baking With Friends – Sharon Davis & Charlene Patton
- Bound – Antonya Nelson
- Crossing the Tracks – Barbara Stuber
- A Distant Home – George Paris
- Flyover People – Cheryl Unruh
- Ghost Stories of the New West – Denise Low
- Life in a Jar – Jack Mayer
- Moon Over Manifest – Clare Vanderpool
- A Prairie Peter Pan – Beverley O. Buller
- Prairie Rhythms – Lana Wirt Myers
- The Scent of Rain and Lightning – Nancy Pickard
- Star Crossed – Elizabeth C. Bunce

=== 2010 ===
- Addie of the Flint Hills: A Prairie Child During the Depression – Adaline Sorace, as told to Deborah Sorace Prutzman
- The Blue Shoe: A Tale of Thievery, Villainy, Sorcery, and Shoes – Roderick Townley, and illustrated by Mary GrandPre
- Carter Finally Gets It – Brent Crawford
- The Evolution of Shadows – Jason Quinn Malott
- Ghost Town – Richard W. Jennings
- A Kansas Year – Mike Blair
- Lisa's Flying Electric Piano – Kevin Rabas
- Nothing Right: Short Stories – Antonya Nelson
- One Kansas Farmer: A Kansas Number Book – Devin Scillian & Corey Scillian
- Our Boys: A Perfect Season on the Plains with the Smith Center Redmen – Joe Drape
- Silver Shoes – Paul Miles Schneider
- The Storm in the Barn – written and illustrated by Matt Phelan
- To the Stars: Kansas Poets of the Ad Astra Poetry Project – Denise Low, Ed.
- Under Siege!: Three Children at the Civil War Battle for Vicksburg – Andrea Warren
- Years of Dust: The Story of the Dust Bowl – Albert Marrin

=== 2009 ===
- Amelia Earhart: the Legend of the Lost Aviator – Shelley Tanaka, and illustrated by David Craig
- Artfully Done: Food, Flowers & Joy Across Generations – RoxAnn Banks Dicker, Ed.
- Burn – Kathleen Johnson
- Charlatan: America's Most Dangerous Huckster, the Man Who Pursued Him, and the Age of Flimflam – Pope Brock
- A Curse Dark as Gold – Elizabeth C. Bunce
- The Guide to Kansas Birds and Birding Hot Spots – Bob Gress & Pete Janzen
- Hometown Appetites: The Story of Clementine Paddleford, the Forgotten Food Writer Who Chronicled How America Ate – Kelly Alexander & Cynthia Harris
- Kansas Opera Houses: Actors and Community Events 1855–1925 – Jane Glotfelty Rhoads
- Making History: Quilts & Fabric From 1890–1970 – Barbara Brackman
- Marco Polo Didn't Go There: Stories and Revelations From One Decade as a Postmodern Travel Writer – Rolf Potts
- The Nature of Kansas Lands – Beverley Worster, Ed.
- A Passion for Nature: The Life of John Muir – Donald Worster
- The Pizza Hut Story – Robert Spector
- Seeding Civil War: Kansas in the National News, 1854–1858 – Craig Miner
- Survival of Rural America: Small Victories and Bitter Harvests – Richard E. Wood

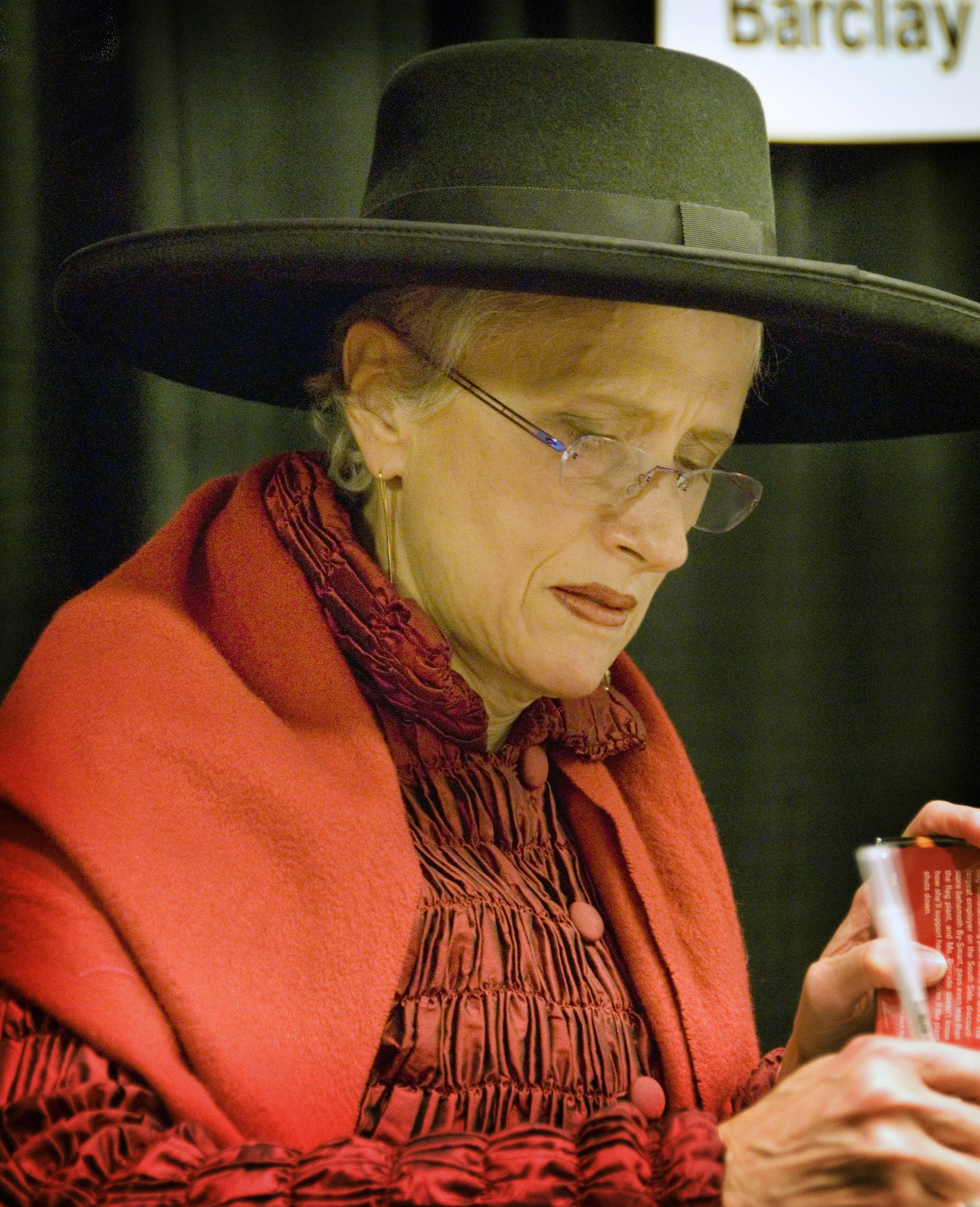
Sara Paretsky

=== 2008 ===
- American Shaolin: Flying Kicks, Buddhist Monks, and the Legend of Iron Crotch: An Odyssey in the New China – Matthew Polly
- The Boy Who Was Raised by Librarians – illustrated by Brad Sneed
- Can I Keep My Jersey? 11 Teams, 5 Countries, and 4 Years in My Life as a Basketball Vagabond – Paul Shirley
- The Curse of Catunkhamun – Tim Raglin
- The Farther Shore – Matthew Eck
- From Emporia: The Story of William Allen White – Beverley O. Buller
- Hellfire Canyon – Max McCoy
- Hunger for the Wild: America's Obsession with the Untamed West – Michael L. Johnson
- The Kitchen Sink: New and Selected Poems, 1972–2007 – Albert Goldbarth
- A Matter of Justice: Eisenhower and the Beginning of the Civil Rights Revolution – David A. Nichols
- The Middle of Somewhere – J.B. Cheaney
- The Rest of Her Life – Laura Moriarty
- Sea Monsters: Prehistoric Creatures of the Deep – Michael J. Everhart
  - (companion book to Sea Monsters: A Prehistoric Adventure)
- Storm Chaser: A Photographer's Journey – Jim Reed
- Writing in an Age of Silence – Sara Paretsky

=== 2007 ===
In 2007, 18 Kansas Notable Books were selected; the only year in which it was not a list of fifteen.

- Afoot: A Tale of the Great Dakota Turkey Drive – George Brandsberg
- Angle of Yaw – Ben Lerner
- Ballots and Bullets: The Bloody County Seat Wars of Kansas – Robert K. DeArment
- Flint Hills Cowboys: Tales From the Tallgrass Prairie – James Hoy
- I'd Tell You I Love You, But Then I'd Have To Kill You – Ally Carter
- John Brown to Bob Dole: Movers and Shakers in Kansas – Virgil Dean, Ed.
- John Steuart Curry: The Road Home – Alice Bertels
- Kansas Murals: A Traveler's Guide – Lora Jost & Dave Loewenstein
- Light on Main Street: Storytelling by a Country Newspaper Editor – Rudy Taylor
- The Loose Change of Wonder – Steven Hind
- My Little Yellow Taxi – Stephen Johnson
- Next Year Country: Dust to Dust in Western Kansas, 1890–1940 – Craig Miner
- Not Afraid of Dogs – Susanna Pitzer
- Ogallala Blue: Water and Life on the High Plains – William Ashworth
- Revolutionary Heart: The Life of Clarina Nichols and the Pioneering Crusade for Women's Rights – Diane Eickhoff
- Shanghai Shadows – Lois Ruby
- The Virgin of Small Plains – Nancy Pickard
- Words of a Prairie Alchemist – Denise Low

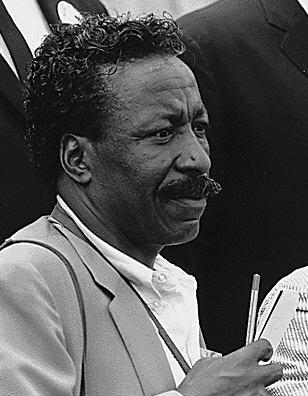
Gordon Parks

=== 2006 ===
- Airball: My Life in Briefs – L.D. Harkrader
- Capote in Kansas: A Drawn Novel – Ande Parks
- The Darkest Dawn: Lincoln, Booth, and the Great American Tragedy – Thomas Goodrich
- Deputy Harvey and the Ant Cow Caper – Brad Sneed
- The Great Blues – Steve Semken
- A Hungry Heart: A Memoir – Gordon Parks
- In the Small, Small Night – Jane Kurtz
- John Brown, Abolitionist – David S. Reynolds
- The Kansas Guidebook for Explorers – Marci Penner
- Maggie Rose and Sass – Eunice Boeve
- The Moon Butter Route – Max Yoho
- Oceans of Kansas: A Natural History of the Western Interior Sea – Michael J. Everhart
- Ordinary Genius – Thomas Fox Averill
- Wildflowers and Grasses of Kansas: A Field Guide – Michael John Haddock
- The Youngest Brother: On a Kansas Wheat Farm During the Roaring Twenties and the Great Depression – C. Hugh Snyder
