= Poet Laureate of Kansas =

The poet laureate of Kansas is the poet laureate for the U.S. state of Kansas. The program is managed by the Kansas Creative Arts Industries Commission.

== List of poets laureate ==
- Jonathan Holden (2005-2007)
- Denise Low (2007-2009)
- Caryn Mirriam-Goldberg (2009-2013)
- Wyatt Townley (2013-2015)
- Eric McHenry (2015-2017)
- Kevin Rabas (2017-2019)
- Huascar Medina (2019-2022)
- Traci Brimhall (2022–2024)

== See also ==
- Poet laureate
- List of U.S. state poets laureate
- United States Poet Laureate
