= The University News =

The University News may refer:

- The University News (Saint Louis University) at Saint Louis University (United States)
- The University News (University of Missouri–Kansas City), at the University of Missouri–Kansas City
- The Independent Florida Alligator (formerly The University News), at the University of Florida
- The University News (Moscow), a Russian newspaper that covers information about all universities
- University News (FPU), see Fresno Pacific University
- The University News, University of Dallas student-run newspaper
