= Max Yoho =

American novelist (1934–2017)

- Born: June 18, 1934; Colony, Kansas, U.S.
- Died: April 22, 2017 (aged 82); Topeka, Kansas, U.S.
- Occupations: Writer, machinist

Marion Max Yoho (June 18, 1934 – April 22, 2017) was an American writer. He began writing humorous books and poetry in 1988 after becoming a widower, and wrote several books including The Revival and Tales from Comanche County.

== Biography ==
Max Yoho was born in Colony, Kansas in 1934, the son of Lloyd George Yoho and Nellie Christenberry Yoho. His father worked for the railroad. In 1944 he moved with his family to Atchison, Kansas and in 1949 to Topeka, Kansas. He graduated from Topeka High School in 1953, and enrolled at Washburn University where he wrote for The Review, a student newspaper.

Yoho worked as a machinist for 38 years, including over thirty years at the Goodyear Tire & Rubber plant in Topeka.

Yoho began writing for publication after he became a widower in 1988, and retired in 1992. Focusing on poetry, essays and short-short stories, much of Yoho's early work was published in Inscape, the literary journal produced by Washburn University in the late 1980s and early 1990s.

== Publications ==
- The Revival, 2001, Dancing Goat Press, ISBN 978-0-9708160-0-9
- Tales From Comanche County, 2002, Dancing Goat Press, ISBN 978-0-9708160-1-6
- Felicia, These Fish Are Delicious, 2004, Dancing Goat Press, ISBN 978-0-9708160-3-0
- The Moon Butter Route, 2006, Dancing Goat Press, ISBN 978-0-9708160-4-7
- With the Wisdom of Owls, 2010, Dancing Goat Press, ISBN 978-0-9708160-5-4
- Me and Aunt Izzy, 2011, Dancing Goat Press, ISBN 978-0-9708160-6-1

== Writing career ==
Yoho published his first humorous novel, The Revival, in 2001 and won the 2002 J. Donald Coffin Memorial Book Award of the Kansas Authors Club. He is the only Kansas author to have two titles, The Moon Butter Route (published in 2006) and The Revival in the Kansas Center for the Book's Favorite Kansas Books list.

Yoho's third novel, The Moon Butter Route, was named a Kansas Notable Book by the Kansas State Librarian in 2006 and received the 2007 J. Donald Coffin Memorial Book Award of the Kansas Authors Club.

His poem "Vacant Lot" was published in The Midwest Quarterly of Pittsburg State University in Summer 2007. His short story "The Passing of the Old Snookertorium" was published in The Little Balkans Review, a Southeast Kansas literary & graphics journal, in Fall 2009, and was nominated by the editors for a Pushcart Prize in 2009.

Yoho's novel about a baby with an owl as his godfather, With the Wisdom of Owls, was published in 2010.

His novel Me and Aunt Izzy: Doing Time at the Jesse James Hideout and Coal Mining Company, was published in 2011. Set in the fictitious Buffalo County in Southeast Kansas, in 1938, it is the story of eleven-year-old Jefferson Davis Johnson, sentenced to a summer of "moral rehabilitation" under the watchful eye of his great-aunt, Queen Isabella of Spain Johnson.

Yoho was awarded one of eleven ARTY Awards by ArtsConnect of NE Kansas in 2011. Max was presented with the Achievement Award for his career as a writer by the Kansas Authors Club at their 2013 convention in Wichita.

== Personal life ==
Yoho was married to his high school sweetheart, Rosemary Carter, in 1953 and they had three sons. She died in 1988. Yoho died at his Topeka in 2017, at age 82, from kidney failure. He was survived by his second wife Carol and his three sons.
