= Denise Low =

American poet

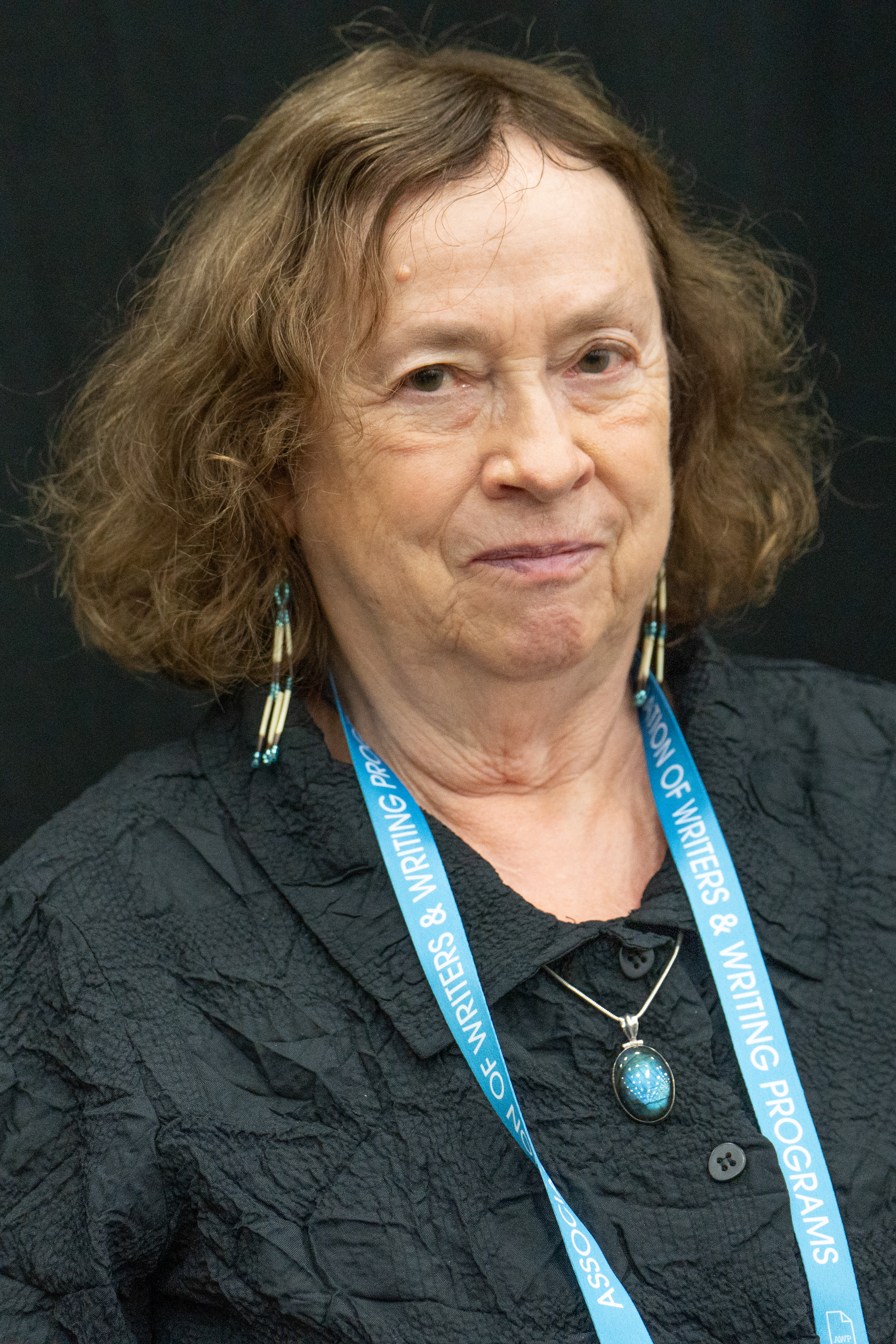
- Low at AWP 2026
- Born: Denise Dotson; Emporia, Kansas, U.S.
- Education: Wichita State University
- Occupations: poet; educator
- Spouse: Thomas Pecore Weso
- Writing career
- Notable awards: Kansas poet laureate
- Website: deniselow.com

Denise Low (born 1949) is an American poet, honored as the second Kansas poet laureate (2007–2009). As a professor at Haskell Indian Nations University, Low taught literature, creative writing and American Indian studies courses at the university.

== Early life and education ==
Denise Dotson was born and grew up in Emporia, Kansas. Her parents are Francis Dotson and Dorothy (Bruner) Dotson.

In Emporia, she was a high school correspondent for the Emporia Gazette.

She attained her bachelor, masters and doctoral degrees in English from the University of Kansas, and an M.F.A. in creative writing from Wichita State University.

She has extensively documented her Lenape heritage in her memoir, The Turtle's Beating Heart: One Family's Story of Lenape Survival (University of Nebraska Press). She is not an enrolled citizen of any Lenape tribe.

== Career ==
=== Educator ===
Low left Haskell Indian Nations University in 2012 after 27 years as an administrator and faculty member.

She teaches classes for the School of Professional and Graduate Studies of Baker University as well as The Writers Place of Kansas City.

=== Writer ===
As poet laureate of Kansas, Low continued the efforts of the state's first laureate, Jonathan Holden, by providing an open dialogue with Kansas poets. Besides appearing at many venues across the state, she established the Ad Astra Poetry Project. Personally contributing to the project bi-monthly via written releases, Low discusses specific notable poets. She was succeeded as poet laureate by Caryn Mirriam-Goldberg on July 1, 2009.

She writes a regular poetry column for the Kansas City Star, and she is review editor of Yukhika-latuhse ("She tells us stories"), published by the Oneida Nations Arts Program.

Individual members of the Association of Writers & Writing Programs elected Low to the national board of directors 2008–2013. She has served the board as conference chair and president (2011-2012).

Her book of essays Natural Theologies: Essays about Literature of the New Middle West (The Backwaters Press 2011) is the first book of critical essays about contemporary grasslands-region literature. Three books by Low earned recognition from the Kansas State Library and the Kansas Center for the Book as Kansas Notable Books: Northern Cheyenne Ledger Art by Fort Robinson Breakout Survivors (2021); Ghost Stories of the New West: Prose and Poems (2010); To the Stars: Kansas Poets of the Ad Astra Project (2009); and Words of a Prairie Alchemist: Essays (2007). Ghost Stories was recognized by Circle of Minneapolis as one of the best Native books published in 2010.

Words of a Prairie Alchemist was designated a 2007 Notable Book by the State Library of Kansas. Thailand Journal was named a notable book of 2003 by the Kansas City Star. Low's other book New & Selected Poems: 1980-1999 was published by Penthe Press. In 2005, she edited the Lawrence Arts Center's Wakarusa Wetlands in Word & Image for Imagination. She and her husband Thomas Weso co-wrote a biographical work on the poet Langston Hughes.

Low has published over 20 books of poetry and essays and has received awards from the National Endowment for the Humanities, the Lannan Foundation, the Kansas Arts Commission, the Poetry Society of America and others. She reads and lectures regionally as well as nationally.

She has published poetry, reviews, articles about poetry and American Indian Literature in Midwest Quarterly, Kansas City Star, American Indian Literature, American Indian Culture and Research Journal, American Indian Quarterly, New Letters, North American Review, Conjuries, Connecticut Review, Yellow Medicine Review and others.

Scholar Katie Wolf, in a review essay on Low's poetry and autobiography, describes it as containing "powerful messages about Native American identity and the influences ancestors can have on later generations of a family."

== Personal life ==
Her husband was Thomas Pecore Weso (1953-2023), an author and a member of the Menominee Indian Nation of Wisconsin. They had founded Mammoth Publications, which specializes on Indigenous American literary works.

== Bibliography ==
=== Poetry ===
- House of Grace, House of Blood. University of Arizona Press, 2024.
- Mélange Block. Santa Fe, New Mexico: Red Mountain Press, 2014.
- Thailand Journal: Poems. Topeka: Woodley-Washburn University, 2003. Kansas City Star Notable book of 2003.
- New and Selected Poems. Lawrence/Middletown, CA: Penthe, 1999. 2nd printing 2007.
- Tulip Elegies: An Alchemy of Writing. Lawrence/Middletown CA: Penthe,1993.
- Vanishing Point. Wichita/New York City: Mulberry, 1991. Chapbook of poetry.
- Selective Amnesia. Stiletto I (Dec. 1988): u.p.
- Howling Dog. Chapbook of poetry.
- Starwater. Lawrence: Cottonwood Review Press (Univ. of Kansas), 1988.
- Learning the Language of Rivers. Midwest Quarterly 38.4 (Summer 1987): 473–510. Chapbook.
- Spring Geese and Other Poems. Lawrence: University of Kansas Natural History Museum Publications, 1984.
- Quilting. Lawrence: Holiseventh, 1984. Fine-press edition.
- Dragon Kite, in Mid-America Trio. Kansas City: BookMark Press-University of Missouri-Kansas City, 1981. Chapbook of poetry.

=== Fiction ===
- Jackalope. Santa Fe, New Mexico: Red Mountain Press, 2016.

=== Essays ===
- Natural Theologies: Literature of the Prairielands. Forthcoming, Omaha: Backwaters Press.
- Words of a Prairie Alchemist: The Art of Prairie Literature. North Liberty, Iowa: Ice Cube Press, 2006. 2007 Kansas Notable Book, State Library of Kansas.
- Langston Hughes in Lawrence: Photographs and Biographical Resources. With T.F.Pecore Weso. Lawrence: Mammoth, 2004.
- Touching the Sky: Essays. Lawrence/Middletown, CA: Penthe, 1994.

=== Books edited and authored ===
- Northern Cheyenne Ledger Art by Fort Robinson Breakout Survivors Co-au. with Ramon Powers, University of Nebraska Press, 2020.
- The Turtle's Beating Heart: One Family's Story of Lenape Survival. University of Nebraska Press, 2017.
- Wakarusa Wetlands in Word and Image. Lawrence: Imagination & Place and Lawrence Arts Center, 2005.
- Teaching Leslie Marmon Silko’s Ceremony. Co-ed. with Peter G. Beidler. Special issue of American Indian Culture and Research Journal 28.1 (2004), UCLA.
- The Good Earth: Three Poets of the Prairie: Paul Engle, James Hearts, William Stafford. Eds. Denise Low, Robert Dana, Scott Cawelti. North Liberty: Ice Cube Press, 2002.
- Kansas Poems of William Stafford, with an introduction. Topeka: Woodley (Washburn Univ.), 1990. 7th printing 2007.
- A Confluence of Poems, a school edition. Lawrence: Cottonwood Review Press, 1984. 2nd printing, 1985.
- Confluence: Contemporary Kansas Poetry. Lawrence: Cottonwood Review Press (Univ. of Ks.), 1983.
- 30 Kansas Poets. Lawrence: Cottonwood Review Press (Univ. of Ks.), 1979. 2nd printing, 1980.

== Awards ==
- Kansas Poet Laureate, selected by the governor and Kansas Arts Commission, July 2007 – 2009
- Prairie Alchemist selected for Kansas Notable Book by Gov. and Ks. State Library, 2007.
- Lawrence Arts Commission Grant, to Ice Cube Press, for Words of a Prairie Alchemist: The Art of Literature, 2005.
- Wordcraft Circle Annual Gathering Service Award, Haskell and KU, March 2003.
- Phoenix Award, Lawrence Arts Commission, individual award in literary arts, 2000.
- Lawrence Arts Commission Grant, to Penthe Press for New and Selected Poems, 1999.
- Seaton Poetry Prize, Kansas Quarterly, 1991. "Dragonflies."
- Roberts Foundation National Writing Competition, 1989, 2nd, poetry, "Winter Count."
- Lawrence Arts Commission City Enhancement and Cultural Exchange Award, for Starwater (Cottonwood, 1988).
- Seaton Poetry Prize, Kansas Quarterly, 1988, "Mastodons."
- Pushcart Fiction Prize nomination, Redstart, James Mechem, ed. "Queen of Swords."
- Council for Advancement and Support of Education Regional Award of Excellence, for Spring Geese and Other Poems (University of Kansas Museum of Natural History Press, 1984).
- Academy of American Poets' Pami Jurassi Bush Award, 1983, 2nd, for "Quilting."
- Seaton Poetry Prize, Kansas Quarterly (1982). Third place, "Mt. Saint Helens Day."
- Lichtor Poetry Prize, Jewish Community Center, Kansas City, 1980, 1st, for "Place."
- Pushcart Poetry Prize nominations, Little Balkans Review, Gene DeGruson, editor for "Snakes" and, Naked Man, Michael Smetzer, editor for "Cold" and "Drought."

== Grants and fellowships ==
- Sequoyah National Research Center Fellowship, 2012, to study Yuki poet William Oandasan
- National Endowment for the Humanities Faculty Fellowship, 2011–2012, to develop online and text resources related to Northern Cheyenne ledger art relating to 1879 Kansas history
- Lannan Fellowship, The Newberry Library, “American Indian Societies, Cultures, and Gender in Midwestern and Eastern North America.” Summer 2001
- The Newberry Library, Chicago, Documentary Workshop Fellowship, "Native American Autobiography," 1992.
- Kansas Arts Commission Literary Arts Fellowship in Poetry, 1991. One award every two years to a poet in Kansas, at that time commonly referred to as the “poet laureate” for Kansas. $5000.
- Kansas Committee for the Humanities, Summer Seminar for Teachers Grant, "Native American Tribes in Kansas: Cultural Persistence," 1991, seminar director and lead scholar.
- National Endowment for the Humanities Summer Institute Fellowship, Newberry Library, Chicago, "Myth, Memory, and History: Sources for Writing Native American History," 1991.
- National Endowment for the Humanities Summer Institute Fellowship, "Great Traditions in Native American Thought," University of California-Berkeley, 1987.
- Kansas Arts Commission Mini-grant: Funding for Summer Workshop, "Writing from Nature," Museums of Natural History, University of Kansas, 1985.
