= Heartland (Smarsh book) =

2018 autobiographical book by Sarah Smarsh

- Author: Sarah Smarsh
- Language: English
- Genre: Nonfiction, Memoir
- Publisher: Scribner
- Publication date: 2018
- Publication place: United States
- Media type: Print (hardback)
- Pages: 290
- ISBN: 978-1501133091

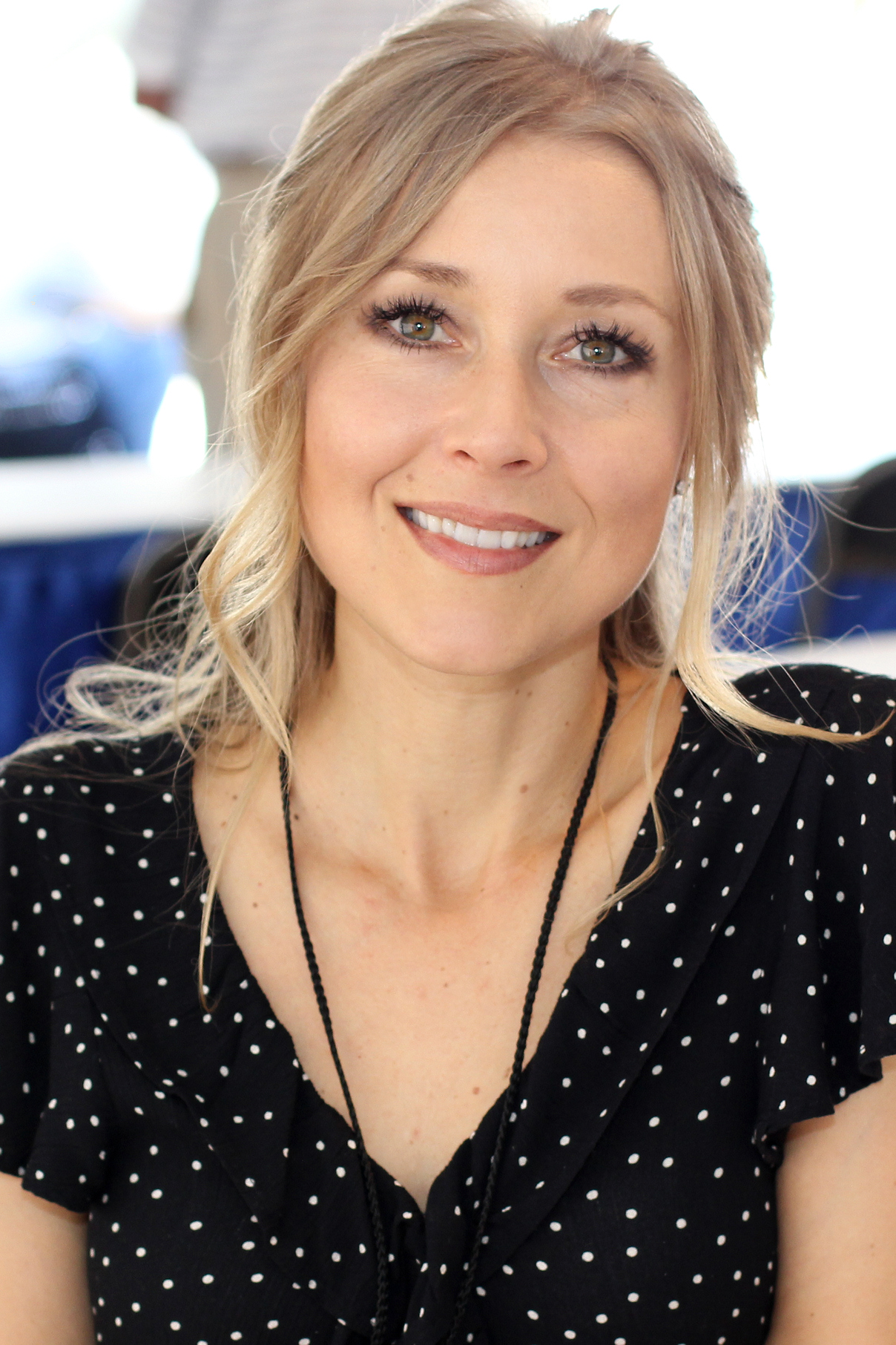
The author, Sarah Smarsh, in 2018

Heartland: A Memoir of Working Hard and Being Broke in the Richest Country on Earth is a 2018 non-fiction book by American journalist Sarah Smarsh. The book contains events from her life and the lives of her relatives, and it focuses on cycles of poverty and social class in the U.S. state of Kansas. Heartland was a finalist for the National Book Award for nonfiction in 2018 and a 2019 recipient of the Kansas Notable Book Award.

== Synopsis ==
Smarsh begins the book by focusing on previous generations of her family, each of them facing hardships due to poverty. Her maternal grandmother Betty moves far and frequently to escape difficult situations, layoffs, abusive men, and violent neighborhoods. Betty's seventh husband Arnie owned a farm, finally offering Betty some security. Though they struggle to make enough money, Sarah has fond memories of playing and working hard on their farm. Sarah's father, Nick, owns a foundation-laying business that evaporates when construction slows during the economic downturn in the early 1980s. Growing up in poverty on a Kansas farm, Sarah maintains a mixture of pride in her family's hard work and shame that the U.S. heaps on poor people, having fallen behind in a "supposed meritocracy."

Smarsh is able to break the cycles of addiction, teen pregnancy, and lack of education that have kept previous generations of her family in poverty, and she gets good grades, eventually going to college and later pursuing a teaching and writing career. She notes, however, that she can only do so because some in previous generations worked hard to break those cycles, despite great hardship. For instance, she credits steady affirmation from her grandparents, fewer changes of residence than either of her parents experienced, and being the only female in her family with a father who was neither violent nor abusive.

== Themes ==
Heartland's main theme is social class in the United States. Throughout the book, Smarsh identifies systemic obstacles facing the American poor, a culture where the importance of social class is often dismissed or de-emphasized. The poor, she argues, are thus treated as invisible or shamed for their condition. Smarsh shifts between her personal story and the national laws that had an impact on her and her family, illustrating each policy's effect on individuals in poverty. Smarsh argues that belief in the American Dream adds to the denial of the problem of social class and leads to the continued oppression of those in poverty. Leah Hampton of the Los Angeles Times states, "The Smarshes give up their bodies to the American Dream, raising your crops and butchering your meat. The wages for that labor are chronic stress, strained relationships and physical decline." Smarsh draws special attention to the suffering and the strength of women in poverty, using her framing device, writing to an imaginary unborn daughter, to emphasize the hardships the child might have faced and to describe how her own life might have been different if she had given birth to the child.

== Reception ==
In the Los Angeles Times, Hampton cautions readers that the book does not fit neatly into binary political categories, offering neither affirmation to urban liberals nor rural "hagiography" to conservatives: "Because farms are often a go-to setting for Americana, you may think you have read this book before. You haven't. This is not The Grapes of Wrath or Hillbilly Elegy, and it is never saccharine or self-deluding. This is a tough, no-nonsense woman telling truth, and telling it hard." Elizabeth Catte of The Washington Post calls Heartland a "thoughtful, big-hearted tale" that breaks "the national silence that hangs over the lives of the poor." Francesca Mari of The New York Times describes the book as "a deeply humane memoir with crackles of clarifying insight," though she criticizes Smarsh's framing device: Some of the book is written as if addressed to an unborn child, which she claims forces "the otherwise sage Smarsh to write in the inexorably sentimental second person." The Columbia Journal praises Smarsh's prose for maintaining "an element of regional diction that permeates much of America's best literature. Her plain language with its unique country lilt is paired with elegant turns of phrase that describe both Smarsh's family's specificities and also broader truths."
