= Thomas Fox Averill =

American novelist

- Born: April 30, 1949 (age 77)
- Occupations: Writer; novelist; academic
- Writing career
- Notable awards: Kansas Notable Book Award (2006, 2012)
- Website: www.washburn.edu/cas/english/taverill/index.html

Thomas Fox Averill (born April 30, 1949) is an American writer, novelist, and academic from Topeka, Kansas. His works, including Secrets of the Tsil Cafe, The Slow Air of Ewan Macpherson, Ordinary Genius, and, more recently Rode, have won wide acclaim in Kansas and throughout the United States. He is a two-time winner of Kansas Notable Book Awards.

Averill is a writer-in-residence and professor of English at Topeka's Washburn University. Well known as a writer and teacher, Averill has published numerous works of fiction, short stories, and stories on his native Kansas and society at large.
