= Grant Snider =

American cartoonist

Grant Snider is an American cartoonist, comic strip artist, writer and orthodontist.

== Life and career ==
Snider grew up in Derby, Kansas, with his twin brother, Gavin, also an illustrator. He studied engineering at the University of Kansas, and then dentistry at the University of Missouri-Kansas City. He drew strips for both college newspapers: the University Daily Kansan and The University News; for that work he won the College Cartoonist Charles M. Schulz Award in 2008.

Later that year he drew the strip Delayed Karma for the Kansas City Star and in 2009 he launched his online Incidental Comics, featuring strips about art, literature and the creative process. His strips have been featured in magazines such as The New York Review of Books and The New York Times Magazine and compiled in two books: The Shape of Ideas (2018) and I Will Judge You by Your Bookshelf (2020), the latter a collection of comics about the love of writing and reading.

Snider also is the author of children's picture books What Color is Night (2019) and What Sound is Morning (2020).

Grant now lives in Wichita, Kansas, with his wife and children. He works a day job as an orthodontist. and his hobbies are cooking breakfast, reading, running, drawing, and redrawing.

== Works ==
=== As author ===
- The Shape of Ideas Sketchbook. Harry N. Abrams. 2018. ISBN 9781419729195.
- What Color Is Night?. Chronicle Books. 2019. ISBN 9781452179926.
- What Sound Is Morning?. Chronicle Books. 2020. ISBN 9781452179933.
- My Words. HarperCollins. 2020. ISBN 9780062907806.
- The Art of Living: Reflections on Mindfulness and the Overexamined Life. Harry N. Abrams. 2022. ISBN 9781419753510.
- I Will Judge You by Your Bookshelf. Abrams Comic Arts. 2022. ISBN 9781683358602.
- The Shape of Ideas: An Illustrated Exploration of Creativity. Harry N. Abrams. 2022. ISBN 9781683350316.
- One Boy Watching. Chronicle Books. 2022. ISBN 9781797210889.
- Nothing Ever Happens on a Gray Day. Chronicle Books. 2023. ISBN 9781797210896.
- Poetry Comics. Chronicle Books. 2024. ISBN 9781797219653.
- Thinking About Thinking: Impossible Thoughts and Complicated Feelings. Harry N. Abrams. 2025. ISBN 9781419776588.

=== As illustrator ===
- Trinder, Theresa; Snider, Grant; There Is a Rainbow. Chronicle Books LLC. 2021. ISBN 9781797212074.
- Jonker, Travis; Snider, Grant; Blue Floats Away. Harry N. Abrams. 2021. ISBN 9781419744235.
