= Mad Prairie =

2021 short story collection

- Author: Kate McIntyre
- Publisher: University of Georgia Press
- Publication date: 2021
- Pages: 176
- ISBN: 9780820360744

Mad Prairie is a short story collection by Kate McIntyre, published in 2021 by the University of Georgia Press. It contains seven short stories and a novella, focused on McIntyre's home state of Kansas. The stories are linked by their shared setting and by relationships between the characters, which are sometimes explained belatedly as a surprise reveal.

Kansas is portrayed as a repressive place to live. Anuradha Prasad describes McIntyre's Kansas as "a dead end to dreams—stunted and stifling, its landscape uninspiring." According to Patrick Carey writing for the Colorado Review, "ultra-traditional gender and sex relations" are "fundamental" to the collection's depiction of Kansas as "a black hole that binds together people" who know they should actually leave their current situation. In an interview, McIntyre stated that she did not want the novel to be read as solely a criticism of Kansas, expressing affection for Kansans and for the Kansas landscape.

Many of the stories focus on violence, especially in the novella. McIntyre described "the unpredictability of male anger" as a core theme, and said she wanted to show how it can be mingled with love and humour. The violence of the stories exists in parallel with mundane events that Carey describes as "the endless dopiness of people going through everyday life". Prasad describes the characters as "a parade of passive, hapless, and sinister characters" who "tread wildly absurd and terrifying paths". Carey compares McIntyre to both Shirley Jackson (for the Gothic horror of the violent events) and to George Saunders (for the humorous "dopey couples").

The collection won the Flannery O'Connor Award for Short Fiction in 2020, which led to its publication by the University of Georgia Press the following year. It was also selected as a 2022 Kansas Notable Book, chosen by the Kansas Center for the Book at the State Library of Kansas, and longlisted for the PEN/Robert W. Bingham Prize for a debut short-story collection.

== Author ==
Kate McIntyre was raised in Salina, Kansas. Her mother was the director of the Salina Education Foundation. McIntyre began writing in elementary school. She graduated from Salina Central High School in 2000, and later attended Harvard University. As of 2025, she is an associate professor of creative writing at the Worcester Polytechnic Institute. There, she edits the literary journal The Worcester Review.
