= Salmon Arm Roots and Blues Festival =

Music festival in Salmon Arm, British Columbia, Canada

- Genre: Music festival
- Dates: July 24-26. 2026
- Frequency: Annual
- Locations: Salmon Arm, British Columbia, Canada
- Years active: 33
- Founded: 1991
- Attendance: 31,944 (2022)
- Patron: 30,000 +
- Organiser: Salmon Arm Folk Music Society
- Website: https://rootsandblues.ca/

The Salmon Arm Roots and Blues Festival is a 3 day summer music festival. It has four - six stages and features an international roster of artists as well as a strong contingent of Canadian talent. The event takes place at the Salmon Arm Fair Grounds, an 18-acre site at the base of Mount Ida in Salmon Arm, a town located on the shores of the Shuswap Lake in British Columbia.

The festival features folk, blues, world, alternative, roots, electronica and many other different types of music and fusions. The festival also has food vendors, an artisan market, beer gardens, workshops, a children's area, and camping. It is wheelchair accessible and offers free admission to children 12 years and under as part of the festival's ongoing mandate to educate audiences to the diverse genres of music and musical instruments, and to the artists who play them.

The Festival's founding organization is the Salmon Arm Folk Music Society, a non-profit organization dedicated to supporting live music and the surrounding industry in The Shuswap.

== History ==
Roots and Blues began in 1992 as a small indoor festival, a result of the Shuswap Coffee House movement of the 1970s and 1980s, which by 1991 had coalesced into the not-for-profit Salmon Arm Folk Music Society, the festival's founding body. In 1992, the first Festival was held in a tiny country hall with only a small crowd of several hundred people attending. audiences steadily growing in subsequent years, in 2001 Roots and Blues moved to its current location and became an outdoor festival. From its grassroots beginnings it has grown into the largest and most musically diverse Festival in the British Columbian Interior. It has won many awards including Okanagan, readers' Choice award for 'The most rockin' festival'.

== Past performers ==
Past festival performers include: Buddy Guy, Downchild Blues Band, Buckwheat Zydeco, Angelique Kidjo, Natalie MacMaster, Jeff Healey, Kate & Anna McGarrigle, Bruce Cockburn, Great Big Sea, Tegan & Sara, Mick Taylor, Lee Harvey Osmond, Blue Rodeo, Colin James, Buddy Guy, Feist, Bedouin Soundclash, Corb Lund, Pointer Sisters, Xavier Rudd, Neville Brothers, Spirit of the West, Sam Roberts Band, the John Butler Trio, Joan Armatrading, K'Naan, Taj Mahal, Trombone Shorty, Kid Koala, Adham Shaikh, Blackie and the Rodeo Kings, The Shuffle Demons, Serena Ryder, Broken Social Scene, Current Swell, Raleigh, Johnny Winter, Super Chikan, Hollerado, Hazmat Modine, Five Alarm Funk, and City and Colour. The Balconies, The Belle Game, Ben Waters, BerlinskiBeat, The Bright Light Social Hour, Bruce Cockburn, Cam Penner, City and Colour, Corvus Corax, The Crooked Brothers, Daniel Lanois, Devon Coyote, Expression World Music Collective, Fatoumata Diawara, Felix Zenger, The Harpoonist and the Axe Murderer, Harry Manx, Horse Feathers, Jacky Essombe, Jason Collett, Kelley Hunt, Ky-Mani Marley, Malcolm Holcombe, Mighty Mo Rodgers, Mississippi Heat, Oh! Ogopogo!, Richard Perso, Rita Chiarelli, Sallie Ford and the Sound Outside, Santa Lucia LFR, Selah Sue, Shakura S'Aida, Skratch Bastid, Steve Strongman, Tommy Castro and the Painkillers, Treble Spot Jams, A Tribe Called Red, Vazzy, Watasun.
