= Kelley Hunt =

American pianist, singer

- Born: Kelley Wade; Kansas City, Missouri, United States
- Genres: Blues, R&B
- Occupations: Musician, songwriter, actress
- Instruments: Piano, vocals
- Years active: 1990s–present
- Label: 88
- Website: Official website

Kelley Hunt is an American blues pianist, singer, and songwriter. Her 2004 album, New Shade of Blue, peaked at number 9 in the Billboard Top Blues Albums chart.

In 2006, Hunt was inducted into the Kansas Music Hall of Fame. Her sixth album, The Beautiful Bones, was released on 88 Records in May 2014. She is based in Lawrence, Kansas.

== Life and career ==
She was born Kelley Wade in Kansas City, Missouri, United States, and was initially musically inspired by her mother's jazz and blues styled singing. She attended Lowther Junior High School in Emporia, Kansas, in 1970/71, and the University of Kansas in 1977.

Hunt's own musical influences came from a diverse range, including the work of Ruth Brown, Ann Peebles, Wanda Jackson, Jay McShann and Mary Lou Williams amongst others. Her self-titled debut album, which was released in 1995, featured the bassist Reggie McBride and saxophonist Wilton Felder. In 1998, Hunt's song "If I Don't Dance" from her debut album, was used in the film, Dance with Me. The album Inspiration, followed in October 2000. Her 2004 album, New Shade of Blue, which was produced by Garth Fundis and Gary Nicholson, peaked at number 9 in the Billboard Top Blues Albums chart. Her fourth album, Mercy was issued in 2009, and the Star Tribune noted "Surprises don't often crop up on the well-trodden blues circuit. This Kansan is a full-blown phenomenon: powerhouse singer, hardboogieing pianist, polished songwriter…"

In 2011, Gravity Loves You was released which included twelve new songs. As well as her own tracks, several were co-written with Caryn Mirriam-Goldberg. The St. Louis Beacon stated "Hunt's songwriting shines on powerful, moving compositions like 'Deep Old Love', 'This Fall', 'In the End' and the title cut. And she proves she can shine on the keyboard as well - with dynamic inspired playing throughout". She also released the single "Heartland", with Hunt on piano and vocals, plus the mandolin player Sam Bush. The same year she performed a piano/vocal duet with Sista Monica Parker on the latter's album, Living in the Danger Zone.

Hunt made her debut as an actress in Bunker Hill (2008), where she also contributed music to the film's soundtrack.

She has variously performed at the Omaha Blues, Jazz, & Gospel Festival, Salmon Arm Roots and Blues Festival (2013), Memphis in May, Austin City Limits Music Festival, and Thursday at the Square. In addition, she has appeared six times on A Prairie Home Companion.

Hunt's sixth album, The Beautiful Bones, was released in May 2014.

== Discography ==
Year	Title	Record label
1995	Kelley Hunt	88 Records
2000	Inspiration	88 Records
2004	New Shade of Blue	Coda Terra
2009	Mercy	88 Records
2011	Gravity Loves You	88 Records
2014	The Beautiful Bones	88 Records
2022	Winter Soulstice	88 Records

== Publication ==
- Landed: New Poetry (Lawrence, Kansas: Mammoth Publications), 2009. ISBN 0-9800102-3-3 (a book of poetry and CD with Caryn Mirriam-Goldberg presenting her poetry, as well as songs co-written and performed by Hunt)

== See also ==
- List of blues musicians
