= Eric McHenry =

American poet (born 1972)

- Born: April 12, 1972 (age 54); Topeka, Kansas, U.S.
- Education: Topeka High School; Beloit College; Boston University
- Occupation: Poet
- Writing career
- Notable awards: Kate Tufts Discovery Award (2007)

Eric McHenry (born April 12, 1972 Topeka, Kansas) is an American poet. He was the Poet Laureate of Kansas from 2015-2017.

== Life ==
McHenry is a 5th-generation Topekan and Topeka High School graduate. He graduated from Beloit College and Boston University. In April 2015 he was appointed to a two-year term as Poet Laureate of Kansas by the Kansas Humanities Council.

His work has appeared in The New Republic, Harvard Review, Northwest Review, Orion and AGNI.

He lives in Lawrence, Kansas with his family. He has taught at Washburn University in Topeka, Kansas since 2008. McHenry currently holds the position of Associate Professor of English and teaches Beginning Poetry Writing as well as Advanced College Writing.

== Awards ==
- 2007 Kate Tufts Discovery Award
- Academy of American Poets Prize
- 2011 Theodore Roethke Prize
- 2017 TLS Mick Imlah Poetry Prize (2nd place)

== Nominations ==
- McHenry has been nominated for the Pushcart Prize for poetry seven times.

== Works ==
=== Poetry ===
- Potscrubber Lullabies. (The Waywiser Press, 2006. ISBN 978-1-904130-22-2.
- Odd Evening (The Waywiser Press, 2016.
- Mommy Daddy Evan Sage (The Waywiser Press, 2011.

=== Anthology ===
- Bill Henderson, ed. (2004). The Pushcart Prize Xxviii 2004: Best of the Small Presses. The Pushcart Press. ISBN 978-1-888889-37-6.

=== Essays ===
- "Auden on Bin Laden", Slate, Sept. 20, 2001

=== Edited ===
Peggy of the Flint Hills: A Memoir by Zula Bennington Greene (The Woodley Press, 2012
