= Planet Comicon Kansas City =

Annual comic book convention

- Status: Active
- Genre: comic and pop culture
- Venue: Kansas City Convention Center
- Location: Kansas City, Missouri
- Country: USA
- Inaugurated: 1999
- Attendance: 50,000+ in 2018; 70,000+ in 2025
- Organizer: Chris Jackson
- Website: planetcomicon.com//

Planet Comicon Kansas City, formerly Planet Comicon, is an annual comic book convention taking place in Kansas City, Missouri. Originally held at the Overland Park International Trade Center in nearby Overland Park, Kansas, the venue changed in 2013 to its current home at the Kansas City Convention Center. The show is a three-day event.

== Programming ==
The convention features a wide array of activities and programming including industry guests, various discussion panels, celebrity signings and photo opportunities, and costume contests. It features a large and lively Exhibitor's Hall with comics retailers from across the country bringing a large stock of modern and vintage comics, as well as other products such as statues, art prints, toys, and action figures. RPG and tabletop gaming as well as comic book third-party grading is supported in specific areas of the convention center. Industry guests have included Stan Lee, Jim Steranko, Neal Adams, Howard Chaykin, Jim Lee, Michael Turner, and Roy Thomas. Celebrity guests have included Project Gemini, Project Mercury, and Apollo program astronauts, stars of Star Wars and Star Trek, including William Shatner, and stars of Marvel Comics and DC Comics film and television properties. The convention’s large Artists Alley includes nationally-known guests, including returning local creators such as comic book writer Jason Aaron, writer-artist Ande Parks, artists Freddie Williams II and Skottie Young, and authors Elizabeth C. Bunce, Dayton Ward, and Kevin Dilmore.

== History ==
The event began as Planet Comicon, a two-day event at the Overland Park International Trade Center in 1999. It was first organized by comics retailer Chris Jackson of Overland Park, KS, and Elite Comics owner William Binderup. Because it outgrew its original venue, it moved to its current event location at the Kansas City Convention Center in 2013, expanding to a three-day event in 2014. It added “Kansas City” to its signage and logo in 2017. In 2013 Planet Comicon hosted an episode of the Syfy Channel television series Heroes of Cosplay, thereafter making the convention a cosplay destination for professional and amateur cosplayers. Planet Comicon made national news in 2016 when guest Kevin Smith, a movie director and comic book writer, posted on social media about a flight delay, changing a flight to Southwest Airlines to not disappoint his fans. Planet Comicon celebrated its 20th anniversary event in 2019. The convention’s 2020 event was canceled because of the COVID-19 pandemic, but resumed in 2021, including an appearance by the original NASA Liberty Bell 7 space capsule.
