= Traci Brimhall =

American poet

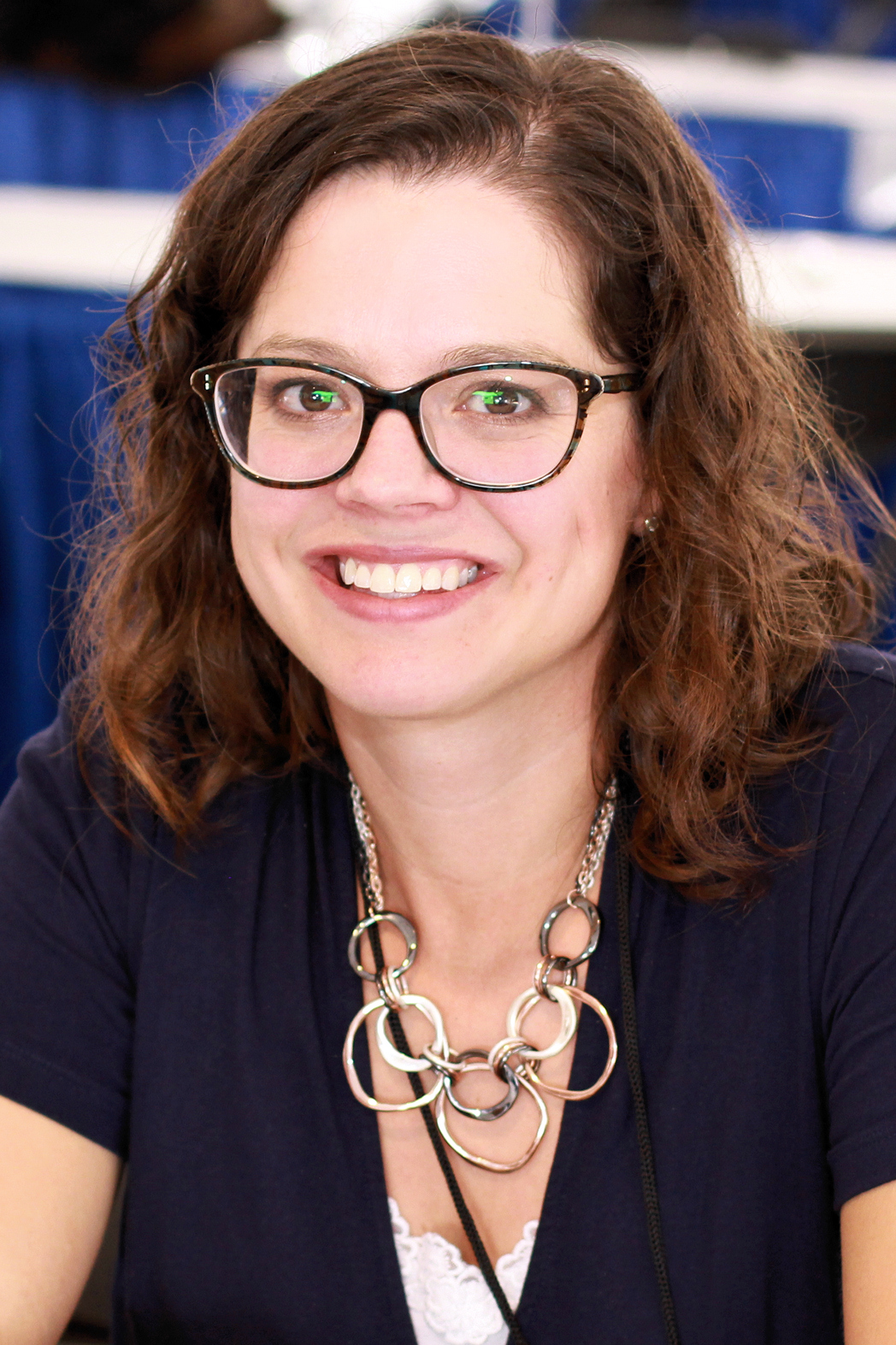
- Brimhall at the 2018 Texas Book Festival
- Born: Little Falls, Minnesota, U.S.
- Education: Florida State University; Sarah Lawrence College; Western Michigan University
- Writing career
- Genre: Poetry

Traci Brimhall is an American poet and professor. She teaches creative writing at Kansas State University. She is the poet laureate of Kansas.

== Early life and education ==
Brimhall was born in Little Falls, Minnesota in 1982. She graduated from Florida State University with a Bachelor of Arts, and completed a Master of Fine Arts at Sarah Lawrence College. She received a Ph.D. from Western Michigan University, where she was a King/Chávez/Parks Fellow.

== Career ==
Brimhall is the author of Our Lady of the Ruins (W. W. Norton & Company, 2012) and Rookery (Southern Illinois University Press, 2010). Our Lady of the Ruins won the 2011 Barnard Women Poets Prize, judged by Carolyn Forché. Rookery won the 2009 Crab Orchard Series in Poetry First Book Award, and it was a finalist for the ForeWord Book of the Year Award. Saudade, inspired by stories from her Brazilian-born mother, was published by Copper Canyon Press in 2017. Come the Slumberless to the Land of Nod was published in 2020 and Love Prodigal in 2024.

Brimhall's work has been published in The New Yorker, Poetry, New England Review, Ploughshares, Slate, The Believer, The Kenyon Review, and The New Republic. Her work has also been featured on Poetry Daily, Verse Daily, PBS NewsHour, and The Best American Poetry 2013 and 2014. She has also worked with illustrator Eryn Cruft on poetry comics that have been published in Guernica and Nashville Review. The duo published The Wrong Side of Rapture in 2013. Brimhall co-authored the chapbook Bright Power, Dark Peace with Brynn Saito (Diode Editions, 2013).

Brimhall received a 2013 National Endowment for the Arts Literature Fellowship in Poetry. She was the 2012 Summer Poet in Residence at the University of Mississippi and the 2008–2009 Jay C. and Ruth Halls Poetry Fellow at the Wisconsin Institute for Creative Writing. She has also been supported by the Sewanee Writers' Conference, The Writer's Center, Vermont Studio Center, DISQUIET International Literary Program, and The Arctic Circle. In 2022, she was named poet laureate of Kansas.

== Works ==
- Rookery. SIU Press. October 21, 2010. ISBN 978-0-8093-8579-9.
- Our Lady of the Ruins, Norton, 2012, ISBN 978-0-393-08643-0
- Saudade, Copper Canyon Press, 2017, ISBN 978-1-55659-517-2
- Come the Slumberless to the Land of Nod, Copper Canyon Press, 2020, ISBN 978-1-55659-580-6
- Love Prodigal, Copper Canyon Press, 2024, ISBN 978-1-55659-702-2
