= Elizabeth C. Bunce =

American author

- Bunce at San Diego Comic-Con in 2011
- Education: University of Iowa
- Occupation: Author
- Writing career
- Genres: mystery novels; fantasy; Children's literature; ghost stories; young adult
- Notable works: • Premeditated Myrtle; • Cold-Blooded Myrtle; • Myrtle, Means, and Opportunity; • A Curse Dark as Gold; • StarCrossed
- Notable awards: Edgar Allan Poe Award; 2021; Silver Falchion Award; 2023; William C. Morris Award; 2009
- Website: elizabethcbunce.com

Elizabeth C. Bunce is an American author who writes mysteries, fantasy, and ghost stories. Best known for her Edgar Award-winning Myrtle Hardcastle Mystery series and her novel A Curse Dark as Gold, her books feature strong female characters, are often inspired by folklore, and targeted toward young adult and pre-teen readers while also appealing to adults. Her writing style has been referred to as literary fiction, and her works have been called “mysteries in fantasy dress,” “spun with mystery and shot through with romance.” Her works are infused with the results of her research into history, science, culture, and etymology, often set in or inspired by historical places and times.

== Career ==
Bunce's first novel A Curse Dark as Gold received the American Library Association’s inaugural William C. Morris Award, and was named a Smithsonian Notable Book. The first book in Bunce’s Myrtle Hardcastle Mystery series, Premeditated Myrtle, was awarded the 2021 Edgar Award by the Mystery Writers of America, it was an honoree of the Society of Midland Authors, and it was an Agatha Award finalist and an Anthony Award finalist. In 2022 Bunce again was named a finalist for the Edgar Award, Agatha Award, and Anthony Award for the third book in her series, Cold-Blooded Myrtle, making Bunce one of only three authors with this distinction. In 2024 she became a three-time Edgar Award finalist with the nomination of the fifth book in her series, Myrtle, Means, and Opportunity. With nominations for the fourth consecutive year for the series in 2024, she became a four-time Anthony Award finalist and a four-time Agatha Award finalist. In Myrtle Peril won the Silver Falchion Award at Killer Nashville 2023 (Cold-Blooded Myrtle was a finalist for the award in 2022). Two of Bunce's novels have appeared on Oprah Winfrey's Book Club's Kids’ Reading List, and four of Bunce's novels have been awarded Kansas Notable Book Awards.

A full-time writer since earning her degree in English and anthropology from the University of Iowa in 1996, Bunce has presented workshops on writing and storytelling techniques for both professional writers and kids, appeared as a panelist for her fans at San Diego Comic-Con, Planet Comicon, Bouchercon, Malice Domestic, the World Fantasy Convention, WisCon, and other pop culture conventions, and she was Guest of Honor at Archon 45. She has appeared as a panelist or presenter at numerous libraries and schools. Bunce has referred to herself as an avid “maker”—she is also a historical costumer, cosplayer, and needlewoman. She was the keynote speaker at Kansas City's inaugural event for the 36th annual World Doll Day. Bunce is a fan of Gothic fiction, ghost stories, mystery tropes, pop culture references, The Scarlet Pimpernel, Veronica Mars, and the works of Daphne Du Maurier, Sharon Shinn, and Charles Dickens. Bunce has said that in her youth she was a voracious reader and a fan of the Trixie Belden mystery novels. Bunce is represented by Elise Howard at DeFiore & Company.

== Reception ==
Bunce has received favorable industry and literary reviews for her writing. Publishers Weekly referred to her Myrtle Hardcastle mystery series as “the best thing to happen to youth mysteries since Trixie Belden.” The Wall Street Journal said “Younger Holmes fans (and older ones too) should be charmed by Elizabeth C. Bunce's Cold-Blooded Myrtle.” The Buffalo News called Premeditated Myrtle a “hugely entertaining, well-crafted Victorian whodunnit.” The Kansas City Star called Premeditated Myrtle "loaded with energy that propels the reader forward in the tradition of all the most addictive of children’s books mysteries.” Peter S. Beagle, author of The Last Unicorn, said "Elizabeth Bunce is the real thing, no question about it. A Curse Dark as Gold beats the hell out of any fantasy novel I’ve read this year. Her heroine/narrator is immensely appealing; the atmosphere of a world on the cusp of the Industrial Revolution is completely believable; and the suspense of the story builds so craftily that I started taking notes on just how she does it. Speaking as a writer, Elizabeth Bunce is definitely worth stealing from; speaking as a reader… all right, all right, already, I couldn’t put it down. She’s that good.” Smithsonian Magazine called Bunce's A Curse Dark as Gold, “a spellbinding novel of romance and buried secrets.”

== Works ==
Bunce is known for two series, both ongoing. The first is a high fantasy for young adults featuring a thief named Digger called the Thief Errant series, including the novels StarCrossed (named a Chicago Public Library Best of the Best Book for 2010) and Liar's Moon. The series has been called a “political fantasy” and compared to the novels of George R.R. Martin.

Her Myrtle Hardcastle Mystery series features a 12-year-old aspiring detective named Myrtle Hardcastle, who solves crimes with her governess Ada Judson and a cat named Peony, set in 1890s Victorian England. Bunce's young sleuth has been compared to Trixie Belden, Enola Holmes, Flavia de Luce, and Harriet the Spy. The series is being published internationally in German via Knesebeck Verlag, in Russian via Five Quarters Publishing, in Chinese via Zhejiang Literature & Art Publishing House, and in Czech via Albatros Media A.S., and distributed in Australia via Hardie Grant Publishing and Canada via Thomas Allen & Son, Ltd.

=== Standalone Novels ===
- A Curse Dark as Gold (2008), Arthur A. Levine Books/Scholastic
- Ravish (coming 2027), Sarah Barley Books/Simon & Schuster

=== Thief Errant series ===
- StarCrossed (2010), Arthur A. Levine Books/Scholastic
- Liar’s Moon (2011), Arthur A. Levine Books/Scholastic

=== Myrtle Hardcastle Mystery series ===
- Premeditated Myrtle (2020), Algonquin Young Readers/Workman Publishing
- How to Get Away with Myrtle (2020), Algonquin Young Readers/Workman Publishing
- Cold-Blooded Myrtle (2021), Algonquin Young Readers/Workman Publishing
- In Myrtle Peril (2022), Algonquin Young Readers/Workman Publishing/Hachette Book Group
- Myrtle, Means, and Opportunity (2023), Algonquin Young Readers/Workman Publishing/Hachette Book Group
