= Leah Hampton =

Writer and poet from Appalachia

Leah Hampton (September 21, 1973) is a writer. She writes primarily about Appalachia, class, and climate change. Her debut collection, F*ckface, was named a Best Book of 2020 by Slate, Electric Literature, and PopMatters. She is currently the Environmental Humanities and Creative Writing Fellow in Residence at the University of Idaho’s Confluence Lab.

== Early life and education ==
Hampton was primarily raised in Western North Carolina. She holds dual US/UK citizenship.

She was awarded the Philip Roth Residency at the Stadler Center for Poetry in the spring of 2020

She graduated with her MFA from the Michener Center for Writers in Austin, Texas, where she won the Keene Prize for Literature. She has also won regional prizes, including the Doris Betts Fiction Prize and the James Hurst Prize for Fiction which are both for writers who are living in or are from North Carolina.

== Selected works ==
=== Books ===
- F*ckface and Other Stories, New York: Henry Holt, 2020

=== Short fiction ===
- “Meemaw F**ks A Wolf,” McSweeney’s Quarterly, Issue 61, 2020
- “Twitchell,” Electric Literature, May 2020
- “Parkway,” Ecotone, Winter 2018
- “Meat,” Electric Literature, August 2019
- “Boomer,” North Carolina Literary Review (NCLR) 26 (2018)
- “Sparkle,” Appalachian Heritage, Winter 2017
- “F*ckface,” storySouth, Spring 2016
- “Queen,” Appalachian Heritage, Summer 2014
- “The Saint,” NCLR 22 (2013)

=== Nonfiction ===
- “Absence and Elements, A Prayer” in The Hindman Flood Anthology, University of Kentucky Press, 2023
- “The Women Who Asked Me to Keep Their Abortions Secret,” Salon, September 2022
- “Rough and Tumble: The History of Appalachian Eye-Gouge Fighting.” In Great Smoky Mountains, Taylor Bruce, ed. Wildsam, 2021
- “Lost in a (Mis)Gendered Appalachia,” Guernica, November 2020
- “On Sick Trees, JD Vance, and the Invasive Species of Appalachia,” Literary Hub, August 2020
- “James Michener’s Texas Years.” Southwestern American Literature, Fall 2018
- “Above and Beyond.” In Red, White &amp; True: The American Military Story, Tracy Crow, ed. Potomac Books/U of Nebraska Press, 2014

=== Poetry ===
- “Balanced On A Bird for Afghanistan,” “Cancer, Texas,” and “Exonumia.” Still: The Journal, Winter 2017
- “Anecdote of Kimchi in Appalachia.” The Wallace Stevens Journal 37.1 (Spring 2013)

=== Reviews ===
- Review of I Had To Think Up A Way To Survive by Lynn Melnick, Georgia Review Winter 2023
- “‘Floodies’ Reinvent the Story of Hurricane Harvey (review of More City Than Water by Lacy Johnson).” Texas Monthly July 21, 2022
- “On 17776, A Not-Book by Jon Bois.” Post Road 29, Winter 2021
- “Denis Johnson’s Largesse of the Sea Maiden.” Chattahoochee Review Fall 2018/Winter 2019
- “A Vital New Book About America’s Divide.” The Los Angeles Times, September 28, 2018
- “What You Are Getting Wrong About Appalachia.” The Los Angeles Times, July 18, 2018
- “Robert Gipe’s Weedeater.” Appalachian Heritage Winter 2018
- “Literary Learning: Teaching the English Major.” International Journal for the Scholarship of Teaching and Learning 7.3 (2012)
