= Wyatt Townley =

- Born: September 20, 1954 (age 71)
- Occupations: Poet, writer, yoga instructor
- Writing career
- Period: 20th-21st Centuries
- Genres: Poetry, nonfiction, fitness/health

Wyatt Townley is an American poet, author, and yoga instructor, honored as the fourth Kansas Poet Laureate (2013–2015).

== Biography ==
Townley is a fourth-generation Kansan and she currently lives in Shawnee Mission.

== Kansas Poet Laureate ==
Through the Kansas Humanities Council, Townley is offering a series of programs, including workshops, lectures, and readings.

== Honors and awards ==
- Nelson Poetry Book Award for The Afterlives of Trees
- Kansas Notable Book for The Afterlives of Trees
- The Pushcart Prize, nominee
- To the Stars poetry contest winner, sponsored by the Kansas Arts Commission ["Centering the House" and "Inside the Snow Globe" selected from The Afterlives of Trees]

== Publications ==
- Perfectly Normal (Brooklyn, NY: The Smith), 1990. ISBN 0-9122-9287-3
- The Breathing Field: Meditations on Yoga (Boston: Little, Brown and Co.), 2002. ISBN 0-8212-2794-7
- Yoganetics: Be Fit, Healthy, and Relaxed One Breath at a Time (San Francisco: HarperSanFrancisco), 2003. ISBN 0-0605-0224-X [reprinted in 2004 by HarperCollins World]
- Kansas City Ballet: The First Fifty Years (Kansas City, MO: Rockhill Books), 2007. ISBN 1-9334-6643-X
- The Afterlives of Trees: Poems (Topeka, KS: Woodley Press), 2011. ISBN 0-9828-7522-3

== Anthologies ==
- Caryn Mirriam-Goldberg (ed.). Begin Again: 150 Kansas Poems (Topeka, KS: Woodley Press), 2011. ISBN 0-9828-7525-8

== See also ==
- List of U.S. state poets laureate
