= The University News (Moscow) =

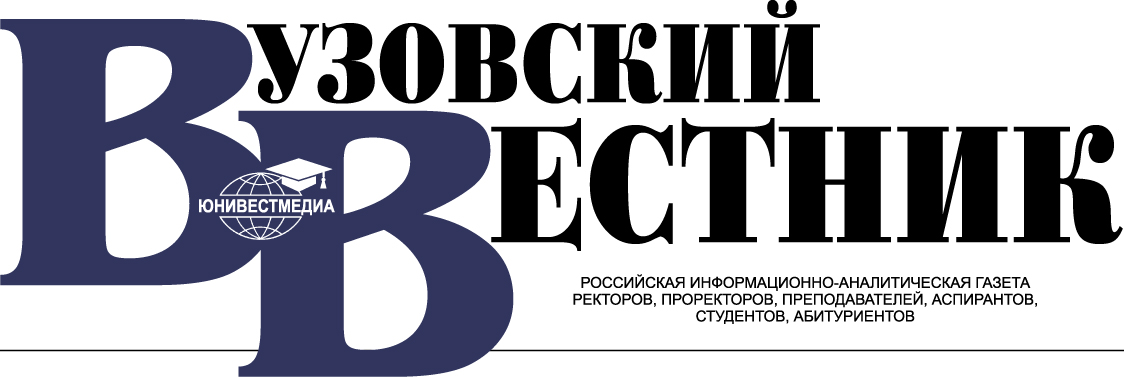
The University News logo

The University News (Russian: Вузовский Вестник) is a Russian newspaper that covers information about all universities. It has been published since 1994 on 16 broadsides two times a month. Its target audience is rectors, pro-rectors, lecturers, students and prospective university students. Twice yearly a full-color anthology "Нigher School of the 21st Century" comes out as a supplement. The founder and chef-editor of editions is Andrey Borisovich Sholokhov, an honored cultural worker of Russia, and honored figure of Russian higher education.

The newspaper cooperates with the Russian Union of Rectors and senates of rectors of Moscow, Moscow Region and other regions universities.

On these pages leaders of the country and headmasters of federal, national and regional universities give their ideas. Leaders of the country, ministers of education and science of the Russian Federation, headmaster of Russian Union of Rectors, rector of Moscow state university, rectors and principals of federal, regional and national-research universities can be seen on the newspaper's pages.
