= Sarah Smarsh =

American nonfiction writer (born 1980)

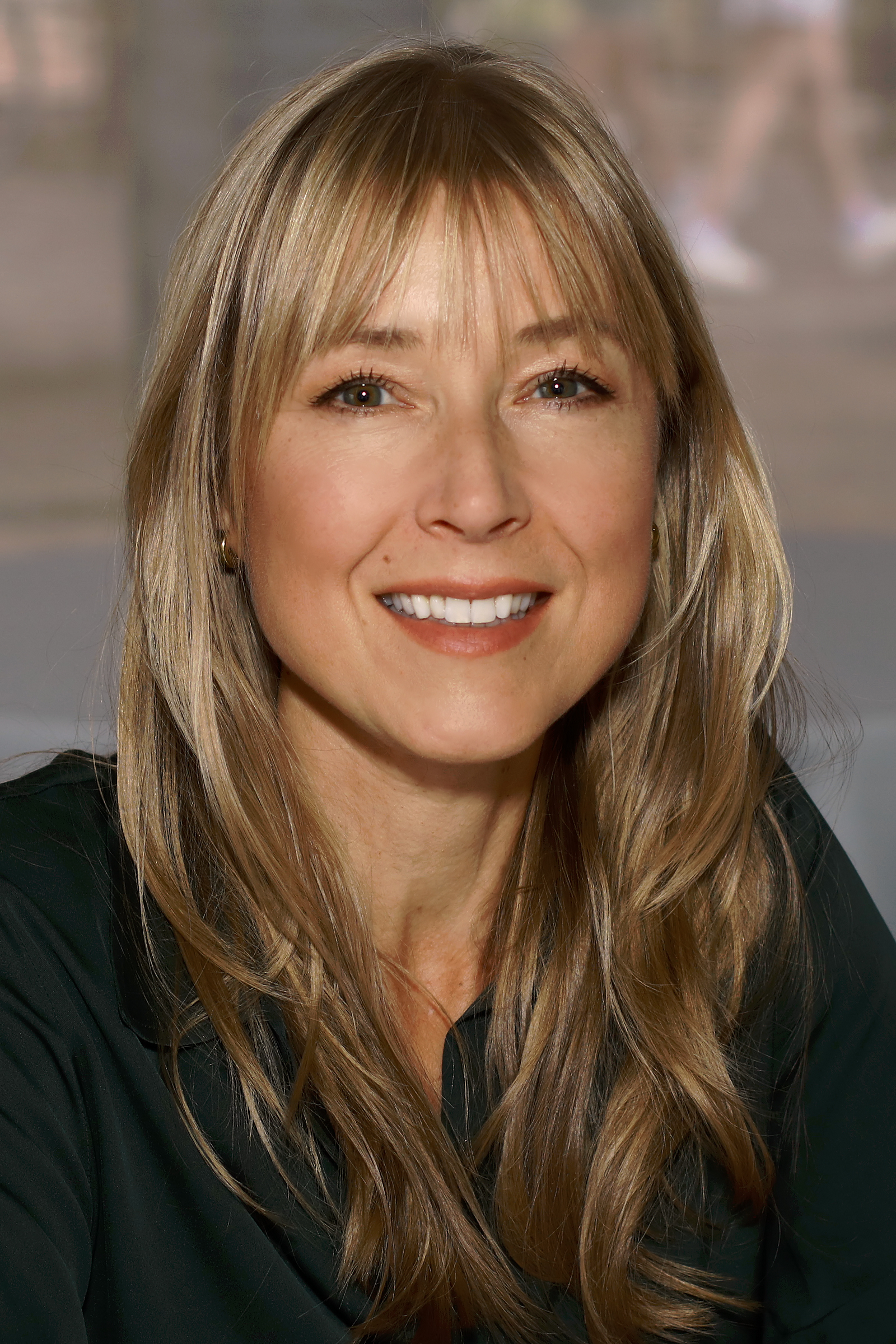
- Smarsh at the 2024 Texas Book Festival.
- Born: August 8, 1980 (age 46); Kingman, Kansas, U.S.
- Education: University of Kansas (BA); Columbia University (MFA)
- Occupation: Writer
- Writing career
- Genre: Nonfiction

Sarah Smarsh (born 8 August 1980) is an American journalist and nonfiction writer.

== Background ==
Smarsh was born in rural Kansas and grew up on farms and in small towns. Her family moved frequently, and she attended eight schools before she reached ninth grade. As a first generation college student, she attended the University of Kansas starting in 1998, and received her MFA in nonfiction writing from Columbia University.

While in fifth grade, Smarsh wrote a story about her family for a class assignment. Her teacher at the time sent the story to a national children's magazine, where it was then published. After the story was published, Smarsh told her family that she would one day publish a full book about them.

She has been a fellow at the Shorenstein Center on Media, Politics and Public Policy. She has written for publications including the Columbia Journalism Review, The New York Times, The Guardian, and The New Yorker.

== Published works ==
Published in 2018, Heartland is an autobiographical work which focuses on the lives of her family members, white blue-collar people rooted in Kansas and the Great Plains; the book was a finalist for the National Book Award and the Kirkus Prize, a recipient of the Kansas Notable Book Award and of the Chicago Tribune Heartland Prize in 2019. She Come By It Natural (2020) is a collection of essays about Dolly Parton, provoked by stereotyped coverage of rural people in the context of the 2016 election. The book was a finalist for the nonfiction category of the National Books Critics Circle Award.

Published in 2024, Bone of the Bone is a collection of essays written by Smarsh between 2013 and 2024. Drawing on her background growing up on a Kansas wheat farm and her work as a journalist, the book addresses recurring themes in her career, including class stratification, political polarization, gender and labor, environmental precarity, media representation, and tensions between rural and urban life. The volume brings together more than thirty previously published pieces, combining personal reflection with cultural and political analysis, and situates Smarsh's long-standing focus on socioeconomic inequality within contemporary debates in the United States.

== Other works ==
In 2019, Smarsh started the podcast The Homecomers. The podcast spotlights and interviews people from rural and working class communities, similar to the ones that Smarsh herself grew up in, in order to dispel stereotypes about themselves and the places where they live.
