= Kansas Sampler =

American foundation

Kansas Sampler Foundation
- Formation: 1993
- Type: Nonprofit organization
- Headquarters: Inman, KS, United States
- Executive Director: Marci Penner
- Revenue: $133,176 (2015)
- Expenses: $151,142 (2015)
- Website: www.kansassampler.org

The Kansas Sampler Foundation is a public non-profit 501(c) organization. The Foundation is located at the Kansas Sampler Center near Inman, Kansas. According to the organization's web site and publications, the mission is to preserve and sustain rural culture by educating Kansans about Kansas by networking and encouraging the support of rural communities. The support is generally in the form of encouraging awareness of, and commerce with, rural businesses. Methods include positive messages of motivation encouraging people to celebrate the sunflower state. Founded in 1993 by Mil and Marci Penner, the Kansas Sampler Foundation is based at the Penner family farm.

The Foundation stresses keeping rural Kansas vigorous. Accentuating rural culture elements like architecture, art, commerce, cuisine, customs, geography, history, and people — the goal is to get more Kansans to realize (and visit) the treasures in their state. Any one of these elements puts a person, place or thing on the list of places to see. They are reasons to celebrate towns. There is also a checklist to help communities catalog what they have to offer. Small rural towns are seen as critical to the continued character of Kansas.

== Kansas Sampler Festival ==
Supporters sample rural Kansas culture elements by attending the Kansas Sampler Festival. It takes place annually, roving to different Kansas communities every two years. About eight thousand people attended the 2006 festival in Garden City, Kansas. Approximately four hundred volunteers worked together to help put it on. It returned to the Lee Richardson Zoo in the spring of 2007. It has taken place in Inman, Kansas, Pratt, Kansas, Independence, Kansas and Ottawa, Kansas and in Concordia, Kansas, in the years since.

Much of the work of the Foundation matches the grass-roots, forward-thinking example of businesses and attractions featured at the Kansas Sampler Festival. The currency of awareness is spread in newsletters, and attitudes among member-supporters are tilted towards accentuating positive, mutual success and common survival — indeed a core value of the Foundation. There are group outings, and campaigns by members to trek across Kansas, finding out-of-the-way attractions, people and stories.

There several areas of interest under the umbrella of the foundation, and many ways to participate. Principal among them is the Kansas Explorers Club. Foundation director Marci Penner said, "The club helps people know what there is to see and do in the nooks and crannies of the state." The Foundation's goal is to get 5,000 Kansas Explorer Club members."

== Kansas Explorer's Club ==
The Kansas Explorers Club is a group of people bound by the common interest of exploring Kansas.

The Explorers Club newsletter comes out six times a year. In the pages, there are examples of places where the membership might go to explore, to find locally owned businesses, and to experience lesser-known aspects of the state. Suggested day-trips often lead the Explorer on a themed trip, such as visiting surviving examples of the Old West in Kansas, a western-themed local eatery, and a bed and breakfast that dates back to frontier days.

One of the guiding principals is that Explorers 'dare to do dirt' - that is, they will seek out elusive best-kept secrets, and don't mind coming home tired, sunburned and with muddy boots for the experience. The stories, cautions, and recommendations from the trips appear in the newsletter. One motto is "It's About the Journey" which speaks to exploring.

Celebrated explorers have taken it upon themselves to venture across Kansas for a certain purpose; Explorers might wish to eat lunch in as many towns as possible, or try to drink a beer in every Kansas county. The list of such Explorer accomplishments grew significantly after one explorer in particular gathered nationwide media attention for his crusade.

There is a secret, ritual greeting among members, and there is an annual 'Happening', specifically for the purpose of lots of Explorers trekking to one spot en masse.

The Kansas Explorers Club was founded in 1994. The club also plans Group Adventures to places not normally accessible to the public and once a year they have a Grand Expedition. The Grand Expedition is a bus tour designed to help the public see common sights of Kansas with new eyes. Individual membership to the club is $18.61 (the year Kansas became a state). Members receive a membership card, the regular newsletters and information about trips, but they also learn the secret explorer greeting ritual.

== We Kan! ==
The We Kan! section of the Sampler Foundation's on-line information calls the We Kan! network and newsletter "a support group and information flow among rural communities to help develop the unique identity of each town and to attract visitors in a way that will help keep towns alive and thriving." Furthermore, it states "It is a group of community leaders, volunteers, and supporters striving to make their communities better. Whatever the focus, We Kan! members enjoy the camaraderie of each other, the sharing of ideas, and a one-for-all, all-for-one attitude." according to the Sampler Foundation website . We Kan! awards are presented to distinguished Explorers annually.

The We Kan! newsletter is published to motivate, and to educate about strategies to help sustain rural Kansas culture. Articles outline the importance of spending in favor of small businesses, in order to keep them alive. The pages often bring tactics for making a difference, however small, in the life of a small town, and explains in some depth how and why rural commerce struggles to survive. There are also pointers as to changes in businesses around the state, and simple inexpensive steps for the individual to take to make a difference. An example is buying postage stamps at smaller post offices, so small towns can keep their U.S. Post Office open, and take a step back from the brink of disappearing.

=== Lizard Lips ===
In the tiny Woodson County town of Toronto, Kansas - population less than 300 in 2003, there is Lizard Lips Grill and Deli. "The Kansas Guidebook for Explorers" http://kansasguidebook.com/ says the "combination deli, convenience store, and bait shop" is a good source for area information. But is also a part of We Kan! lore. Lizard Lips is an example of a small, private business - vital to a community and on the cusp of bankruptcy, until We Kan! came along. They were challenged to go to the store and spend five dollars to keep it vital. The plan worked. The business stands out as a practical example of grass roots success in rural cultural commerce.

== Marci Penner ==
Marci Penner founded the Kansas Sampler Foundation with her father, Mil Penner in 1993. The two had seen much of what the state of Kansas had to offer in their travels co-authoring a series of guidebooks, and found themselves championing small town survival not long after. She is the editor and publisher of the foundations newsletters, and her most recent book —"The Kansas Guidebook for Explorers" http://kansasguidebook.com/ — came out in 2005. Marci Penner serves on the state government Rural Kansas Task Force, and is the recipient of the Kansan of the Year award. Penner organized the first Valley Falls Retreat to promote the western heritage of rural Kansas.
