= The University News (University of Missouri–Kansas City) =

Student newspaper

The University News, or U-News, is an independent student newspaper at the University of Missouri–Kansas City. It publishes weekly, during the school semester, and averages sixteen issues per semester, with an additional issue during the summer.
