= State Library of Kansas =

State agency in Kansas, United States

- Current logo (2022)

Agency overview
- Formed: 1855
- Preceding agency: Kansas Territorial Library
- Jurisdiction: State of Kansas
- Headquarters: 300 SW 10th Avenue; Topeka, Kansas; 39°02′53″N 95°40′41″W
- Agency executive: Ray Walling, State Librarian
- Website: State Library of Kansas Website

The State Library of Kansas is a department within the state government of Kansas, with locations in Topeka and Emporia. Ray Walling was appointed acting State Librarian in June 2022. On January 19, 2023, Walling was confirmed by the Kansas Senate as the 18th Kansas State Librarian.

== Locations ==
The research collections and most of the staff of the State Library of Kansas have been located on the third floor of the Kansas State Capitol at 10th and Jackson Streets in downtown Topeka, Kansas, since 1900. In December, 2009, the staff was moved out of its third floor location in the State Capitol and into mobile units on the Capitol grounds during renovation of the north wing of the Capitol. The Library's collections were moved to an Annex in Topeka in April, 2010. Library staff and collections were returned to the third floor of the Capitol in December, 2012. The Library's Talking Books Library is located in the lower level of the Student Union, Emporia State University, Emporia, Kansas.

== Kansas Center for the Book ==
The Kansas Center for the Book is a state affiliate of the Center for the Book in the Library of Congress. The Kansas Center for the Book affiliated with the national Center for the Book in 1987 and was hosted and headquartered at the Topeka & Shawnee County Public Library from then until 2005, when it moved to the State Library of Kansas. Programs at the Kansas Center for the Book are: the Kansas Notable Book Awards, Kansas Reads to Preschoolers, and the Parade of States at the National Book Festival.

== Kansas Talking Books ==
The Kansas Talking Book Service, headquartered in Emporia, Kansas, provides books, newspapers and magazines in braille and recorded format with playback equipment to any Kansas citizen unable to use standard print because of visual or physical impairment. The program is coordinated through the National Library Service for the Blind and Physically Handicapped, Library of Congress. The Talking Books service also hosts a book club and publishes a regular blog discussing what books are available or popular with the service. In 2022, the program partnered with the Ohio Library for the Blind to expand its collections through the use of the Braille and Audio Reading Download (BARD) service and mobile app.

The Service heads a network of Kansas Talking Book subregional libraries located in Great Bend, Manhattan, Norton, Wichita and Topeka, Kansas.

== Online Services ==
The Library's online services are available to Kansas residents. Downloadable audio and ebooks are available online through a browser or various apps. The Library provides a Kansas Library eCard, which allows access to these databases:

- A list of databases available can be viewed on the State Library's website at library.ks.gov/databases
- Kansas Library eCards are available to Kansas residents and are issued by local public libraries in the state or by visiting the physical location of the State Library, located inside the state capitol building
- Ebooks and audiobooks through various apps and services, including CloudLibrary, ComicsPlus, and Freading.
- Online resources for financial and health literacy, automotive repair, career services, research and language learning programs, among many others.

== Reference Division ==
The Research and Information Division serves the research and reference needs of state government and the general public. The division, located in Topeka, has a collection of over 250,000 titles including books, magazines, current newspapers, U.S. federal documents, Kansas government documents, Kansas legislative material and a newspaper clippings file dating back to the 1920s. Research assistance is provided for walk-in, telephone, instant message and email questions. Interlibrary loan service is also available, providing material within the library's collection to people around the world.

The Reference division also offers a Legislative hotline, which has been in operation since 1975. Librarians with the reference division assist Kansans with basic questions about the legislature, including providing bill numbers, status, dates and calendar information. Constituents may also obtain contact information and leave messages for their representatives via this service. Hotline staff are unable to transfer calls to office staff or other numbers. The hotline can be reached at 1-800-432-3924.

== See also ==
- List of libraries in the United States
