= Jonathan Holden =

American poet (1941–2024)

Jonathan Holden (July 18, 1941 – December 20, 2024) was an American poet. He was the first Poet Laureate of Kansas and a Professor of English at Kansas State University, Manhattan, Kansas. Chosen in 2004, his two-year term began July 1, 2005. He was succeeded by Denise Low on July 1, 2007.

== Biography ==
Holden was born in Morristown, New Jersey on July 18, 1941. He received a Bachelor of Arts in English from Oberlin College in 1963. From 1963 to 1965, he was an editorial assistant for Cambridge Book Company in Bronxville, New Jersey. He then taught math at a high school in West Orange, New Jersey until 1968. In 1970, he received a Master of Arts in creative writing from San Francisco State College. He received a PhD in English from the University of Colorado Boulder in 1974.

From 1974 to 1978, he was "poet in residence" at Stephens College in Columbia, Missouri. He moved to Manhattan, Kansas in 1978, where he joined Kansas State University. There he became "poet in residence" and University Distinguished Professor of English. In 1991, he became Thursten P. Morton Professor at the University of Louisville. In 2000, he served on the Pulitzer Prize poetry selection committee. In 2004, the governor appointed him poet laureate, with his term beginning the following July 1, 2005.

Holden died in Manhattan on December 20, 2024, at the age of 83.

== As poet Laureate ==
During his tenure as Kansas Poet Laureate, Holden instigated a statewide video teleconf program titled SHOPTALK, in conjunction with Kansas State University’s TELENET 2 program. SHOPTALK provided insight to poetry and poetry writing; the program provided a platform for Mr. Holden to have interactive poetry discussions with a live audience. Several notable Kansas poets appeared as guests on the program.

As Poet Laureate, Holden was also active as an advisor for "kansaspoets.com", a website specifically dedicated to Kansas poets and poetry. As well, Holden was guest editor for The Midwest Quarterly. The particular issue cited features over 60 Kansas poets plus special recognition to both Jonathan Holden and Denise Low. The issue received a very positive review from Literary Magazine Review (V. 25 Nos. 3 & 4 Fall & Winter), Jennifer Brantley, editor.

== Publications and awards ==
Holden published 18 books, all monographs, in addition to more than 190 poems published in professional journals.

=== Publications ===
- Design for a House: Poems, University of Missouri Press, 1972
- The Mark to Turn: A Reading of William Stafford's Poetry, University Press of Kansas, 1976.
- The Rhetoric of the Contemporary Lyric, Indiana University Press, 1980.
- Leverage, University Press of Virginia, 1983
- Falling from Stardom, Carnegie-Mellon University Press, 1984.
- The Names of the Rapids, University of Massachusetts Press, 1985.
- Style and Authenticity of Postmodern Poetry, University of Missouri Press, 1986.
- Landscapes of the Self: The Development of Richard Hugo's Poetry, Associated Faculty Press, 1986.
- Against Paradise, University of Utah Press, 1990.
- The Fate of American Poetry, University of Georgia Press, 1991
- American Gothic: Poems, University of Georgia Press, 1992.
- Brilliant Kids, University of Utah Press, 1992.
- The Sublime: Poems, University of North Texas Press, 1995.
- Guns and Boyhood in America, University of Michigan Press, 1997.
- The Old Formalism: Character in Contemporary American Poetry, University of Arkansas Press, 1999.
- Knowing: New and Selected Poems, University of Arkansas Press, 2000.
- Mama's Boys: A Double Life, Lewis-Clark Press, 2007

=== Awards ===
- 1972: Devins Award for Poetry
- 1974: National Endowment for the Humanities grant
- 1975: Borestone Mountain Poetry Awards
- 1978: Aspen Foundation for the Arts Prize
- 1979: Kansas Quarterly first award
- 1982: Associated Writing Programs award series in poetry
- 1984, 1985: National Endowment for the Arts creative writing fellowship
- 1985: Juniper Prize
- 1986: Distinguished Faculty Award
- 1995: Vassar Miller Prize

== Sources ==
- www.jonathanholden.com
- www.kansaspoets.com
- Biles, Jan . "Passion for poetry drives incoming poet laureate." The Capital-Journal. May 26, 2007. Online. May 2, 2008.
- Contemporary Authors Online, Gale, 2008. Reproduced in Biography Resource Center. Farmington Hills, Mich.: Gale, 2008. Document Number: H1000046450. Online. May 2, 2008.
- Eberhart, John Mark."State lines: Rhyme on one side, no reason on the other." Kansas City Star. 2004-12-26. Page 7. Online. May 2, 2008.
- K-State media guide -- Jonathan Holden bio. Online. May 2, 2008.]
