= Caryn Mirriam-Goldberg =

American writer

- Born: New York City, United States
- Occupations: Poet; writer; professor
- Writing career
- Period: 20th–21st centuries
- Genres: Poetry, fiction, non-fiction
- Subjects: physical/mental illness, poetry therapy, spirituality, yoga

Caryn Mirriam-Goldberg is an American poet, writer and professor, honored as the third Kansas Poet Laureate (2009–2012). A professor at Goddard College, a private, liberal arts college in Plainfield, Vermont, she serves as the coordinator for the Transformative Language Arts track, which she initiated. Enriching people across the United States, Mirriam-Goldberg uses workshops, retreats, and readings to broaden different communities' ideals about spoken, written, and sung word.

== Biography ==
Mirriam-Goldberg was born in New York City. She received her bachelor's degree in history from the University of Missouri, and later a M.A. and Ph.D. from the University of Kansas, where she focused on poetry, women's studies, and mythology. Mirriam-Goldberg’s beliefs are apparent through the service she has done as Kansas Poet Laureate. Currently, she lives south of Lawrence, Kansas with her husband Ken Lassman, a regional writer, and their three children.

== Kansas Poet Laureate ==
Through the Kansas Arts Commission, Mirriam-Goldberg is offering a series of programs, including workshops, lectures, and readings. Additionally, she helped organize "Poet Laureati: A National Convergence of Poets Laureate" which was held in March 2011 at the Spencer Museum of Art on the University of Kansas campus. The program included Ted Kooser (former U.S. Poet Laureate), Jonathan Holden (first Kansas Poet Laureate), herself, and 17 other states' poets laureate. She also facilitates writing workshops for people of many backgrounds. Her workshops are for people living with cancer and other serious illness, for low-income women, and for adults in transition. A certified poetry therapist, Mirriam-Goldberg serves on the executive board of the National Association for Poetry Therapy, and on the steering committee of the Transformative Language Arts Network.

== Educator ==
As a professor at Goddard College, Mirriam-Goldberg has participated in initiatives to further the understanding of using language and arts to transform theater arts, storytelling, drama, etc., to one's community encouragement and community-building. She is very involved in being a facilitator where people are involved in writing workshops. Mirriam-Goldberg is much like other female poets who speak about womanhood and experiences in life that have reflected her hardships with having cancer.

== Honors and awards ==
- City of Lawrence Phoenix Award
- Kansas Arts Fellowship in Poetry
- Rocky Mountain National Park artist-in-residency

== Publications ==
Mirriam-Goldberg has published 18 books, over 50 poems and prose, all monographs, in addition to more than 190 poems published in professional journals.

- Animals in the House: Poems (Topeka, KS: Woodley Memorial Press), 2004. ISBN 0-939391-35-X
- Circle of Women Circle of Words: A Project of the Lawrence-Douglas County Housing Authority Resident Services Office (Lawrence, KS: Mammoth Press), 2006. ISBN 0-9761773-1-5 [a work of poetry by low-income women edited by Mirriam-Goldberg]
- Landed: New Poetry (Lawrence, KS: Mammoth Publications), 2009. ISBN 0-9800102-3-3 [a CD of her reading her poetry as well as songs co-written with Kelley Hunt and performed by Hunt]
- Lot's Wife (Topeka, KS: Woodley Press), 2000. ISBN 0-939391-27-9 [poetry]
- Reading the Body (Lawrence, KS: Mammoth Press), 2004. [poetry]
- Sandra Cisneros: Latina Writer and Activist (Springfield, NJ: Enslow), 1998. ISBN 0-7660-1045-7 [biography for a juvenile audience]
- The Sky Begins at Your Feet: A Memoir on Cancer, Community, and Coming Home to the Body (North Liberty, IA: Ice Cube Press), 1999. ISBN 1-8881-6043-8 [memoir documenting her struggle with breast cancer, community, and ecology; reprinted in 2009]
- The Divorce Girl: A Story of Art and Soul (North Liberty, IA: Ice Cube Press), 2012. ISBN 1-8881-6066-7 [novel]

== Collaborative works ==
- The Power of Words: A Transformative Language Arts Reader, Social and Personal Transformation Through the Spoken, Written and Sung Word (Keene, NH: Transformative Language Arts Press), 2007. ISBN 0-9761773-5-8 [with Janet Tallman]
- To the Stars: Kansas Poets of the Ad Astra Poetry Project (Lawrence, KS: Mammoth Publications), 2009. ISBN 0-9800102-7-6 [edited by Denise Low; Mirriam-Goldberg provided "Ad Astra Poetry Writing Guide: Prompts by Caryn Mirriam-Goldberg"]
- Write Where You Are: How to Use Writing to Make Sense of Your Life, a Guide for Teens (Minneapolis, MN: Free Spirit Pub.), 1999. ISBN 1-57542-060-0 [with Elizabeth Verdick & Darsi Dreyer]

== See also ==
- List of U.S. state poets laureate
